= List of Japanese Navy ships and war vessels in World War II =

This list of Japanese Naval ships and war vessels in World War II is a list of seafaring vessels of the Imperial Japanese Navy in World War II. It includes submarines, battleships, oilers, minelayers and other types of Japanese sea vessels of war and naval ships used during wartime. It also includes the various ships of the Imperial Japanese Army.

== Aircraft carriers ==
=== Heavy/Fleet carriers ===
Fleet Carrier (11)
| Class | Picture | Type | Ships (Years in Service) | Displacement | Note |
|---|---|---|---|---|---|
| Akagi-class | | Fleet carrier | Akagi (1927–1942) | 36,500 tonnes | Converted from an Amagi-class battlecruiser. Sunk at Midway on June 5, 1942 |
| Kaga-class | Kaga after Modernization | Aircraft carrier | Kaga (1928–1942) | 38,200 tonnes | Converted from a Tosa-class battleship. Sunk at Midway on June 4, 1942 |
| Sōryū-class | IJN Sōryū | Aircraft carrier | Sōryū (1937–1942); Hiryū (1939–1942) | 16,200 tonnes | Hiryū is often considered to be a separated class. Sunk at Midway on June 5, 1942, Soryu took part in the attack on Pearl Harbor, the Battle of Wake Island, and supported the conquest of the Dutch East Indies. She was sunk at Midway on June 4, 1942 |
| Shōkaku-class | Shōkaku | Aircraft carrier | Shōkaku (1941–1944); Zuikaku (1941–1944) | 25,675 tonnes | With the exception of the Battle of Midway, Shōkaku and Zuikaku participated in every major naval action of the Pacific War, including the attack on Pearl Harbor, the Indian Ocean Raid, the Battle of the Coral Sea, and the Guadalcanal Campaign. Both carriers were sunk during the 1944 Pacific campaigns. |
| Unryū-class | Unryū on 16 July 1944 | Aircraft carrier | Unryū (1944–1944); Amagi (1944–1945); Katsuragi (1944–1945) | 17,480 tonnes | The design for these ships was based on the aircraft carrier Hiryū. IJN Planned to build 16 ships, however only 3 were completed and 2 almost completed (one of which was sunk as a target then salvaged and later scrapped) before the project was abandoned in favour of Shinano's construction. Unryū was sunk by the USS Redfish, Amagi capsized after air attacks and Katsuragi was the only heavy carrier to survive the war |
| Taihō-class | Aircraft Carrier Taihō | Aircraft carrier | Taihō (1944–1944) | 30,250 tonnes | A bit of a break from traditional Japanese carrier design, Taiho was a heavily armoured carrier expected to withstand multiple bombs and torpedo strikes. However, design faults and poor damage control allowed it to be sunk with one torpedo from the USS Albacore on June 19, 1944 |
| Shinano-class | Aircraft Carrier Shinano | Aircraft carrier | Shinano (1944–1944) | 65,800 tonnes | Initially laid down as the third of the Yamato-class battleships, Shinano was converted into an aircraft carrier due to the Japanese defeat at Midway. She was sunk on November 29, 1944, by torpedoes from USS Archerfish. |

=== Light carriers ===
Light Aircraft Carrier (9)
| Class | Picture | Type | Ships | Displacement | Note |
|---|---|---|---|---|---|
| Hōshō-class | Hōshō on 1922 | Light aircraft carrier | Hōshō (1922–1945) | 7,470 tonnes | First purpose-built carrier in the world. Scrapped 1946. |
| Ryūjō-class | Ryūjō on 1934 | Light aircraft carrier | Ryūjō (1931–1942) | 8,000 tonnes | Sunk 1942. |
| Hiyō-class | Jun'yō on 1945 | Light aircraft carrier | Hiyō (1942–1944); Jun'yō (1942–1946) | 24,150 tonnes | Converted from an ocean liner in 1939. Hiyō sunk and Jun'yō scrapped 1946–1947. |
| Zuihō-class | Zuihō on 1940 | Light aircraft carrier | Zuihō (1940–1944); Shōhō (1939–1942) | 11,443 tonnes | Both sunk during WWII. |
| Chitose-class | Chitose | Light aircraft carrier | Chitose (1938/1944–1944); Chiyoda (1938/1944–1944) | 11,200 tonnes | Both ships were seaplane tenders before their conversion in 1943. Both ships sunk in 1944. |
| Ryūhō-class | Ryūhō on 1942 | Light aircraft carrier | Ryūhō (1934/1942–1945) | 16,700 tonnes | Converted from the submarine tender Taigei 1941–1942. Recommissioned as Ryūhō 1942. Scrapped 1946. |

=== Escort carriers ===
Escort Carrier (10)
| Class | Picture | Type | Ships | Displacement | Note |
|---|---|---|---|---|---|
| Taiyō-class | Taiyo | Escort carrier | Taiyō (1941–44); Chūyō (1942–43); Un'yō (1942–44) | 17,830 tonnes | All sunk. |
| Kaiyō-class | Kaiyo | Escort carrier | Kaiyō (1943–1945) | 13,600 tonnes. Converted from ocean liner Argentina Maru. | Scrapped 1946. |
| Shin'yō-class | | Escort carrier | Shin'yō (1943–1944) | 17,500 tonnes | Converted from the German liner SS Scharnhorst 1942. Sunk 1944 by USS Spadefish. |
| Special 1TL Type | | Escort carrier | Shimane Maru (1945–1945) | 11,989 tonnes | |
| Special 2TL Type | | Escort carrier | Yamashio Maru (1945–1945) | 16,119 tonnes | Operated by the Imperial Japanese Army. |
| Type C landing craft carrier | | Landing craft carrier | Akitsu Maru (1942–1944) | 11,800 tonnes | Operated by the Imperial Japanese Army. Landing craft carrier with a flight deck |
| M Type C landing craft carrier | | Landing craft carrier | Kumano Maru (1945–1945) | 8,258 tonnes | Operated by Imperial Japanese Army. Landing craft carrier with a flight deck |

=== Seaplane tenders ===
Seaplane Tender (9)
| Class | Picture | Type | Ships | Displacement | Note |
|---|---|---|---|---|---|
| Nisshin-class | Nisshin in speed testing, 1942 | Seaplane tender | Nisshin (1942–1943) | 11,499 tonnes | Also midget submarine carrier and minelayer |
| Kamikawa Maru-class | Kamikawa Maru | Seaplane tender | Kamikawa Maru (1937–1943); Kiyokawa Maru (1941–1946); Kimikawa Maru (1937–1944); Kunikawa Maru (1937–1945) | 6,862 tonnes | Hirokawa Maru of the same class was converted to auxiliary (anti-aircraft) cruiser instead of seaplane tender when impressed for Navy service |
| Akitsushima-class | Akitsushima in 1942 | Seaplane tender | Akitsushima (1942–1944) | 4,725 tonnes | |
| Kamoi-class | Kamoi in 1937 | Seaplane tender | Kamoi (1922–1947) | 17,273 tonnes | |
| Notoro-class | Notoro in 1943 | Seaplane tender | Notoro (1934–1947) | 15,647 tonnes | Of 7 oilers in class, Notoro was converted to seaplane tender and Shiretoko to munition ship |
| Mizuho-class | Mizuho in 1940 off Tateyama | Seaplane tender | Mizuho (1939–1942) | 10,930 tonnes | Also midget submarine carrier |

== Armoured vessels ==
=== Battlecruisers ===
Fast Battleship (4) – former battlecruisers
| Class | Picture | Type | Ships in class | Displacement | Main battery | Note |
|---|---|---|---|---|---|---|
| Kongō-class | Haruna in 1934, following her second reconstruction | Fast battleship | Kongō (1913–1944); Hiei (1914–1942); Kirishima (1915–1942); Haruna (1915–1945) | 32,156 tonnes | 8 × 14-inch | Laid down and commissioned as Battlecruisers in early 20th century, remodelled into Battleships because of Washington Naval Treaty in the late 20' and into Fast Battleships in 1935, allowing them to accompany growing carrier force. All four were sunk during the war |

=== Battleships ===
Battleship (8)
| Class | Picture | Type | Ships | Displacement | Note |
|---|---|---|---|---|---|
| Fusō-class | Fusō undergoing post-reconstruction trials. | Battleship | Fusō (1915–1944); Yamashiro (1917–1944) | 29,330 tonnes | There was a plan to convert these ships into Aviation Battleships in 1943. The plan was cancelled and the two Ise-class battleships were converted instead. |
| Ise-class | Hyūga during sea trials in 1943 | Battleship | Ise (1917–1945); Hyūga (1918–1945) | 27,384 tonnes | Converted into Aviation Battleship in 1943. |
| Nagato-class | Nagato lies at anchor in Brunei Bay, 21 October 1944, shortly before the Battle of Leyte Gulf | Battleship | Nagato (1920–1945); Mutsu (1921–1943) | 32,720 tonnes | Both ships underwent significant modernization on 1934–1936, rebuilding the superstructure into the more familiar pagoda mast style. |
| Yamato-class | Yamato on Trials | Battleship | Yamato (1941–1945); Musashi (1942–1944) | 69,988 tonnes | 5 planned, 1 converted into an Aircraft carrier, 2 cancelled. Yamato was sunk during a one-way trip to Okinawa during operation Ten-Go. She never saw action there and was sunk by aircraft on the way. |

=== Heavy cruisers ===
Heavy Cruiser (18)
| Class | Picture | Type | Ships | Displacement | Note |
|---|---|---|---|---|---|
| Furutaka-class | | Heavy cruiser | Furutaka (1926–1942); Kako (1926–1942) | 7,100 tonnes | |
| Aoba-class | | Heavy cruiser | Aoba (1927–1945); Kinugasa (1927–1942) | 7,100 tonnes | Variation of the Furutaka class |
| Myōkō-class | | Heavy cruiser | Myōkō (1929–1945); Nachi (1928–1944); Haguro (1929–1945); Ashigara (1929–1945) | 11,633 tonnes | |
| Takao-class | | Heavy cruiser | Takao; Atago; Maya; Chōkai | 11,633 tonnes | Variation of the Myōkō class |
| Mogami-class | | Heavy cruiser | Mogami; Mikuma; Suzuya; Kumano | 8,500 tonnes | Suzuya and Kumano were considered to be a sub-class. Mogami was considered to be an Aviation Cruiser by the IJN (1943). |
| Tone-class | | Heavy cruiser | Tone; Chikuma | 11,213 tonnes | Considered as Aviation Cruisers by IJN |

=== Light cruisers ===
Light Cruiser (26)
| Class | Picture | Type | Ships | Displacement | Note |
|---|---|---|---|---|---|
| Tenryū-class | | Light cruiser | Tenryū; Tatsuta | 3,948 tonnes | |
| Kuma-class | | Light cruiser | Kuma; Tama; Kitakami; Ōi; Kiso | 5,500 tonnes | Kitakami and Ōi later converted to a torpedo cruiser under a short-lived Imperial Japanese Navy program. Kiso was also planned to be converted but no modifications took place. |
| Nagara-class | | Light cruiser | Nagara; Isuzu; Yura; Natori; Kinu; Abukuma | 5,570 tonnes | |
| Yūbari-class | | Light cruiser | Yūbari | 2,890 tonnes | An experimental light cruiser. |
| Sendai-class | | Light cruiser | Sendai; Jintsu; Naka | 5,195 tonnes | 8 planned; 5 cancelled. |
| Katori-class | | Light cruiser | Katori; Kashima; Kashii | 5,890 tonnes | 4 planned; 1 cancelled. Originally served as a training ship. |
| Agano-class | | Light cruiser | Agano; Noshiro; Yahagi; Sakawa | 6,652 tonnes | |
| Ōyodo-class | | Light cruiser | Ōyodo | 8,164 tonnes | 2 planned; 1 cancelled. |
| Yasoshima-class | | Light cruiser | Yasoshima; Ioshima | 2,448 tonnes | Served under the Republic of China Navy under the name of Ping Hai, until seized and re-floated in 1938 by IJN, having been sunk the year before. Later reporposed as Kaibōkans |

== Destroyers ==
=== Destroyers ===
Destroyer (169)
| Class | Picture | Type | Ships | Displacement | Note |
|---|---|---|---|---|---|
| Momi-class | | Destroyer | Momi | Kaya | Nashi | Take | Kaki | Tsuga | Nire | Kuri | Kiku | Aoi | Hagi | Fuji | Susuki | Hishi | Hasu | Warabi | Tade | Sumire | Tsuta | Ashi | Yomogi | 850 tonnes | 28 vessel planned 21 completed. 7 re-ordered as the new Wakatake-class. Relegated to mostly secondary roles. |
| Minekaze-class | | Destroyer | Minekaze | Sawakaze | Okikaze | Shimakaze | Nadakaze | Yakaze | Hakaze | Shiokaze | Akikaze | Yūkaze | Tachikaze | Hokaze | Nokaze | Namikaze | Numakaze | 1,345 tonnes | |
| Wakatake-class | | Destroyer | Wakatake | Kuretake | Sanae | Sawarabi | Asagao | Yūgao | Fuyō | Karukaya | 900 tonnes | 23 vessel planned 8 completed. Relegated to mostly secondary roles. |
| Kamikaze-class | | Destroyer | Kamikaze | Asakaze | Harukaze | Matsukaze | Hatakaze | Oite | Hayate | Asanagi | Yūnagi | 1,400 tonnes | |
| Mutsuki-class | | Destroyer | Mutsuki; Kisaragi; Yayoi; Uzuki; Satsuki; Minazuki; Fumizuki; Nagatsuki; Kikuzuki; Mikazuki; Mochizuki; Yūzuki | 1,315 tonnes | |
| Fubuki-class | | Destroyer | Fubuki; Shirayuki; Hatsuyuki; Miyuki; Murakumo; Shinonome; Usugumo; Shirakumo; Isonami; Uranami | 1,750 tonnes | Also known as "Special Type I Destroyers". |
| Ayanami-class | | Destroyer | Ayanami; Shikinami; Asagiri; Yūgiri; Amagiri; Sagiri; Oboro; Akebono; Sazanami; Ushio | 1,750 tonnes | Also known as "Special Type II Destroyers. |
| Akatsuki-class | | Destroyer | Akatsuki; Hibiki; Ikazuchi; Inazuma | 1,750 tonnes | Also known as "Special Type III Destroyers". |
| Hatsuharu-class | | Destroyer | Hatsuharu; Nenohi; Wakaba; Hatsushimo; Ariake; Yūgure | 1,530 tonnes | |
| Shiratsuyu-class | | Destroyer | Shiratsuyu; Shigure; Murasame; Yūdachi; Harusame; Samidare; Umikaze; Yamakaze; Kawakaze; Suzukaze | 1,685 tonnes | |
| Asashio-class | | Destroyer | Asashio | Ōshio | Michishio | Arashio | Natsugumo | Yamagumo | Minegumo | Asagumo | Arare | Kasumi | 1,685 tonnes | |
| Kagerō-class | | Destroyer | Kagerō | Shiranui | Kuroshio | Oyashio | Hayashio | Natsushio | Hatsukaze | Yukikaze | Amatsukaze | Tokitsukaze | Urakaze | Isokaze | Hamakaze | Tanikaze | Nowaki | Arashi | Hagikaze | Maikaze | Akigumo | 2,000 tonnes | Designated as "Type A Destroyers". |
| Yūgumo-class | Naganami | Destroyer | Yūgumo | Makigumo | Kazagumo | Naganami | Makinami | Takanami | Ōnami | Kiyonami | Tamanami | Suzunami | Fujinami | Hayanami | Hamanami | Okinami | Kishinami | Asashimo | Hayashimo | Akishimo | Kiyoshimo | 2,077 tonnes | Designated as "Type A Destroyers". |
| Akizuki-class | | Destroyer | Akizuki | Teruzuki | Suzutsuki | Hatsuzuki | Niizuki | Wakatsuki | Shimotsuki | 2,700 tonnes | Designated as "Type B Destroyers". |
| Fuyutsuki-class | | Destroyer | Fuyutsuki; Harutsuki; Yoizuki; Natsuzuki | 2,700 tonnes | Designated as "Type B Destroyers". Akizuki-subclass. |
| Michitsuki-class | | Destroyer | Hanazuki | 2,700 tonnes | Designated as "Type B Destroyers". Akizuki-subclass. 16 vessels planned with only 1 completed. |
| Shimakaze-class | | Destroyer | Shimakaze | 2,570 tonnes | Designated as "Type C Destroyers". She was an experimental destroyer, with new high-temperature, high-pressure steam turbines and mounting a total of 15 torpedo tubes. |
| Matsu-class | | Destroyer | Matsu | Take | Ume | Momo | Kuwa | Kiri | Sugi | Maki | Momi | Kashi | Kaya | Nara | Sakura | Yanagi | Tsubaki | Hinoki | Kaede | Keyaki | 1,260 tonnes | Designated as "Type D Destroyers". |
| Tachibana-class | | Destroyer | Tachibana | Kaki | Kaba | Tsuta | Hagi | Sumire | Kusunoki | Hatsuzakura | Nire | Nashi | Shii | Enoki | Odake | Hatsuume | 1,350 tonnes | Designated as "Type D Destroyers". Matsu-subclass. |

=== Torpedo boats ===
Torpedo Boat (12)
| Class | Picture | Type | Boats | Displacement | Note |
|---|---|---|---|---|---|
| Chidori-class | | Torpedo boat | Chidori | Manazuru | Tomozuru | Hatsukari | 600 tonnes | 20 vessel planned however only 4 completed. 16 replaced by Ōtori-class. |
| Ōtori-class | | Torpedo boat | Ōtori | Hiyodori | Hayabusa | Kasasagi | Kiji | Kari | Sagi | Hato | | 960 tonnes | 16 vessel planned however only 8 completed. |

=== Destroyer escorts (Kaibōkan) ===
Kaibōkan (178)
| Class | Picture | Type | Boats | Displacement | Note |
|---|---|---|---|---|---|
| Shimushu-class | | Kaibōkan | Shimushu | Kunashiri | Ishigaki | Hachijo | 874 tonnes | |
| Etorofu-class | | Kaibōkan | Etorofu | Matsuwa | Sado | Oki | Mutsure | Iki | Tsushima | Wakamiya | Hirado | Fukae | Amakusa | Manju | Kanju | Kasado | 884 tonnes | |
| Mikura-class | | Kaibōkan | Mikura | Miyake | Awaji | Nomi | Kurahashi | Yashiro | Chiburi | Kusagaki | 955 tonnes | |
| Ukuru-class | | Kaibōkan | Ukuru | Hiburi | Shonan | Daito | Okinawa | Kume | Ikuna | Shinnan | Yaku | Aguni | Mokuto | Inagi | Uku | Chikubu | Habushi | Sakito | Kuga | Ojika | Kozu | Kanawa | Shiga | Amami | Hodaka | Habuto | Iwo | Takane | Ikara | Shisaka | Ikuno | 955 tonnes | Includes the 9 vessels of the Hiburi subclass |
| Type C Kaibōkan | | Kaibōkan | CD-1 | CD-3 | CD-5 | CD-7 | CD-9 | CD-11 | CD-13 | CD-15 | CD-17 | CD-19 | CD-21 | CD-23 | CD-25 | CD-27 | CD-29 | CD-31 | CD-33 | CD-35 | CD-37 | CD-39 | CD-41 | CD-43 | CD-45 | CD-47 | CD-49 | CD-51 | CD-53 | CD-55 | CD-57 | CD-59 | CD-61 | CD-63 | CD-65 | CD-67 | CD-69 | CD-71 | CD-73 | CD-75 | CD-77 | CD-79 | CD-81 | CD-85 | CD-87 | CD-95 | CD-97 | CD-105 | CD-107 | CD-205 | CD-207 | CD-213 | CD-215 | CD-217 | CD-219 | CD-221 | CD-225 | CD-227 | 757 tonnes | |
| Type D Kaibōkan | | Kaibōkan | CD-2 | CD-4 | CD-6 | CD-10 | CD-12 | CD-14 | CD-16 | CD-18 | CD-20 | CD-22 | CD-24 | CD-26 | CD-28 | CD-30 | CD-32 | CD-34 | CD-36 | CD-38 | CD-40 | CD-42 | CD-44 | CD-46 | CD-48 | CD-50 | CD-52 | CD-54 | CD-56 | CD-58 | CD-60 | CD-64 | CD-66 | CD-68 | CD-70 | CD-72 | CD-74 | CD-76 | CD-78 | CD-80 | CD-82 | CD-84 | CD-102 | CD-104 | CD-106 | CD-112 | CD-116 | CD-118 | CD-124 | CD-126 | CD-130 | CD-132 | CD-134 | CD-138 | CD-142 | CD-144 | CD-150 | CD-154 | CD-156 | CD-158 | CD-160 | CD-186 | CD-190 | CD-192 | CD-194 | CD-196 | CD-198 | CD-200 | CD-202 | CD-204 | 752 tonnes | |
| Yasoshima-class | | Light cruiser Kaibōkan | Yasoshima; Ioshima | 2,448 tonnes | Chinise light cruisers seized in 1938 by the IJN, reporposed as Kaibōkans |

=== Patrol boats ===
Patrol Boat
| Class | Picture | Type | Boats | Displacement | Note |
|---|---|---|---|---|---|
| No.1-class auxiliary patrol boat | | Patrol boat | PBa-1 | PBa-2 | PBa-3 | PBa-25 | PBa-26 | PBa-31 | PBa-37 | PBa-51 | PBa-84 | PBa-90 | PBa-134 |PBa-135 | PBa-136 | PBa-137 | PBa-138 | PBa-152 | PBa-153 | PBa-163 | PBa-164 | PBa-165 | PBa-166 | PBa-173 | PBa-174 | PBa-175 | PBa-179 | PBa-191 | PBa-192 | 238 tons | 280 planned, 27 completed |

=== Submarine chasers ===
Submarine chaser
| Class | Picture | Type | Boats | Displacement | Note |
|---|---|---|---|---|---|
| No.1-class auxiliary submarine chaser | | Submarine chaser | Cha-1 | Cha-2 | Cha-3 | Cha-4 | Cha-5 | Cha-6 | Cha-7 | Cha-8 | Cha-9 | Cha-10 | Cha-11 | Cha-12 | Cha-13 | Cha-14 | Cha-15 | Cha-16 | Cha-17 | Cha-18 | Cha-19 | Cha-20 | Cha-21 | Cha-22 | Cha-23 | Cha-24 | Cha-25 | Cha-26 | Cha-27 | Cha-28 | Cha-29 | Cha-30 | Cha-31 | Cha-32 | Cha-33 | Cha-34 | Cha-35 | Cha-36 | Cha-37 | Cha-38 | Cha-39 | Cha-40 | Cha-41 | Cha-42 | Cha-43 | Cha-44 | Cha-45 | Cha-46 | Cha-47 | Cha-48 | Cha-49 | Cha-50 | Cha-51 | Cha-52 | Cha-53 | Cha-54 | Cha-55 | Cha-56 | Cha-57 | Cha-58 | Cha-59 | Cha-60 | Cha-61 | Cha-62 | Cha-63 | Cha-64 | Cha-65 | Cha-66 | Cha-67 | Cha-68 | Cha-69 | Cha-70 | Cha-71 | Cha-72 | Cha-73 | Cha-74 | Cha-75 | Cha-76 | Cha-77 | Cha-78 | Cha-79 | Cha-80 | Cha-81 | Cha-82 | Cha-83 | Cha-84 | Cha-85 | Cha-86 | Cha-87 | Cha-88 | Cha-89 | Cha-90 | Cha-91 | Cha-92 | Cha-93 | Cha-94 | Cha-95 | Cha-96 | Cha-97 | Cha-98 | Cha-99 | Cha-100 | Cha-151 | Cha-152 | Cha-153 | Cha-154 | Cha-155 | Cha-156 | Cha-157 | Cha-158 | Cha-159 | Cha-160 | Cha-161 | Cha-162 | Cha-163 | Cha-164 | Cha-165 | Cha-166 | Cha-167 | Cha-168 | Cha-169 | Cha-170 | Cha-171 | Cha-172 | Cha-173 | Cha-174 | Cha-175 | Cha-176 | Cha-177 | Cha-178 | Cha-179 | Cha-180 | Cha-181 | Cha-182 | Cha-183 | Cha-184 | Cha-185 | Cha-186 | Cha-187 | Cha-188 | Cha-189 | Cha-190 | Cha-191 | Cha-192 | Cha-193 | Cha-194 | Cha-195 | Cha-196 | Cha-197 | Cha-198 | Cha-199 | Cha-200 | Cha-201 | Cha-202 | Cha-203 | Cha-204 | Cha-205 | Cha-206 | Cha-207 | Cha-208 | Cha-209 | Cha-210 | Cha-211 | Cha-212 | Cha-213 | Cha-214 | Cha-215 | Cha-216 | Cha-217 | Cha-218 | Cha-219 | Cha-220 | Cha-221 | Cha-222 | Cha-223 | Cha-224 | Cha-225 | Cha-226 | Cha-227 | Cha-228 | Cha-229 | Cha-230 | Cha-231 | Cha-232 | Cha-233 | Cha-234 | Cha-235 | Cha-236 | Cha-237 | Cha-238 | Cha-239 | Cha-240 | Cha-241 | Cha-242 | Cha-243 | Cha-244 | Cha-245 | Cha-246 | Cha-247 | Cha-248 | Cha-249 | Cha-250 | 130 tons | 200 planned, 200 completed |

== Submarines ==
1st Class submarines
| Class | Picture | Type | Boats | Displacement | Note |
|---|---|---|---|---|---|
| I-51-class / Kaidai Type | | Cruiser submarine | I-51 | I-152 | I-153 | I-154 | I-155 | I-156 | I-157 | I-158 | I-159 | I-60 | I-63 | I-61 | I-162 | I-164 | I-165 | I-66 | I-67 | I-168 | I-169 | I-70 | I-171 | I-73 | I-174 | I-175 | I-176 | I-177 | I-178 | I-179 | I-180 | I-181 | I-182 | I-183 | I-184 | I-185 | 1,575 tonnes | Includes the subtypes KD1, KD2, KD3, KD4, KD5, KD6, and KD7 |
| I-1-class / Junsen Type | | Cruiser submarine | I-1 | I-2 | I-3 | I-4 | I-5 | I-6 | I-7 | I-8 | 1,970 tonnes | Includes the subtypes J1, J1M, J2, and J3 |
| I-9-class / Junsen Type A | | Cruiser submarine Submarine aircraft carrier | I-9 | I-10 | I-11 | I-12 | I-13 | I-14 | 2,434 tonnes | Includes the subtypes A1, A2, and A3 |
| I-15-class / Junsen Type B | | Cruiser submarine Submarine aircraft carrier | I-15 | I-17 | I-19 | I-21 | I-23 | I-25 | I-26 | I-27 | I-29 | I-30 | I-31 | I-32 | I-33 | I-34 | I-35 | I-36 | I-37 | I-38 | I-39 | I-40 | I-41 | I-42 | I-43 | I-44 | I-45 | I-54 | I-56 | I-58 | 2,184 tonnes | Includes the subtypes B1, B2, and B3 |
| I-16-class / Junsen Type C | | Cruiser submarine | I-16 | I-18 | I-20 | I-22 | I-24 | I-46 | I-47 | I-48 | I-52 | I-53 | I-55 | 2,184 tonnes | Includes the subtypes C1, and C2 |
| I-361-class / Type D / Sen'yu-Dai Type | | Submarine | I-361 | I-362 | I-363 | I-364 | I-365 | I-366 | I-367 | I-368 | I-369 | I-370 | I-371 | I-372 | I-373 | 1,440 tonnes | Includes the subtypes D1, and D2 |
| I-121-class / Kiraisen Type | | Submarine | I-121 | I-122 | I-123 | I-124 | 1,142 tonnes | |
| I-351-class / Senho Type | | Submarine | I-351 | 3,512 tonnes | Planned 6. Completed 1. |
| I-201-class / Sentaka-Dai Type | | Submarine | I-201; I-202; I-203 | 1,503 tonnes | |
| I-400-class / Sentoku Type | | Submarine aircraft carrier | I-400; I-401; I-402 | 6,560 tonnes | |
| I-501-class | | Submarine | I-501 | 1,616 tonnes | Was German Kriegsmarine submarine under the name U-181, until given to Japan May 1945. |
| I-502-class | | Submarine | I-502 | 1,610 tonnes | Was German Kriegsmarine submarine under the name U-862, until given to Japan May 1945. |
| I-503-class | | Submarine | I-503 | 1,610 tonnes | Was a Regia Marina submarine under the name Comandante Cappelini then captured by IJN after Italy's capitulation then given to Kriegsmarine in September 1943 under the name UIT-24. After that captured again by IJN in May 1945 after Nazi-Germany's surrender. |
| I-504-class | | Submarine | I-504 | 1,763 tonnes | Was Regia Marina submarine under the name Luigi Torelli then it was temporarily interned to IJN after Italy's capitulation then given to Kriegsmarine in September 1943 under the name UIT-25. After that captured again by IJN in May 1945 after Nazi-Germany's surrender. |
| I-505-class | | Submarine | I-505 | 1,763 tonnes | Was German Kriegsmarine submarine under the name U-219, until given to Japan May 1945. |
| I-506-class | | Submarine | I-506 | 1,610 tonnes | Was German Kriegsmarine submarine under the name U-195, until given to Japan May 1945. |

2nd Class submarines
| Class | Picture | Type | Boats | Displacement | Note |
|---|---|---|---|---|---|
| Ro-11-class / Kaichū type | | Submarine | Ro-11 | Ro-12 | Ro-13 | Ro-14 | Ro-15 | Ro-16 | Ro-17 | Ro-18 | Ro-19 | Ro-20 | Ro-21 | Ro-22 | Ro-23 | Ro-24 | Ro-25 | Ro-26 | Ro-27 | Ro-28 | Ro-29 | Ro-30 | Ro-31 | Ro-32 | Ro-33 | Ro-34 | Ro-35 | Ro-36 | Ro-37 | Ro-37 | Ro-38 | Ro-39 | Ro-40 | Ro-41 | Ro-42 | Ro-43 | Ro-44 | Ro-45 | Ro-46 | Ro-47 | Ro-48 | Ro-49 | Ro-50 | Ro-55 | Ro-56 | 720 tonnes | Includes subtypes K1, K2, K3, K4, K5/Toku-Chū, K6, and K7/Sen-Chū |
| Ro-51-class / Type L | | Submarine | Ro-51 | Ro-52 | Ro-53 | Ro-54 | Ro-55 | Ro-56 | Ro-57 | Ro-58 | Ro-59 | Ro-60 | Ro-61 | Ro-62 | Ro-63 | Ro-64 | Ro-65 | Ro-66 | Ro-67 | Ro-68 | 893 tonnes | Includes subtypes L1, L2, L3, and L4 |
| Ro-100-class / Senshō Type | | Submarine | Ro-100 | Ro-101 | Ro-102 | Ro-103 | Ro-104 | Ro-105 | Ro-106 | Ro-107 | Ro-108 | Ro-109 | Ro-110 | Ro-111 | Ro-112 | Ro-113 | Ro-114 | Ro-115 | Ro-116 | Ro-117 | 525 tonnes | |
| Ro-500-class | | Submarine | Ro-500 | 1,120 tonnes | Was German Kriegsmarine submarine under the name U-511, until given to Japan 16 September 1943. |
| Ro-501-class | | Submarine | Ro-501 | 1,144 tonnes | Was German Kriegsmarine submarine under the name U-1224, until given to Japan 15 February 1944. |

3rd Class submarines
| Class | Picture | Type | Boats | Displacement | Note |
|---|---|---|---|---|---|
| Ha-101-class / Sen'yu-Shō Type | (left to right) Ibuki, Ha-105, Ha-106 and Ha-109 | Transport submarine | Ha-101 | Ha-102 | Ha-103 | Ha-104 | Ha-105 | Ha-106 | Ha-107 | Ha-108 | Ha-109 | Ha-111 | 370 tonnes | |
| Ha-201-class / Sentaka-Shō Type | Ha-202 | Submarine | Ha-201 | Ha-202 | Ha-203 | Ha-204 | Ha-205 | Ha-207 | Ha-208 | Ha-209 | Ha-210 | Ha-216 | 320 tonnes | Never saw combat |
| Kō-hyōteki-class | Ha-19 | Midget submarine | 46 × Type 'A'; 5 × Type 'B'; 47 × Type 'C'; 115 x Type 'D' | 47 tonnes | |
| Kairyū-class | Kairyu | Midget submarine | 200 or 213 | 21.3 tonnes | Never saw combat |
| Kaiten-class | Kaiten | Suicide torpedo | approx. 420 | 9.1 tonnes | |
| Yu-class / Type 3 submergence transport vehicle | | Transport submarine | Yu-1 | Yu-2 | Yu-3 | Yu-4 | Yu-5 | Yu-6 | Yu-7 | Yu-8 | Yu-9 | Yu-10 | Yu-11 | Yu-12 | Yu-13 | Yu-14 | Yu-15 | Yu-16 | Yu-17 | Yu-18 | Yu-19 | Yu-20 | Yu-21 | Yu-22 | Yu-23 | Yu-24 | Yu-1001 | Yu-1002 | Yu-1003 | Yu-1005 | Yu-1006 | Yu-1007 | Yu-1008 | Yu-1009 | Yu-1010 | Yu-2001 | Yu-2002 | Yu-3001 | Yu-3002 | Yu-3003 | 274 tonnes | Used by Imperial Japanese Army. |

== Submarine tender ==
Submarine Tender (3)
| Class | Picture | Type | Ships | Displacement | Note |
|---|---|---|---|---|---|
| Jingei-class | Jingei (above) and Chōgei in 1924 | Submarine tender | Jingei; Chōgei | 6,240 tonnes | |
| Taigei-class | Jingei (above) and Chōgei in 1924 | Submarine tender | Taigei | 16,700 tonnes | Converted into Light aircraft carrier. |
| Komahashi | Komahashi in 1933 | Submarine tender | Komahashi | 1,230 tonnes | Cargo ship conversion, later reconverted into a Survey ship. |
| Hikawa Maru-class | Heian Maru 1937 | Submarine tender | Heian Maru | 11,615 tonnes | Ocean liner conversion |

== Gunboats ==
Gunboats (20)
| Class | Picture | Type | Ships | Displacement | Note |
|---|---|---|---|---|---|
| Japanese gunboat Saga | | River gunboat | Saga | 793 | Improvement of Uji (1903) |
| Hashidate-class | | Gunboat | Hashidate; Uji | 1,009 | |
| Japanese gunboat Ataka | | River gunboat | Ataka | 880 | |
| Fushimi-class | | River gunboat | Fushimi; Sumida | 356 | |
| Luzon-class | | River gunboat | Karatsu | 509 | Salvaged from the US wreck |
| USS Wake (PR-3) | | River gunboat | Tatara | 360 | The only US ship surrendered to Japanese during World War II |
| Azio-class | | Gunboat | Okitsu | 625 | Salvaged from the Italian wreck |
| Insect-class | Suma | River gunboat | Suma | 635 | Salvaged from the British wreck |
| Atami-class | Atami | River gunboat | Atami; Futami | 249 | |
| Seta-class | | River gunboat | Seta; Katata; Hira; Hozu | 343 | |
| Japanese gunboat Kotaka | | River gunboat | Kotaka | 57 | Simplified Atami-class gunboat for shallow water (0.64m draft) operations |
| Japanese gunboat Toba | | River gunboat | Toba | 220 | |
| Kozakura-class | | River gunboat | Kozakura; Shiraume | 30 | |
| Shōkai Maru-class | | Gunboat | Shōkai Maru; Eikai Maru | | Official designation was a high-powered tugboat, however, they did not have any towing facilities. They were actually gunboats and escort ships. |

== Mine warfare vessels ==
Minesweepers (35), minelayers (33) and netlayers (1)
| Class | Picture | Type | Ships | Displacement, tonnes | Note |
|---|---|---|---|---|---|
| Hatsutaka-class | | Minelayer | Hatsutaka; Aotaka; Wakataka | 1,626 | |
| Japanese minelayer Shirataka | | Netlayer | Shirataka | 1,540 | |
| Japanese cruiser Tokiwa | | Minelayer | Tokiwa | 9,667 | Converted to minelayer in 1922 |
| Japanese minelayer Itsukushima | Itsukushima, circa 1935. | Minelayer | Itsukushima | 2,002 | First ever Japanese Navy diesel ship |
| Kamishima-class | | Minelayer | Kamishima; Awashima | 778 | |
| Japanese survey ship Katsuriki | | Minelayer | Katsuriki | 1,565 | First purpose-built ocean-going minelayer of Japanese Navy, converted to survey ship in 1942 |
| Japanese minelayer Minoo | | Minelayer | Minoo | 3,276 | |
| Japanese minelayer Okinoshima | | Minelayer | Okinoshima | 4,359 | Carry a reconnaissance floatplane |
| Natsushima-class | | Minelayer | Natsushima; Nasami; Sarushima | 483 | |
| Tsubame-class | | Minelayer | Tsubame; Kamome | 457 | |
| Sokuten-class | | Minelayer | Toshima | Kuroshima | Ashizaki | Katoku | Entō | Kurokami | Katashima | Enoshima | Ninoshima | Kurosaki | Washizaki | 411 | 2 prototypes of this class decommissioned before World War II |
| MV Tenyo Maru (1935) | | Minelayer | Tenyo Maru | 6,843 | |
| Japanese minelayer Tsugaru | | Minelayer | Tsugaru | 4,064 | Carry a reconnaissance floatplane |
| Japanese minelayer Yaeyama | | Minelayer | Yaeyama | 1,153 | Refit as anti-submarine warfare vessel in 1943 |
| Hashima-class | | Minelayer | Hashima | Tsurushima | Ōtate | Tateishi | 1,585 | Used to lay remote-controlled mines in coastal fortifications |
| W-1-class | W-3 in 1923 | Minesweeper | W-1 | W-2 | W-3 | W-4 | W-5 | W-6 | 610 | |
| W-7-class | | Minesweeper | W-7 | W-8 | W-9 | W-10 | W-11 | W-12 | 640 | Actually newer than W-13 class |
| W-13-class | | Minesweeper | W-13 | W-14 | W-15 | W-16 | W-17 | W-18 | 533 | |
| W-19-class | | Minesweeper | W-19 | W-20 | W-21 | W-22 | W-23 | W-24 | W-25 | W-26 | W-27 | W-28 | W-29 | W-30 | W-33 | W-34 | W-39 | W-41 | 658 | Primary Japanese minesweeper during World War II |
| Wa-1-class auxiliary minesweeper | | Minesweeper | Wa-1 | Wa-2 | Wa-3 | Wa-4 | Wa-5 | Wa-6 | Wa-7 | Wa-8 | Wa-9 | Wa-10 | Wa-11 | Wa-12 | Wa-13 | Wa-14 | Wa-15 | Wa-16 | Wa-17 | Wa-18 | Wa-19 | Wa-20 | Wa-21 | Wa-22 | | |

== Auxiliary vessels ==
=== Food Supply Ship ===
Food Supply Ship (8)
| Class | Picture | Type | Ships | Displacement | Note |
|---|---|---|---|---|---|
| Mamiya-class | | Food supply ship | Mamiya | 15,820 tonnes | |
| Ekkai-class | | Food supply ship | Ekkai Maru | 2,984 tonnes | Originally belonging to Honduras, he was captured in Shanghai the same day the country declared war on Japan. |
| Nosaki-class | | Food supply ship | Nosaki | 650 tonnes | |
| Kinesaki-class | | Food supply ship | Kinesaki; Hayasaki; Shirasaki; Arasaki | 910 tonnes | |
| Irako-class | | Food supply ship | Irako | 9,570 tonnes | |
| Kurasaki-class | | Food supply ship | Kurasaki | | |
| Muroto-class | | Food supply ship | Muroto | 8,125 tonnes | |
| Kitakami Maru-class | | Food supply ship | Kitakami Maru | 498 tonnes | |

=== Repair ship ===
Repair Ship (2)
| Class | Picture | Type | Ships | Displacement | Note |
|---|---|---|---|---|---|
| Asahi-class | | Repair ship | Asahi | 15,200 tonnes | Converted from Pre-dreadnought battleship. |
| Akashi-class | | Repair ship | Akashi | 9,000 tonnes | |

=== Survey ship ===
Survey Ships (1)
| Class | Picture | Type | Ships | Displacement | Note |
|---|---|---|---|---|---|
| Tsukushi-class | | Survey ship | Tsukushi | 1,422 tonnes | Planned 2. Cancelled 1. |

== See also ==
- List of Japanese military equipment of World War II
- List of ships of the Imperial Japanese Navy
- List of ships of World War II
