= Japanese escort ship CD-76 =

History

Imperial Japanese Navy
- Name: CD-76
- Builder: Mitsubishi Heavy Industries, Ltd, Nagasaki
- Laid down: 1 November 1944
- Launched: 18 November 1944
- Sponsored by: Imperial Japanese Navy
- Completed: 23 December 1944
- Commissioned: 23 December 1944
- Fate: ceded to the Soviet Union,28 August 1947

History

Soviet Navy
- Name: EK-44
- Acquired: 28 August 1947
- Commissioned: 25 September 1947
- Renamed: TsL-45 (1948); СКР-49 (1954)
- Home port: Vladivostok
- Fate: transferred to Peoples Liberation Army Navy, 25 June 195

History

People's Liberation Army Navy
- Acquired: 25 June 1955
- Fate: unknown

General characteristics
- Type: Type D escort ship
- Displacement: 740 long tons (752 t) standard
- Length: 69.5 m (228 ft)
- Beam: 8.6 m (28 ft 3 in)
- Draught: 3.05 m (10 ft)
- Propulsion: 1 shaft, geared turbine engines, 2,500 hp (1,864 kW)
- Speed: 17.5 knots (20.1 mph; 32.4 km/h)
- Range: 4,500 nmi (8,300 km) at 16 kn (18 mph; 30 km/h)
- Complement: 160
- Sensors & processing systems: Type 22-Go radar; Type 93 sonar; Type 3 hydrophone
- Armament: As built : 2 × 120 mm (4.7 in)/45 cal DP guns; 6 × Type 96 25 mm (0.98 in) AA machine guns (2×3); 12 × Type 3 depth charge throwers; 1 × depth charge chute; 120 × depth charges; 1 × 81 mm (3.2 in) mortar

CD-76 or No. 76 was a Type D escort ship of the Imperial Japanese Navy during World War II.

== History ==
She was laid down on 1 August 1944 at the Nagasaki shipyard of Mitsubishi Heavy Industries, Ltd for the benefit of the Imperial Japanese Navy. She was launched on 18 November 1944 and completed and commissioned on 23 December 1944. After completing her training at Saiki under Captain Masamitsu Tsugu (澁谷政光), she departed for Kure and then arrived at Moji-ku, Kitakyūshū on 24 February 1945. She served as an escort along with the Ukuru-class escort ship Habushi, CD-112, and submarine chaser CH-17 for convoy MOTA-39 consisting of 5 transports (including Masashima Maru and Akishima Maru) which assembled at nearby Mutsure Island. Departing on 26 February 1945, the convoy hugged the Chinese coast sheltering in various harbors before arriving safely at Keelung on 9 March 1945 (Masashima Maru and Akishima Maru left the convoy on 8 March 1945 for Amoy). On 13 March 1945, she departed from Kirun for Moji in convoy TAMO-48 with fellow escort ships Habushi and CD-112 arriving on 23 March 1945. For the remainder of the war, she conducted patrols, escort, and replenishment duty near the Tsushima Islands between Chinkai and Iki Island.

On 1 December 1945, she served as one of 269 Japanese ships that served as a minesweeper under the Allied forces after the war. On 28 August 1947, she was one of 34 vessels ceded to Soviet Union as a war reparation. On 25 September 1947, she was commissioned into the Soviet Pacific Ocean Fleet. She arrived at Vladivostok in October 1947 and was designated as guard ship EK-44 (ЭК-44). In 1948, she was re-designated as target ship TsL-45. In November 1954, she was re-designated as patrol boat СКР-49 (SKR-49). On 25 June 1955, she was transferred to the Peoples Liberation Army Navy. Her ultimate fate is unknown.

== Bibliography ==
- Dodson, Aidan & Cant, Serena (2020). Spoils of War: The Fate of Enemy Fleets after Two World Wars. Barnsley, UK: Seaforth Publishing. ISBN 978-1-5267-4198-1.
