= Japanese escort ship CD-118 =

History

Empire of Japan
- Name: CD-118
- Builder: Kawasaki Shipyard Co., Ltd., Kobe
- Laid down: 8 June 1944
- Launched: 20 November 1944
- Completed: 27 December 1944
- Commissioned: 27 December 1944
- Decommissioned: 5 October 1945
- Out of service: surrender of Japan, 2 September 1945
- Fate: ceded to the Republic of China, 6 July 1947

Republic of China
- Acquired: 31 July 1947:
- Renamed: Chieh 12
- Fate: Seized by the People's Republic of China, 23 April 1949

People's Republic of China
- Namesake: Changsha
- Acquired: 1949
- Renamed: Changsha; 长沙
- Stricken: 1986
- Identification: 216
- Fate: Sunk as target ship, 1982

General characteristics
- Type: Type D escort ship
- Displacement: 740 long tons (750 t) standard
- Length: 69.5 m (228 ft)
- Beam: 8.6 m (28 ft 3 in)
- Draught: 3.05 m (10 ft 0 in)
- Propulsion: 1 shaft, geared turbine engines, 2,500 hp (1,864 kW)
- Speed: 17.5 knots (32.4 km/h; 20.1 mph)
- Range: 4,500 nmi (8,300 km; 5,200 mi) at 16 kn (30 km/h; 18 mph)
- Complement: 160
- Sensors & processing systems: Type 22-Go radar; Type 93 sonar; Type 3 hydrophone
- Armament: As built : 2 × 120 mm (4.7 in)/45 cal DP guns; 6 × Type 96 25 mm (0.98 in) AA machine guns (2×3); 12 × Type 3 depth charge throwers; 1 × depth charge chute; 120 × depth charges; 1 × 81 mm (3.2 in) mortar

CD-118 or No. 118 was a Type D escort ship of the Imperial Japanese Navy during World War II.

== History ==
She was laid down on 8 June 1944 at the Kobe shipyard of Kawasaki Shipyard Co., Ltd. for the benefit of the Imperial Japanese Navy and launched on 20 November 1944. On 27 December 1944, she was completed and commissioned. On 15 August 1945, Japan announced their unconditional surrender and she was turned over to the Allies. On 5 October 1945, she was removed from the Navy List. She was assigned to the Allied Repatriation Service and went on numerous repatriation journeys.

On 31 July 1947, she was ceded to the Republic of China as a war reparation and renamed Chieh 12.

In 1949, she was seized by forces of the People's Republic of China.

== Bibliography ==
- Dodson, Aidan & Cant, Serena (2020). Spoils of War: The Fate of Enemy Fleets after Two World Wars. Seaforth Publishing. ISBN 978-1-5267-4198-1.
