= Japanese escort ship CD-198 =

Japanese escort ship

History

Imperial Japanese Navy
- Name: CD-198
- Builder: Mitsubishi Heavy Industries, Nagasaki
- Laid down: 31 December 1944
- Launched: 26 February 1945
- Sponsored by: Imperial Japanese Navy
- Completed: 11 March 1945
- Commissioned: 11 March 1945
- Out of service: surrender of Japan, 2 September 1945
- Stricken: 5 October 1945
- Fate: ceded to the Republic of China, 31 July 1947

History

Republic of China Navy
- Acquired: 31 July 1947
- Renamed: Hsian
- Fate: Seized by the People's Republic of China, 1949

History

People's Liberation Army Navy
- Acquired: 1949
- Renamed: Xian
- Stricken: 1986
- Identification: 220
- Fate: unknown

General characteristics
- Type: Type D escort ship
- Displacement: 740 long tons (752 t) standard
- Length: 69.5 m (228 ft)
- Beam: 8.6 m (28 ft 3 in)
- Draught: 3.05 m (10 ft)
- Propulsion: 1 shaft, geared turbine engines, 2,500 hp (1,864 kW)
- Speed: 17.5 knots (20.1 mph; 32.4 km/h)
- Range: 4,500 nmi (8,300 km) at 16 kn (18 mph; 30 km/h)
- Complement: 160
- Sensors & processing systems: Type 22-Go radar; Type 93 sonar; Type 3 hydrophone
- Armament: As built : 2 × 120 mm (4.7 in)/45 cal DP guns; 6 × Type 96 25 mm (0.98 in) AA machine guns (2×3); 12 × Type 3 depth charge throwers; 1 × depth charge chute; 120 × depth charges; 1 × 81 mm (3.2 in) mortar

CD-198 or No. 198 was a Type D escort ship of the Imperial Japanese Navy during World War II.

== History ==
She was laid down on 31 December 1944 at the Nagasaki shipyard of Mitsubishi Heavy Industries for the benefit of the Imperial Japanese Navy and launched on 26 February 1945. On 11 March 1945, she was completed and commissioned. On 10 August 1945, she was damaged along with CD-194 by enemy aircraft in the Tsushima Strait at 34°42′N 130°13′E. On 15 August 1945, Japan announced their unconditional surrender and she was turned over to the Allies in September 1945. On 5 October 1945, she was struck from the Navy List. On 1 December 1945, she was assigned to the Allied Repatriation Service.

On 31 July 1947, she was ceded to the Republic of China as a war reparation and renamed Hsian.

In 1949, she was taken over by the People's Republic of China.

== Bibliography ==
- Dodson, Aidan & Cant, Serena (2020). Spoils of War: The Fate of Enemy Fleets after Two World Wars. Seaforth Publishing. ISBN 978-1-5267-4198-1.
