= Japanese escort ship CD-202 =

History

Empire of Japan
- Name: CD-202
- Builder: Mitsubishi Heavy Industries, Nagasaki
- Laid down: 16 February 1945
- Launched: 2 April 1945
- Sponsored by: Imperial Japanese Navy
- Completed: 7 July 1945
- Commissioned: 7 July 1945
- Out of service: surrender of Japan, 2 September 1945
- Stricken: 20 November 1945
- Fate: Scrapped, 1947

General characteristics
- Type: Type D escort ship
- Displacement: 740 long tons (752 t) standard
- Length: 69.5 m (228 ft)
- Beam: 8.6 m (28 ft 3 in)
- Draught: 3.05 m (10 ft)
- Propulsion: 1 shaft, geared turbine engines, 2,500 hp (1,864 kW)
- Speed: 17.5 knots (20.1 mph; 32.4 km/h)
- Range: 4,500 nmi (8,300 km) at 16 kn (18 mph; 30 km/h)
- Complement: 160
- Sensors & processing systems: Type 22-Go radar; Type 93 sonar; Type 3 hydrophone
- Armament: As built : 2 × 120 mm (4.7 in)/45 cal DP guns; 6 × Type 96 25 mm (0.98 in) AA machine guns (2×3); 12 × Type 3 depth charge throwers; 1 × depth charge chute; 120 × depth charges; 1 × 81 mm (3.2 in) mortar

CD-202 or No. 202 was a Type D escort ship of the Imperial Japanese Navy during World War II.

== History ==
She was laid down on 16 February 1945 at the Nagasaki shipyard of Mitsubishi Heavy Industries for the benefit of the Imperial Japanese Navy and launched on 2 April 1945. On 7 July 1945, she was completed and commissioned. On 15 August 1945, Japan announced their unconditional surrender and CD-202 traveled to Sasebo where on 17 August 1945, a steam pipe exploded killing one man. On 30 November 1945, she was struck from the Navy List. She was scrapped in 1947.
