= Japanese gunboat Ataka =

Japanese and Chinese navy ship (1922–1947)

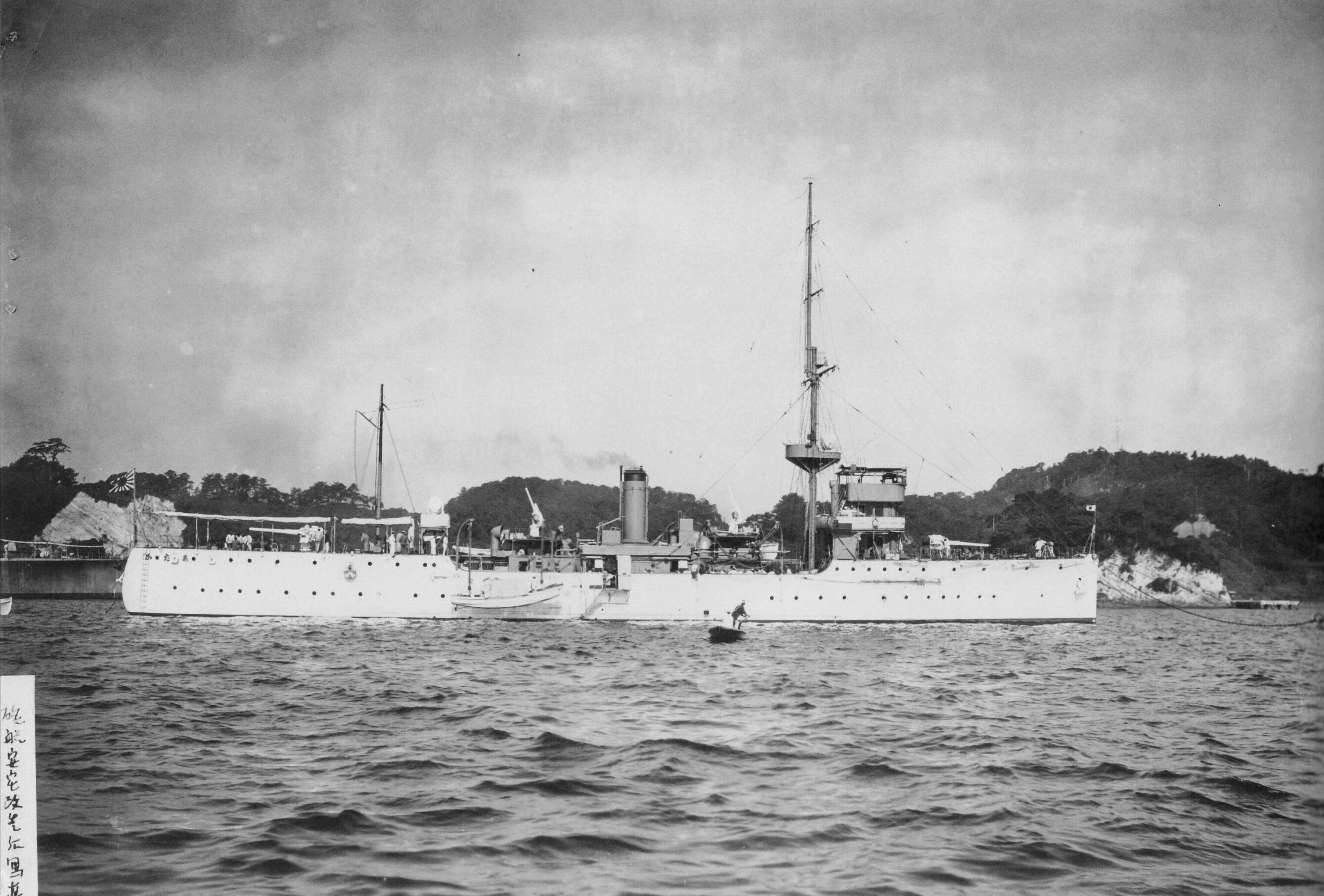
- Ataka in 1922

History

Empire of Japan
- Name: Ataka
- Builder: Yokohama Dock Co.
- Laid down: 15 August 1921
- Launched: 11 April 1922
- Completed: 12 August 1922
- Stricken: 3 May 1947
- Fate: Ceded to the Republic of China as a war prize, 17 September 1945

Republic of China
- Name: Andong
- Namesake: Andong
- Acquired: 17 September 1945
- Fate: Defected to the People's Liberation Army Navy 27 April 1949

People's Republic of China
- Acquired: 27 April 1949
- Fate: Sunk 23 September 1949 by Chinese Nationalist Aircraft

General characteristics
- Displacement: 880 long tons (894 t) (standard); 1,130 long tons (1,148 t) (full load)
- Length: 67.67 m (222 ft 0 in) o/a
- Beam: 9.75 m (32 ft 0 in)
- Draft: 2.2 m (7 ft 3 in)
- Installed power: 1,700 shp (1,300 kW)
- Propulsion: 2 × Vertical triple expansion steam turbines; 2 × Kampon boilers; 2 × shafts; 235 tons coal
- Speed: 16 knots (30 km/h; 18 mph)
- Range: 2,500 nmi (4,600 km; 2,900 mi) at 12 kn (22 km/h; 14 mph)
- Complement: 118
- Armament: 2 × 12 cm (4.7 in)/45 cal. guns; 2 × 7.6 cm (3.0 in)/ 40 cal. guns; 6 × Type 92 7.7 mm (0.30 in) anti-aircraft machine guns

Ataka (安宅) was a river gunboat of the Imperial Japanese Navy that operated on the Yangtze River in China during the 1930s, and during the Second Sino-Japanese War.

On 20 May 1933 Ataka was incorporated into the 3rd Fleet, as flagship of the 11th Gunboat Sentai. She was supplanted by the Yaeyama as flagship in 1937.

Based in Shanghai during the Second Sino-Japanese War, Ataka was transferred to the Republic of China Navy after the war. She defected to the People's Liberation Army Navy in 1949, and was sunk in Wuhu by Nationalist aircraft on 23 September the same year.

== Sources ==
- Japanese gunboats (with photos) (in Japanese)
- Vessels of the IJN
- Monograph 144 Chapter II
