= Japanese escort ship CD-192 =

History

Empire of Japan
- Name: CD-192
- Builder: Mitsubishi Heavy Industries, Nagasaki
- Laid down: 5 December 1944
- Launched: 30 January 1945
- Sponsored by: Imperial Japanese Navy
- Completed: 28 February 1945
- Commissioned: 28 February 1945
- Out of service: surrender of Japan, 2 September 1945
- Stricken: 25 October 1945
- Fate: ceded to the Republic of China, 7 July 1947

History

Republic of China Navy
- Acquired: 7 July 1947
- Renamed: Tong An
- Stricken: 1960

General characteristics
- Type: Type D escort ship
- Displacement: 740 long tons (752 t) standard
- Length: 69.5 m (228 ft)
- Beam: 8.6 m (28 ft 3 in)
- Draught: 3.05 m (10 ft)
- Propulsion: 1 shaft, geared turbine engines, 2,500 hp (1,864 kW)
- Speed: 17.5 knots (20.1 mph; 32.4 km/h)
- Range: 4,500 nmi (8,300 km) at 16 kn (18 mph; 30 km/h)
- Complement: 160
- Sensors & processing systems: Type 22-Go radar; Type 93 sonar; Type 3 hydrophone
- Armament: As built : 2 × 120 mm (4.7 in)/45 cal DP guns; 6 × Type 96 25 mm (0.98 in) AA machine guns (2×3); 12 × Type 3 depth charge throwers; 1 × depth charge chute; 120 × depth charges; 1 × 81 mm (3.2 in) mortar

CD-192 or No. 192 was a Type D escort ship of the Imperial Japanese Navy during World War II and later the Republic of China Navy.

== History ==
She was laid down on 5 December 1944 at the Nagasaki shipyard of Mitsubishi Heavy Industries for the benefit of the Imperial Japanese Navy and launched on 30 January 1945. On 28 February 1945, she was completed and commissioned. On 15 August 1945, Japan announced their unconditional surrender and she was turned over to the Allies. On 25 October 1945, she was struck from the Navy List. She was assigned to the Allied Repatriation Service and went on numerous repatriation journeys.

On 7 July 1947, she was ceded to the Republic of China as a war reparation and renamed Tong An (同安). She was struck from the Naval List in 1960.

== Bibliography ==
- Dodson, Aidan & Cant, Serena (2020). Spoils of War: The Fate of Enemy Fleets after Two World Wars. Seaforth Publishing. ISBN 978-1-5267-4198-1.
