= Japanese escort ship CD-190 =

History

Empire of Japan
- Name: CD-190
- Builder: Mitsubishi Heavy Industries, Nagasaki
- Laid down: 20 November 1944
- Launched: 16 January 1945
- Sponsored by: Imperial Japanese Navy
- Completed: 21 February 1945
- Commissioned: 21 February 1945
- Out of service: September 1945
- Stricken: 30 November 1945
- Fate: Scrapped, 31 March 1948

General characteristics
- Class & type: Type D escort ship
- Displacement: 740 long tons (752 t) standard
- Length: 69.5 m (228 ft)
- Beam: 8.6 m (28 ft 3 in)
- Draught: 3.05 m (10 ft)
- Propulsion: 1 shaft, geared turbine engines, 2,500 hp (1,864 kW)
- Speed: 17.5 knots (20.1 mph; 32.4 km/h)
- Range: 4,500 nmi (8,300 km) at 16 kn (18 mph; 30 km/h)
- Complement: 160
- Sensors & processing systems: Type 22-Go radar; Type 93 sonar; Type 3 hydrophone
- Armament: As built : 2 × 120 mm (4.7 in)/45 cal DP guns; 6 × Type 96 25 mm (0.98 in) AA machine guns (2×3); 12 × Type 3 depth charge throwers; 1 × depth charge chute; 120 × depth charges; 1 × 81 mm (3.2 in) mortar

CD-190 or No. 190 was a Type D escort ship of the Imperial Japanese Navy during World War II.

== History ==
She was laid down on 20 November 1944 at the Nagasaki shipyard of Mitsubishi Heavy Industries for the benefit of the Imperial Japanese Navy and launched on 16 January 1945. On 21 February 1945, she was completed and commissioned. On 28 July 1945, she was attacked by planes from Task Force 38 and heavily damaged in the Yura Straits off Tomogashima. On 15 August 1945, Japan announced their unconditional surrender and she was turned over to the Allies in September 1945 at Shiminoseki. On 30 November 1945, she was struck from the Navy List and scrapped on 31 March 1948.
