= Japanese escort ship CD-154 =

Japanese empire military vessel

History

Empire of Japan
- Name: CD-154
- Builder: Harima Shipyard Company Ltd., Harima
- Laid down: 12 October 1944
- Launched: 26 December 1944
- Sponsored by: Imperial Japanese Navy
- Completed: 7 February 1945
- Commissioned: 7 February 1945
- Stricken: 5 October 1945
- Fate: Scrapped

General characteristics
- Type: Type D escort ship
- Displacement: 740 long tons (752 t) standard
- Length: 69.5 m (228 ft)
- Beam: 8.6 m (28 ft 3 in)
- Draught: 3.05 m (10 ft)
- Propulsion: 1 shaft, geared turbine engines, 2,500 hp (1,864 kW)
- Speed: 17.5 knots (20.1 mph; 32.4 km/h)
- Range: 4,500 nmi (8,300 km) at 16 kn (18 mph; 30 km/h)
- Complement: 160
- Sensors & processing systems: Type 22-Go radar; Type 93 sonar; Type 3 hydrophone
- Armament: As built : 2 × 120 mm (4.7 in)/45 cal DP guns; 6 × Type 96 25 mm (0.98 in) AA machine guns (2×3); 12 × Type 3 depth charge throwers; 1 × depth charge chute; 120 × depth charges; 1 × 81 mm (3.2 in) mortar

CD-154 or No. 154 was a Type D escort ship of the Imperial Japanese Navy during World War II.

== History ==
She was laid down on 12 October 1944 at the Harima shipyard of Harima Shipyard Company Ltd. for the benefit of the Imperial Japanese Navy and launched on 26 December 1944. On 7 February 1945, she was completed and commission and attached to the Kure Naval District. On 3 March 1945, she was assigned to the First Escort Fleet. On 10 April 1945, she was assigned to the Seventh Fleet. On 30 June 1945, she hit a mine and was damaged off Hesaki Lighthouse. She survived the war and on 5 October 1945, she was struck from the Navy List. She served as a minesweeper after the war until 10 September 1947 when she was ceded to Great Britain. She was later scrapped.
