= Japanese escort ship CD-104 =

Type D escort ship

History

Empire of Japan
- Name: CD-104
- Builder: Mitsubishi Heavy Industries, Nagasaki
- Laid down: 1 September 1944
- Launched: 16 December 1944
- Sponsored by: Imperial Japanese Navy
- Completed: 31 January 1945
- Commissioned: 31 January 1945
- Out of service: surrender of Japan, 2 September 1945
- Stricken: 30 November 1945
- Fate: ceded to the Republic of China, 29 August 1947

History

Republic of China Navy
- Acquired: 29 August 1947
- Renamed: Tai An
- Stricken: 1963

General characteristics
- Type: Type D escort ship
- Displacement: 740 long tons (752 t) standard
- Length: 69.5 m (228 ft)
- Beam: 8.6 m (28 ft 3 in)
- Draught: 3.05 m (10 ft)
- Propulsion: 1 shaft, geared turbine engines, 2,500 hp (1,864 kW)
- Speed: 17.5 knots (20.1 mph; 32.4 km/h)
- Range: 4,500 nmi (8,300 km) at 16 kn (18 mph; 30 km/h)
- Complement: 160
- Sensors & processing systems: Type 22-Go radar; Type 93 sonar; Type 3 hydrophone
- Armament: As built : 2 × 120 mm (4.7 in)/45 cal DP guns; 6 × Type 96 25 mm (0.98 in) AA machine guns (2×3); 12 × Type 3 depth charge throwers; 1 × depth charge chute; 120 × depth charges; 1 × 81 mm (3.2 in) mortar

CD-104 or No. 104 was a Type D escort ship of the Imperial Japanese Navy during World War II and later the Republic of China Navy.

== History ==
She was laid down on 1 September 1944 at the Nagasaki shipyard of Mitsubishi Heavy Industries for the benefit of the Imperial Japanese Navy and launched on 16 December 1944. On 31 January 1945, she was completed and commissioned. On 15 March 1945, she was assigned to the First Escort Fleet and then reassigned on 10 April 1945 to the Seventh Fleet. On 15 August 1945, Japan announced their unconditional surrender. On 30 November 1945, she was struck from the Navy List. On 1 December 1945, she was assigned to the Allied Occupation Force where she served as a minesweeper.

On 29 August 1947, she was ceded to the Republic of China as a war reparation and renamed Tai An (泰安).

== Bibliography ==
- Dodson, Aidan & Cant, Serena (2020). Spoils of War: The Fate of Enemy Fleets after Two World Wars. Seaforth Publishing. ISBN 978-1-5267-4198-1.
