= Japanese escort ship CD-186 =

History

Empire of Japan
- Name: CD-186
- Builder: Mitsubishi Heavy Industries, Nagasaki
- Laid down: 11 April 1944
- Launched: 30 December 1944
- Sponsored by: Imperial Japanese Navy
- Completed: 15 February 1945
- Commissioned: 15 February 1945
- Stricken: 25 May 1945
- Fate: Sunk by aircraft, 2 April 1945

General characteristics
- Type: Type D escort ship
- Displacement: 740 long tons (752 t) standard
- Length: 69.5 m (228 ft)
- Beam: 8.6 m (28 ft 3 in)
- Draught: 3.05 m (10 ft)
- Propulsion: 1 shaft, geared turbine engines, 2,500 hp (1,864 kW)
- Speed: 17.5 knots (20.1 mph; 32.4 km/h)
- Range: 4,500 nmi (8,300 km) at 16 kn (18 mph; 30 km/h)
- Complement: 160
- Sensors & processing systems: Type 22-Go radar; Type 93 sonar; Type 3 hydrophone
- Armament: As built : 2 × 120 mm (4.7 in)/45 cal DP guns; 6 × Type 96 25 mm (0.98 in) AA machine guns (2×3); 12 × Type 3 depth charge throwers; 1 × depth charge chute; 120 × depth charges; 1 × 81 mm (3.2 in) mortar

CD-186 or No. 186 was a Type D escort ship of the Imperial Japanese Navy during World War II.

== History ==
She was laid down on 11 April 1944 at the Nagasaki shipyard of Mitsubishi Heavy Industries for the benefit of the Imperial Japanese Navy and launched on 30 December 1944. On 15 February 1945, she was completed and commissioned. On 2 April 1945, while escorting a convoy composed of No.28-class submarine chaser CH-49, No.1-class landing ship T-17, and No.103-class landing ships T-145 and T-146, she was attacked and sunk by planes from Rear Admiral Arthur W. Radford's Task Group 58.4 near Amami Ōshima at coordinates 28°07′N 129°09′E. T-17 and T-145 were also sunk while CH-49 and T-146 were damaged.

On 25 May 1945, she was struck from the Navy List.
