= Japanese escort ship CD-160 =

Japanese imperial navy ship

History

Empire of Japan
- Name: CD-160
- Builder: Harima Shipyard Company Ltd., Harima
- Laid down: 27 January 1945
- Launched: 10 April 1945
- Sponsored by: Imperial Japanese Navy
- Completed: 16 August 1945
- Commissioned: 16 August 1945
- Stricken: 5 October 1945
- Fate: Scrapped, February 1948

General characteristics
- Type: Type D escort ship
- Displacement: 740 long tons (752 t) standard
- Length: 69.5 m (228 ft)
- Beam: 8.6 m (28 ft 3 in)
- Draught: 3.05 m (10 ft)
- Propulsion: 1 shaft, geared turbine engines, 2,500 hp (1,864 kW)
- Speed: 17.5 knots (20.1 mph; 32.4 km/h)
- Range: 4,500 nmi (8,300 km) at 16 kn (18 mph; 30 km/h)
- Complement: 160
- Sensors & processing systems: Type 22-Go radar; Type 93 sonar; Type 3 hydrophone
- Armament: As built : 2 × 120 mm (4.7 in)/45 cal DP guns; 6 × Type 96 25 mm (0.98 in) AA machine guns (2×3); 12 × Type 3 depth charge throwers; 1 × depth charge chute; 120 × depth charges; 1 × 81 mm (3.2 in) mortar

CD-160 or No. 160 was a Type D escort ship of the Imperial Japanese Navy during World War II.

== History ==
She was laid down on 27 January 1945 at the Harima shipyard of Harima Shipyard Company Ltd. for the benefit of the Imperial Japanese Navy and launched on 10 April 1945. On 16 August 1945, she was completed and commissioned, one day after Japan's unconditional surrender on 15 August 1945. On 5 October 1945, she was struck from the Navy List. She served as a repatriation vessel after the war until 9 August 1947 when she was ceded to Great Britain. On 2 February 1948, she was scrapped at Maizuru.
