= Type D escort ship =

Class of escort ships

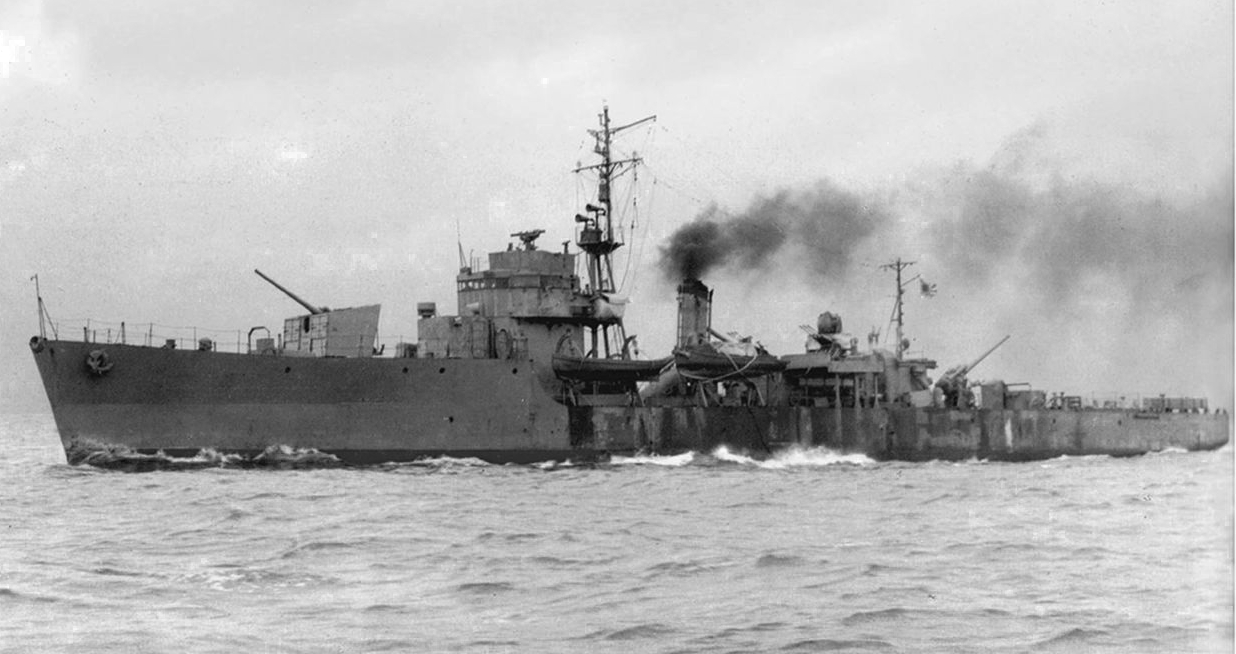
- No.2 on 26 February 1944 at Tokyo Bay

Class overview
- Name: No.2-class escort ship
- Builders: Yokosuka Naval Arsenal; Fujinagata Shipyards; Harima Zōsen Corporation; Hitachi Zōsen Corporation; Ishikawajima Heavy Industries; Kawasaki Shipbuilding Corporation; Mitsubishi Heavy Industries; Tōkyō Ishikawajima Shipyard
- Operators: Imperial Japanese Navy; Republic of China Navy; Soviet Navy; People's Liberation Army Navy
- Preceded by: Ukuru class
- Cost: 5,363,000 JPY
- Built: 1943–1946
- In commission: 1944–1987
- Planned: 200
- Completed: 67
- Canceled: 76
- Lost: 26
- Retired: 41

General characteristics
- Type: Escort ship
- Displacement: 740 long tons (752 t) (standard)
- Length: 69.5 m (228 ft)
- Beam: 8.6 m (28 ft 3 in)
- Draught: 3.05 m (10 ft)
- Installed power: 2 boilers; 2,500 shp (1,864 kW)
- Propulsion: 1 shaft; geared steam turbine
- Speed: 17.5 knots (32.4 km/h; 20.1 mph)
- Range: 4,500 nmi (8,300 km) at 16 knots (30 km/h; 18 mph)
- Complement: 160
- Sensors & processing systems: Type 22-Go radar; Type 93 sonar; Type 3 hydrophone
- Armament: As built : 2 × 120 mm (4.7 in) DP guns; 2 triple × Type 96 25 mm (0.98 in) AA guns; 12 × Type 3 depth charge throwers; 1 × depth charge chute; 120 × depth charges; From 1944 : as above, plus; 1 × 81 mm (3.2 in) mortar

The Type D escort ships (丁型海防艦, Tei-gata kaibōkan) were a class of escort ships in the service of the Imperial Japanese Navy during World War II. The Japanese called them "Type D" coast defence ships, and they were the sixth class of Kaibōkan (Kai = sea, ocean, Bo = defence, Kan = ship), a name used to denote a multi-purpose vessel. 143 ships were ordered under the 1943–44 Programme, and a further 57 units were planned (but never ordered) under the 1944–45 Programme, for an overall total of 200 ships. However, only 67 were completed, with the remainder being cancelled.

== Background ==
The Type D, like the Ukuru and Mikura classes, were dedicated to the anti-aircraft (AA) and anti-submarine role.

On 22 April 1943, the Navy General Staff decided a mass production of escort ships, because of the urgent need to protect the convoys which were under constant attack. The plan was to build a basic escort ship of around 800 tons, with a simple design for easy construction. The first designs, for "Type A" Etorofu class and "Type B" Mikura class, still needed too many man-hours for building, so in June 1943, the Navy General Staff planned for a simplified design. The result was the Ukuru class, and a scaled-down model of the Mikura class, which became the "Type C" (with diesel engines driving twin screws) and "Type D" (with turbine engines driving a single screw) escort classes.

== Design ==
Because of Japan's deteriorating war situation, the Type D version was a further simplification of the Ukuru design and were built to the same design as the Type C escort ship. However, due to a shortage of diesel engines to power both groups of vessels, the Type D were powered by a single steam turbine. This gave a slight increase in speed, from 16.5 knots (30.6 km/h; 19.0 mph) to 17.5 knots (32.4 km/h; 20.1 mph), but a reduction in range and endurance, 4,500 nautical miles (8,300 km; 5,200 mi) at 16 knots (30 km/h; 18 mph) instead of 6,500 nautical miles (12,000 km; 7,500 mi). The Type D was the only Kaibōkan type to use turbines.

They were smaller by 200 tons than the Ukuru's and engines that propelled them were also smaller, at 2,500 shaft horsepower (1,900 kW) versus 4,200 shp (3,100 kW) for the Ukurus. Because of the decrease in engine power, the speed fell from 19.5 knots (36.1 km/h; 22.4 mph) to 17.5 knots (32.4 km/h; 20.1 mph). The number of 4.7 in (119 mm) guns went from three to two. The number of depth charges aboard was the same, 120, but the number of depth charge throwers was decreased from 18 to 12 and the depth charge chutes were decreased from two to one.

== Construction ==
The design work for the Type D ships started in March 1943, at the same time as for the Ukuru class. They were built concurrently with the Ukuru class and Type C vessels. The Type D were given even number designations while the Type C were given odd numbers. The Type D were constructed using prefabricated sections that enabled them to be built in as little as three to four months. The lead ship, No.2 (CD-2) was constructed at Yokosuka Naval Arsenal, laid down on 5 October 1943, launched on 30 December 1943, and completed on 28 February 1944. CD-198 was the fastest build, being constructed in only 71 days; she was laid down on 31 December 1944, and completed on 11 March 1945. CD-204 was the last of the class being laid down on 27 February 1945 at the Nagasaki shipyard of Mitsubishi Heavy Industries, launched on 14 April 1945, and completed on 11 July 1945.

== Service ==
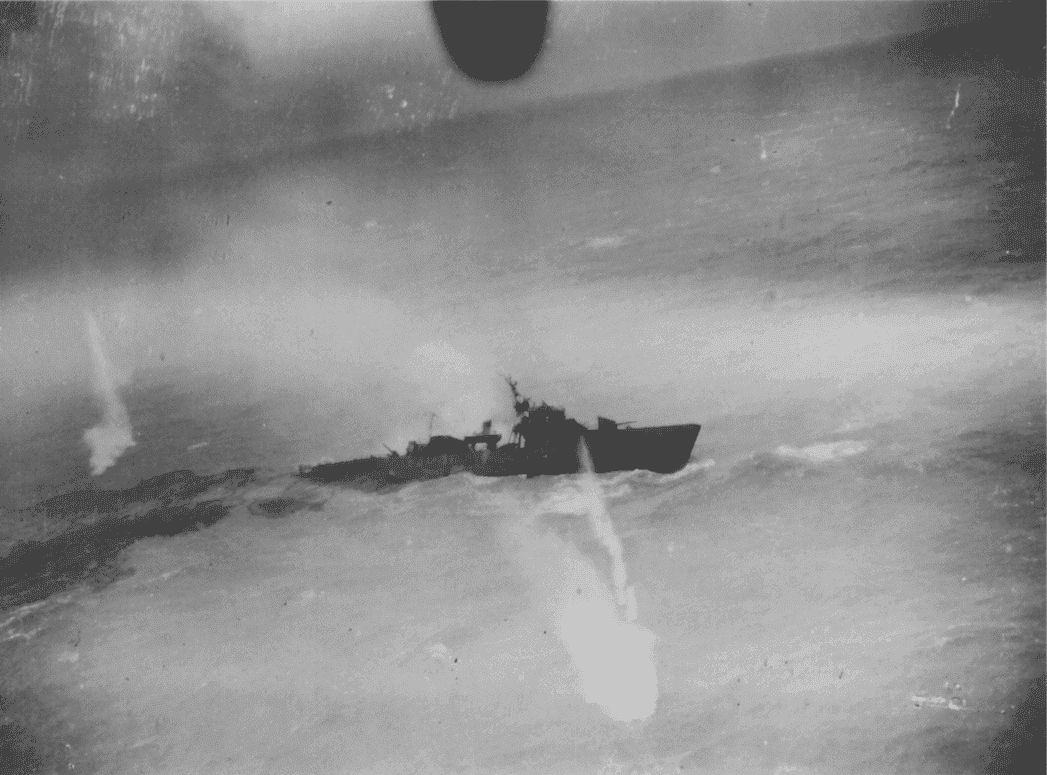
No.134 sinking south of Xiamen after an attack by USAAF aircraft, 6 April 1945

Most of the Type D escorts were assigned to the Escort Fleet. However, they were not able to stop the American submarine offensive. One drawback was they did not have an effective fire-control system. They were equipped only with one height rangefinder for the AA guns and were powerless against an air attack. Despite being simple to construct they proved themselves very durable for their size. Of the 22 instances of torpedoes striking them, they survived 9 times, with CD-30 being struck and surviving on two separate occasions. Of the seven occasions when they struck mines, only one sank. During the war 68 ships were finished out of the 200 planned; 25 were sunk during the war.

== Successes ==
- USS Harder was sunk on 24 August 1944 by CD-22.
- USS Scamp was probably sunk on 11 November 1944 by CD-4.
- USS Swordfish may also have been sunk by CD-4 on 4 January 1945, though evidence is unclear.
- USS Snook was probably sunk by CD-8, CD-32, and CD-52 with Okinawa on 9 April 1945.
- USS Bonefish was sunk on 19 June 1945 by CD-158 with CD-63, CD-75 and CD-207 and Okinawa.
- USS Salmon was rendered unfit for further service by damage from CD-22 with CD-33 and CD-29 on 30 October 1944.
- USS Halibut was rendered unfit for further service by damage from CD-6 on 14 November 1944.
- USS Escolar was probably sunk by CD-38 which reported having contact with and sinking a US Navy submarine on 19 October 1944 near Escolar's expected position. Escolar was never heard from again.

== Ships in class ==
Under the Wartime Naval Armaments Supplement Programme, it was proposed to build 300 Type C and 200 Type D escorts. These were assigned the Programme numbers #2401-#2700 for the Type C vessels, with #2701-#2900 for the Type D vessels. In view of the vast number intended, no names were allocated, but only numbers; odd numbers from No.1 upwards were assigned to Type C escorts, while even numbers from No.2 upwards were assigned to Type D escorts.

The first 143 of the Type D escorts were authorised under the 1943 Fiscal Year, but just 66 were completed and the others cancelled. The remaining 57 Type D vessels were intended to be built under the 1944 Fiscal Year, but no contracts were ever issued.

Ship #	Ship	Builder	Laid down	Launched	Completed	Fate
#2701	No.2 (第2号海防艦,, Dai 2 Gō Kaibōkan) the same shall apply hereinafter	Yokosuka Naval Arsenal	5 October 1943	30 December 1943	28 February 1944	Decommissioned on 20 September 1945. Scrapped on 20 July 1948.
#2702	No.4	Yokosuka Naval Arsenal	5 October 1943	30 December 1943	7 March 1944	Sunk by Royal Navy aircraft at Toba, 28 July 1945. Salvaged and scrapped on 30 June 1948.
#2703	No.6	Yokosuka Naval Arsenal	5 October 1943	15 January 1944	15 March 1944	Sunk by USS Atule at south of Hidaka, 13 August 1945.
#2704	No.8	Mitsubishi, Nagasaki Shipyard	20 October 1943	11 January 1944	29 February 1944	Decommissioned on 5 October 1945. Surrendered to United Kingdom, 16 July 1947. Later scrapped.
#2705	No.10	Mitsubishi, Nagasaki Shipyard	20 October 1943	11 January 1944	29 February 1944	Sunk by USS Plaice at west of Tokara Islands, 27 September 1944.
#2706	No.12	Yokosuka Naval Arsenal	5 October 1943	15 January 1944	22 March 1944	Decommissioned on 30 November 1945. Surrendered to United States, 5 September 1947. Scrapped on 30 November 1947.
#2707	No.14	Yokosuka Naval Arsenal	5 October 1943	25 January 1944	27 March 1944	Decommissioned on 30 November 1945. Surrendered to Republic of China 6 July 1947, and renamed Tsinan. Captured by People's Liberation Army 1949, and renamed Wuchang (215). Decommissioned in 1982.
#2708	No.16	Yokosuka Naval Arsenal	5 October 1943	25 January 1944	31 March 1944	Decommissioned on 30 November 1945. Surrendered to United Kingdom, 14 August 1947. Later scrapped.
#2709	No.18	Mitsubishi, Nagasaki Shipyard	1 November 1943	11 January 1944	8 March 1944	Sunk by USAAF aircraft to east of Quảng Ngãi, 29 March 1945.
#2710	No.20	Mitsubishi, Nagasaki Shipyard	1 November 1943	11 January 1944	11 March 1944	Heavy damaged by USAAF aircraft to northwest of San Fernando, 29 December 1944. Sunk on 30 December 1944.
#2711	No.22	Mitsubishi, Nagasaki Shipyard	1 November 1943	27 January 1944	24 March 1944	Decommissioned on 30 November 1945. Surrendered to United States, 5 September 1947. Scrapped on 31 December 1947.
#2712	No.24	Mitsubishi, Nagasaki Shipyard	1 November 1943	27 January 1944	28 March 1944	Sunk by USS Archerfish at west of Iwo Jima, 28 June 1944.
#2713	No.26	Mitsubishi, Nagasaki Shipyard	1 February 1944	11 April 1944	31 May 1944	Decommissioned on 30 November 1945. Surrendered to United States, 6 September 1947. Scrapped on 13 October 1947.
#2714	No.28	Mitsubishi, Nagasaki Shipyard	1 February 1944	11 April 1944	31 May 1944	Sunk by USS Blenny at Dasol Bay, 24 December 1944.
#2715	No.30	Mitsubishi, Nagasaki Shipyard	15 February 1944	10 May 1944	26 June 1944	Sunk by British P-51s from the 15th Fighter Squadron at Yura, 28 July 1945. Salvaged and scrapped 1948.
#2716	No.32	Mitsubishi, Nagasaki Shipyard	15 March 1944	10 May 1944	30 June 1944	Decommissioned on 5 October 1945. Surrendered to United Kingdom, 16 July 1947. Later scrapped.
#2717	No.34	Tōkyō Ishikawajima Shipyard	25 March 1944	6 July 1944	25 August 1944	Decommissioned on 5 October 1945. Surrendered to Soviet Union, 5 July 1947. Served in Soviet Pacific Ocean Fleet as patrol ship EK-32 (1947), target ship TsL-63 (1954), repair ship PM-75 (1957). Decommissioned on 23 July 1958 and scrapped.
#2718	No.36	Fujinagata Shipyards	20 March 1944	16 September 1944	21 October 1944	Decommissioned on 5 October 1945. Surrendered to United States, 19 July 1947. Scrapped on 3 January 1948.
#2719	No.38	Kawasaki, Kōbe Shipyard	2 April 1944	15 June 1944	10 August 1944	Sunk by USS Hardhead at west of Corregidor, 25 November 1944.
#2720	No.40	Fujinagata Shipyards	20 March 1944	15 November 1944	22 December 1944	Decommissioned on 30 November 1945. Surrendered to Republic of China 29 August 1947, and renamed Chenan (PF-72). Decommissioned 1963.
#2721	No.42	Mitsubishi, Nagasaki Shipyard	15 April 1944	7 July 1944	25 August 1944	Sunk by USS Puffer to northwest of Agunijima Island, 10 January 1945.
#2722	No.44	Mitsubishi, Nagasaki Shipyard	15 April 1944	7 July 1944	31 August 1944	Decommissioned on 5 October 1945. Surrendered to United States, 5 July 1947. Sunk as target at 34°48′N 139°42′E, 25 August 1947.
#2723	No.46	Kawasaki, Kōbe Shipyard	1 May 1944	30 June 1944	29 August 1944	Sunk by naval mine at Mokpo, 17 August 1945.
#2724	No.48	Fujinagata Shipyards	15 May 1944	18 January 1945	13 March 1945	Decommissioned on 30 November 1945. Surrendered to Soviet Union, 28 August 1947. Served in Soviet Pacific Ocean Fleet as patrol ship EK-42 (1947), target ship TsL-42 (1948), dispatch ship Abakan (1949). Decommissioned on 2 June 1959 and scrapped.
#2725	No.50	Tōkyō Ishikawajima Shipyard	8 July 1944	9 September 1944	13 October 1944	Decommissioned on 20 November 1945. Scrapped on 5 May 1948.
#2726	No.52	Mitsubishi, Nagasaki Shipyard	15 May 1944	7 August 1944	25 September 1944	Decommissioned on 5 October 1945. Surrendered to Soviet Union, 29 July 1947. Served in Soviet Pacific Ocean Fleet as patrol ship EK-36 (1947), tdispatch ship Naryn (1954). Decommissioned on 11 March 1958 and scrapped.
#2727	No.54	Mitsubishi, Nagasaki Shipyard	15 May 1944	7 August 1944	30 September 1944	Heavy damaged by USN aircraft at Calayan, 15 December 1944. Later scuttled.
#2728	No.56	Kawasaki, Kōbe Shipyard	1 June 1944	30 July 1944	27 September 1944	Sunk by USS Bowfin to south of Tateyama, 17 February 1945.
#2729	No.58	Fujinagata Shipyards	1945	15 April 1945	8 April 1946	Surrendered incomplete, completed post-war for repatriation duties; handed over to United States 31 July 1947. Scrapped at Sasebo on 30 November 1947.
#2730	No.60	Kawasaki, Kōbe Shipyard	16 June 1944	15 September 1944	9 November 1944	Decommissioned on 5 October 1945. Surrendered to United Kingdom, 14 August 1947. Later scrapped.
#2731	No.62	Hitachi Zōsen, Mukōjima Shipyard				Construction stopped on 22 May 1945. Sunk at Kure, 14 January 1946. Salvaged and scrapped, May 1948.
#2732	No.64	Mitsubishi, Nagasaki Shipyard	8 July 1944	5 September 1944	15 October 1944	Sunk by USS Pipefish at east of Hainan Island, 3 December 1944.
#2733	No.66	Mitsubishi, Nagasaki Shipyard	8 July 1944	5 September 1944	21 October 1944	Sunk by USN aircraft off Shantou, 13 March 1945.
#2734	No.68	Kawasaki, Kōbe Shipyard	3 July 1944	30 September 1944	20 November 1944	Sunk by USN aircraft to west of Amami Ōshima, 24 March 1945.
#2735	No.70	Hitachi Zōsen, Mukōjima Shipyard	1945			Construction stopped on 1 April 1945. Later scrapped.
#2736	No.72	Tōkyō Ishikawajima Shipyard	18 August 1944	23 October 1944	25 November 1944	Sunk by USS Haddo at west of Taedong River, 1 July 1945.
#2737	No.74	Mitsubishi, Nagasaki Shipyard	1 August 1944	2 November 1944	10 December 1944	Sunk by USN aircraft at Muroran, 14 July 1945.
#2738	No.76	Mitsubishi, Nagasaki Shipyard	1 August 1944	18 November 1944	23 December 1944	Decommissioned on 30 November 1945. Surrendered to Soviet Union, 28 August 1947. Served in Soviet Pacific Ocean Fleet as patrol ship EK-44 (1947), target ship TsL-44 (1948), patrol ship SKR-49 (1954). Refitted, rearmed and ceded to Chinese People's Liberation Army on 25 June 1955.
#2739	No.78	Kawasaki, Senshū Shipyard		1945	4 April 1946	Surrendered to Soviet Union, 29 July 1947. Served in Soviet Pacific Ocean Fleet as patrol ship EK-37 (1947), dispatch ship Murgab (1954). Decommissioned on 11 March 1958 and scrapped.
#2740	No.80	Hitachi Zōsen, Mukōjima Shipyard	1945			Construction stopped on 1 April 1945. Later scrapped.
#2741	No.82	Mitsubishi, Nagasaki Shipyard	6 September 1944	18 November 1944	31 December 1944	Sunk by Russian aircraft to ENE of Kimchaek, 10 August 1945.
#2742	No.84	Mitsubishi, Nagasaki Shipyard	6 September 1944	18 November 1944	31 December 1944	Sunk by USS Hammerhead at ENE of French Indochina, 29 March 1945.
#2743 to #2750	Even numbers from No.86 to No.100					Cancelled in August 1944.
#2751	No.102	Mitsubishi, Nagasaki Shipyard	1 September 1944	4 December 1944	20 January 1945	Decommissioned on 30 November 1945. Surrendered to Soviet Union, 28 August 1947. Served in Soviet Pacific Ocean Fleet as patrol ship EK-46 (1947), target ship TsL-46 (1948). Decommissioned on 21 January 1960 and scrapped.
#2752	No.104	Mitsubishi, Nagasaki Shipyard	1 September 1944	16 December 1944	31 January 1945	Decommissioned on 30 November 1945. Surrendered to Republic of China 29 August 1947, and renamed Taian (PF-71). Decommissioned 1963.
#2753	No.106	Tōkyō Ishikawajima Shipyard	18 September 1944	7 December 1944	14 January 1945	Decommissioned on 5 October 1945. Surrendered to United States, 5 July 1947. Sunk as target at 34°45′N 139°44′E, 21 July 1947.
#2754 #2755	No.108; No.110		-	-	-	Cancelled in Spring 1944.
#2756	No.112	Kawasaki, Senshū Shipyard	10 May 1944	5 September 1944	24 October 1944	Sunk by USS Barb at northeast of Cape Crillon, 18 July 1945.
#2757	No.114					Cancelled in Spring 1944.
#2758	No.116	Ishikawajima Heavy Industries		1945	28 November 1945	Decommissioned 25 March 1946. Later scrapped.
#2759	No.118	Kawasaki, Kōbe Shipyard	8 June 1944	20 November 1944	27 December 1944	Decommissioned on 5 October 1945. Surrendered to Republic of China 31 July 1947. Captured by People's Liberation Army, May 1949, and renamed Changsha (216). Decommissioned in 1982.
#2760	No.120					Cancelled in Spring 1944.
#2761	No.122	Tōkyō Ishikawajima Shipyard				Construction stopped in March 1945. Later scrapped.
#2762	No.124	Kawasaki, Senshū Shipyard	29 June 1944	12 January 1945	9 February 1945	Decommissioned on 30 November 1945. Scrapped on 1 February 1948.
#2763	No.126	Kawasaki, Senshū Shipyard	7 November 1944	25 February 1945	26 March 1945	Decommissioned on 5 November 1945. Surrendered to United Kingdom, 14 August 1947. Later scrapped.
#2764	No.128					Cancelled in Spring 1944.
#2765	No.130	Harima Zōsen	22 February 1944	24 May 1944	12 August 1944	Sunk by USAAF aircraft at east of Quảng Ngãi, 29 March 1945.
#2766	No.132	Harima Zōsen	10 April 1944	25 June 1944	7 September 1944	Decommissioned on 5 October 1945. Scrapped on 2 July 1948.
#2767	No.134	Harima Zōsen	26 May 1944	29 July 1944	30 September 1944	Sunk by USAAF aircraft to south of Xiamen, 6 April 1945.
#2768	No.136					Cancelled in Autumn 1944.
#2769	No.138	Harima Zōsen	27 June 1944	1 September 1944	23 October 1944	Sunk by aircraft at San Fernando, 2 January 1945.
#2770	No.140					Cancelled in Autumn 1944.
#2771	No.142	Kawasaki, Senshū Shipyard		1945	7 April 1946	Surrendered to Soviet Union, 29 July 1947. Served in Soviet Pacific Ocean Fleet as patrol ship EK-38 (1947), target ship TsL-38 (1948), dispatch ship Arkhara (1949), patrol ship SKR-48 (1954). Refitted, rearmed and ceded to Chinese People's Liberation Army on 11 February 1955. Under the name Chih-17 served until 1987.
#2772	No.144	Harima Zōsen	1 August 1944	10 October 1944	23 November 1944	Sunk by USS Besugo at east of Malay Peninsula, 2 February 1945.
#2773 #2774	No.146; No.148					Cancelled in Autumn 1944.
#2775	No.150	Harima Zōsen	4 September 1944	15 November 1944	24 December 1944	Decommissioned on 5 October 1945. Surrendered to United States, 4 July 1947. Sunk as target at 35°28′N 123°25′E, 18 August 1947.
#2776	No.152					Cancelled in Autumn 1944.
#2777	No.154	Harima Zōsen	12 October 1944	26 December 1944	7 February 1945	Decommissioned on 30 November 1945. Surrendered to United Kingdom, 4 September 1947. Scrapped on 1 March 1948.
#2778	No.156	Harima Zōsen	17 November 1944	25 January 1945	8 March 1945	Decommissioned on 30 November 1945. Surrendered to United Kingdom, 4 September 1947. Scrapped on 11 December 1947.
#2779	No.158	Harima Zōsen	28 December 1944	25 February 1945	13 April 1945	Decommissioned on 5 October 1945. Surrendered to United States, 25 July 1947. Scrapped on 31 December 1947.
#2780	No.160	Harima Zōsen	27 January 1945	10 April 1945	16 August 1945	Decommissioned on 5 October 1945. Surrendered to United Kingdom, 8 September 1947. Scrapped on 21 February 1948.
#2781 to #2792	Even numbers from No.162 to No.184					Cancelled in Autumn 1944.
#2793	No.186	Mitsubishi, Nagasaki Shipyard	4 November 1944	30 December 1944	15 February 1945	Sunk by USN aircraft at Amami Ōshima, 2 April 1945.
#2794	No.188					Cancelled in Autumn 1944.
#2795	No.190	Mitsubishi, Nagasaki Shipyard	20 November 1944	16 January 1945	21 February 1945	Decommissioned on 30 November 1945. Scrapped on 31 March 1948.
#2796	No.192	Mitsubishi, Nagasaki Shipyard	5 December 1944	30 January 1945	28 February 1945	Decommissioned on 25 October 1945. Surrendered to Republic of China 31 July 1947, and renamed Tsuan. Decommissioned 1952.
#2797	No.194	Mitsubishi, Nagasaki Shipyard	18 December 1944	15 February 1945	15 March 1945	Decommissioned on 5 October 1945. Surrendered to Republic of China 6 July 1947, and renamed Weihai. Captured by People's Liberation Army, 23 April 1949, and renamed Tsinan (219). Decommissioned 1982.
#2798	No.196	Mitsubishi, Nagasaki Shipyard	31 December 1944	26 February 1945	31 March 1945	Decommissioned on 30 November 1945. Surrendered to Soviet Union, 5 July 1947. Served in Soviet Pacific Ocean Fleet as patrol ship EK-33 (1947), dispatch ship Turgai (1954). Decommissioned on 11 March 1958 and scrapped.
#2799	No.198	Mitsubishi, Nagasaki Shipyard	17 January 1945	26 February 1945	31 March 1945	Decommissioned on 5 October 1945. Surrendered to Republic of China 31 July 1947. Captured by People's Liberation Army, May 1949, and renamed Sian (220). Decommissioned 1982.
#2800	No.200	Mitsubishi, Nagasaki Shipyard	31 January 1945	19 March 1945	20 April 1945	Decommissioned on 30 November 1945. Scrapped on 1 July 1948.
#2801	No.202	Mitsubishi, Nagasaki Shipyard	16 February 1945	2 April 1945	7 July 1945	Decommissioned on 30 November 1945. Scrapped on 1 January 1948.
#2802	No.204	Mitsubishi, Nagasaki Shipyard	27 February 1945	14 April 1945	11 July 1945	Decommissioned on 20 November 1945. Scrapped on 31 January 1948.
#2803 to #2843	Even numbers from No.206 to No.286					Cancelled in Autumn 1944.
57 ships	Even numbers from No.288 onwards	-	-	-	-	Projected only, never ordered

== See also ==
- Hiburi-class escort ship
- Shimushu-class escort ship
- Type C escort ship
- Destroyer escort
- Tacoma-class frigate
- Flower-class corvette
- PCE-842-class patrol craft
