= Japanese escort ship CD-200 =

History

Empire of Japan
- Name: CD-200
- Builder: Mitsubishi Heavy Industries, Nagasaki
- Laid down: 31 January 1945
- Launched: 19 March 1945
- Sponsored by: Imperial Japanese Navy
- Completed: 20 April 1945
- Commissioned: 20 April 1945
- Out of service: surrender of Japan, 2 September 1945
- Stricken: 30 November 1945
- Fate: Scrapped, 1 July 1948

General characteristics
- Type: Type D escort ship
- Displacement: 740 long tons (752 t) standard
- Length: 69.5 m (228 ft)
- Beam: 8.6 m (28 ft 3 in)
- Draught: 3.05 m (10 ft)
- Propulsion: 1 shaft, geared turbine engines, 2,500 hp (1,864 kW)
- Speed: 17.5 knots (20.1 mph; 32.4 km/h)
- Range: 4,500 nmi (8,300 km) at 16 kn (18 mph; 30 km/h)
- Complement: 160
- Sensors & processing systems: Type 22-Go radar; Type 93 sonar; Type 3 hydrophone
- Armament: As built : 2 × 120 mm (4.7 in)/45 cal DP guns; 6 × Type 96 25 mm (0.98 in) AA machine guns (2×3); 12 × Type 3 depth charge throwers; 1 × depth charge chute; 120 × depth charges; 1 × 81 mm (3.2 in) mortar

CD-200 or No. 200 was a Type D escort ship of the Imperial Japanese Navy during World War II.

== History ==
She was laid down on 31 January 1945 at the Nagasaki shipyard of Mitsubishi Heavy Industries for the benefit of the Imperial Japanese Navy and launched on 19 March 1945. On 20 April 1945, she was completed and commissioned. On 17 May 1945, she struck a mine outside Miyazu Bay. On 15 August 1945, Japan announced their unconditional surrender and she was turned over to the Allies in September 1945. On 30 November 1945, she was struck from the Navy List and scrapped on 1 July 1948.
