= Japanese escort ship CD-196 =

History

Imperial Japanese Navy
- Name: CD-196
- Builder: Mitsubishi Heavy Industries, Nagasaki
- Laid down: 31 December 1944
- Launched: 26 February 1945
- Sponsored by: Imperial Japanese Navy
- Completed: 31 March 1945
- Commissioned: 31 March 1945
- Out of service: surrender of Japan, 2 September 1945
- Stricken: 30 November 1945
- Fate: ceded to the Soviet Union, 28 August 1947

History

Soviet Navy
- Name: EK-33
- Acquired: 28 August 1947
- Renamed: Turgay (1954)
- Fate: Scrapped, 11 March 1958

General characteristics
- Type: Type D escort ship
- Displacement: 740 long tons (752 t) standard
- Length: 69.5 m (228 ft)
- Beam: 8.6 m (28 ft 3 in)
- Draught: 3.05 m (10 ft)
- Propulsion: 1 shaft, geared turbine engines, 2,500 hp (1,864 kW)
- Speed: 17.5 knots (20.1 mph; 32.4 km/h)
- Range: 4,500 nmi (8,300 km) at 16 kn (18 mph; 30 km/h)
- Complement: 160
- Sensors & processing systems: Type 22-Go radar; Type 93 sonar; Type 3 hydrophone
- Armament: As built : 2 × 120 mm (4.7 in)/45 cal DP guns; 6 × Type 96 25 mm (0.98 in) AA machine guns (2×3); 12 × Type 3 depth charge throwers; 1 × depth charge chute; 120 × depth charges; 1 × 81 mm (3.2 in) mortar

CD-196 or No. 196 was a Type D escort ship of the Imperial Japanese Navy during World War II.

== History ==
She was laid down on 31 December 1944 at the Nagasaki shipyard of Mitsubishi Heavy Industries for the benefit of the Imperial Japanese Navy and launched on 26 February 1945. On 31 March 1945, she was completed and commissioned. On 22 June 1945, she was damaged by two torpedoes fired by the USS Piranha at 39°31′N 142°39′E which destroyed her rudder and killed two crewmen. On 23 June 1945, she arrived at Yamada Bay where she underwent repair. On 15 August 1945, Japan announced their unconditional surrender and she was surrendered to Allied forces. On 30 November 1945, she was struck from the Navy List.

On 1 December 1945, she was assigned to the Allied Repatriation Service and completed a number of repatriation trips before being ceded to Soviet Union as a war reparation on 28 August 1947. She served as patrol boat EK-33 (ЭК-33) in the Soviet Pacific Ocean Fleet. In 1954, she was re-designated as a dispatch ship and renamed Turgay (Тургай). On 11 March 1958, she was decommissioned and scrapped soon after.

== Bibliography ==
- Dodson, Aidan & Cant, Serena (2020). Spoils of War: The Fate of Enemy Fleets after Two World Wars. Seaforth Publishing. ISBN 978-1-5267-4198-1.
