= Japanese escort ship CD-142 =

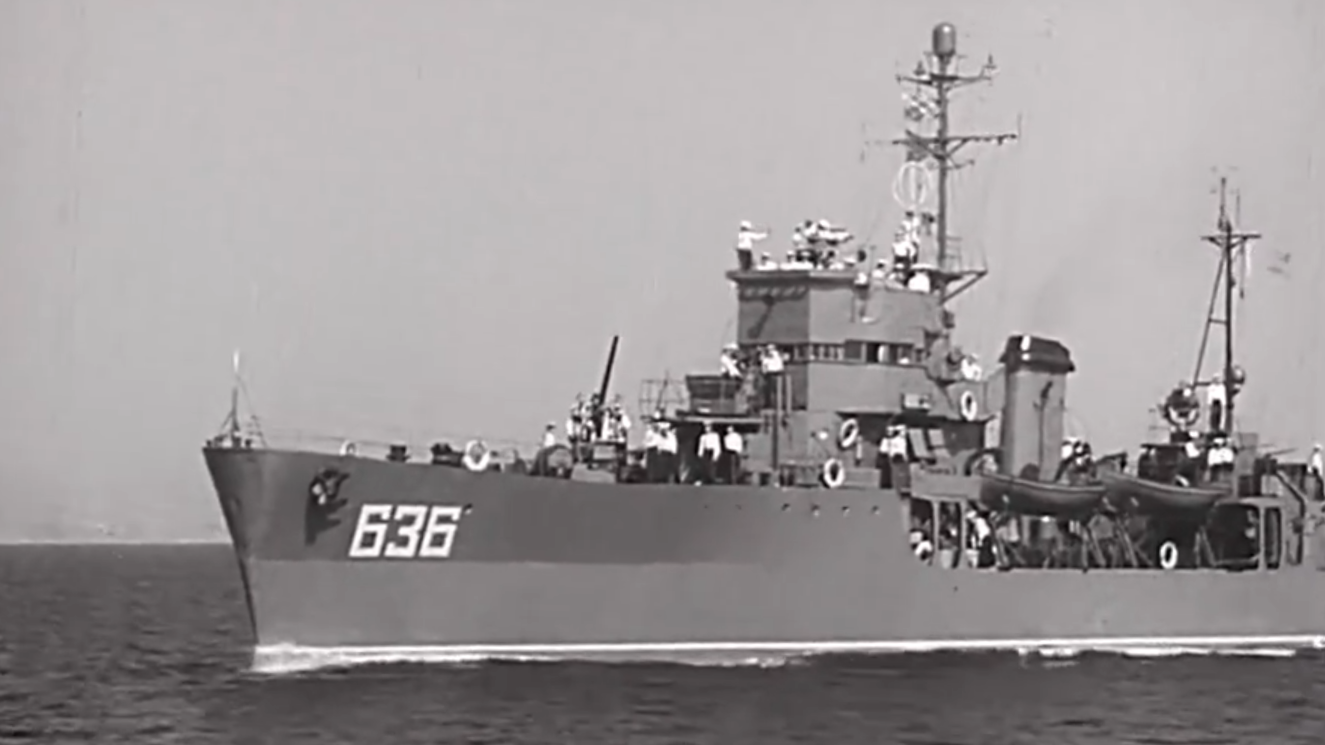
- CD-142 in PLAN service c. 1958

History

Imperial Japanese Navy
- Name: CD-142
- Builder: Kawasaki Ship Building Company, Ltd., Senshu
- Laid down: 1944
- Launched: 8 May 1945
- Sponsored by: Imperial Japanese Navy
- Completed: 7 April 1946
- Fate: ceded to the Soviet Union, 28 August 1947

History

Soviet Navy
- Name: EK-38
- Acquired: 28 August 1947
- Renamed: Arkhara (1949); СКР-48 (1954)
- Home port: Vladivostok
- Fate: transferred to Peoples Liberation Army Navy, February 1955

History

People's Liberation Army Navy
- Acquired: February 1955
- Decommissioned: 1987
- Renamed: Chih-17
- Fate: unknown

General characteristics
- Type: Type D escort ship
- Displacement: 740 long tons (752 t) standard
- Length: 69.5 m (228 ft)
- Beam: 8.6 m (28 ft 3 in)
- Draught: 3.05 m (10 ft)
- Propulsion: 1 shaft, geared turbine engines, 2,500 hp (1,864 kW)
- Speed: 17.5 knots (20.1 mph; 32.4 km/h)
- Range: 4,500 nmi (8,300 km) at 16 kn (18 mph; 30 km/h)
- Complement: 160
- Sensors & processing systems: Type 22-Go radar; Type 93 sonar; Type 3 hydrophone
- Armament: As built : 2 × 120 mm (4.7 in)/45 cal DP guns; 6 × Type 96 25 mm (0.98 in) AA machine guns (2×3); 12 × Type 3 depth charge throwers; 1 × depth charge chute; 120 × depth charges; 1 × 81 mm (3.2 in) mortar

CD-142 or No. 142 was a Type D escort ship of the Imperial Japanese Navy during World War II.

== History ==
She was laid down in 1944 at the Senshu shipyard of Kawasaki Ship Building Company, Ltd. for the benefit of the Imperial Japanese Navy and launched on 8 May 1945. Although Japan announced their unconditional surrender on 15 August 1945, work continued on her and she was completed on 7 April 1946. She was assigned to the Allied Repatriation Service and completed a number of repatriation trips before being ceded to the Soviet Union as a war reparation on 28 August 1947.

She served as target ship EK-38 (ЭК-38) in the Soviet Pacific Ocean Fleet. In June 1949, she was re-designated as a dispatch ship and renamed Arkhara (Архара). In November 1954, she was re-designated a patrol boat and renamed СКР-48 (SKR-48). In February 1955, she was transferred to the Peoples Liberation Army Navy, under the name Chih-17 where she served until 1987.

== Bibliography ==
- Dodson, Aidan & Cant, Serena (2020). Spoils of War: The Fate of Enemy Fleets after Two World Wars. Seaforth Publishing. ISBN 978-1-5267-4198-1.
