= Japanese escort ship CD-40 =

Type D escort service

History

Imperial Japanese Navy
- Name: CD-40
- Builder: Fujinagata Shipbuilding, Osaka
- Laid down: 20 March 1944
- Launched: 15 November 1944
- Sponsored by: Imperial Japanese Navy
- Completed: 22 December 1944
- Commissioned: 22 December 1944
- Out of service: surrender of Japan, 2 September 1945
- Stricken: 30 November 1945
- Fate: ceded to the Republic of China, 29 August 1947

History

Republic of China Navy
- Acquired: 29 August 1947
- Renamed: Cheng An / Chan An
- Stricken: 1963

General characteristics
- Type: Type D escort ship
- Displacement: 740 long tons (752 t) standard
- Length: 69.5 m (228 ft)
- Beam: 8.6 m (28 ft 3 in)
- Draught: 3.05 m (10 ft)
- Propulsion: 1 shaft, geared turbine engines, 2,500 hp (1,864 kW)
- Speed: 17.5 knots (20.1 mph; 32.4 km/h)
- Range: 4,500 nmi (8,300 km) at 16 kn (18 mph; 30 km/h)
- Complement: 160
- Sensors & processing systems: Type 22-Go radar; Type 93 sonar; Type 3 hydrophone
- Armament: As built : 2 × 120 mm (4.7 in)/45 cal DP guns; 6 × Type 96 25 mm (0.98 in) AA machine guns (2×3); 12 × Type 3 depth charge throwers; 1 × depth charge chute; 120 × depth charges; 1 × 81 mm (3.2 in) mortar

CD-40 or No. 40 was a Type D escort ship of the Imperial Japanese Navy during World War II and later the Republic of China Navy.

== History ==
She was laid down on 20 March 1944 at the Osaka shipyard of Fujinagata Shipbuilding for the benefit of the Imperial Japanese Navy and launched on 15 November 1944. On 22 December 1944, she was completed and commissioned. On 1 February 1945, she was assigned to the First Escort Fleet and then reassigned on 10 July 1945 to the 105th Escort Squadron. On 15 August 1945, Japan announced their unconditional surrender. On 30 November 1945, she was struck from the Navy List. On 1 December 1945, she was assigned to the Allied Occupation Force where she served as a minesweeper.

On 29 August 1947, she was ceded to the Republic of China as a war reparation and renamed Cheng An / Chan An (成安).

== Bibliography ==
- Dodson, Aidan & Cant, Serena (2020). Spoils of War: The Fate of Enemy Fleets after Two World Wars. Seaforth Publishing. ISBN 978-1-5267-4198-1.
