= Japanese escort ship CD-204 =

History

Empire of Japan
- Name: CD-204
- Owner: Imperial Japanese Navy
- Builder: Mitsubishi Heavy Industries, Nagasaki
- Laid down: 27 February 1945
- Launched: 14 April 1945
- Completed: 11 July 1945
- Commissioned: 11 July 1945
- Out of service: surrender of Japan, 2 September 1945
- Stricken: 20 November 1945
- Home port: Sasebo
- Fate: Scrapped, 31 January 1948

General characteristics
- Type: Type D escort ship
- Displacement: 740 long tons (752 t) standard
- Length: 69.5 m (228 ft)
- Beam: 8.6 m (28 ft 3 in)
- Draught: 3.05 m (10 ft)
- Propulsion: 1 shaft, geared turbine engines, 2,500 hp (1,864 kW)
- Speed: 17.5 knots (20.1 mph; 32.4 km/h)
- Range: 4,500 nmi (8,300 km) at 16 kn (18 mph; 30 km/h)
- Complement: 160
- Sensors & processing systems: Type 22-Go radar; Type 93 sonar; Type 3 hydrophone
- Armament: As built : 2 × 120 mm (4.7 in)/45 cal DP guns; 6 × Type 96 25 mm (0.98 in) AA machine guns (2×3); 12 × Type 3 depth charge throwers; 1 × depth charge chute; 120 × depth charges; 1 × 81 mm (3.2 in) mortar

CD-204 or No. 204 was a Type D escort ship of the Imperial Japanese Navy during World War II. She was the last of her class.

== History ==
She was laid down on 27 February 1945 at the Nagasaki shipyard of Mitsubishi Heavy Industries for the benefit of the Imperial Japanese Navy and launched on 14 April 1945. On 11 July 1945, she was completed and commissioned in the Sasebo Naval District with captain Zenji Tanaka (田中 善次) as her commanding officer. On 17 July 1945, she was damaged in an accident in Senzaki harbor and then traveled to Maizuru for repairs. The war ended before repairs commenced. On 20 November 1945, she was struck from the Naval List and scrapped on 31 January 1948.
