= MV Tenyo Maru =

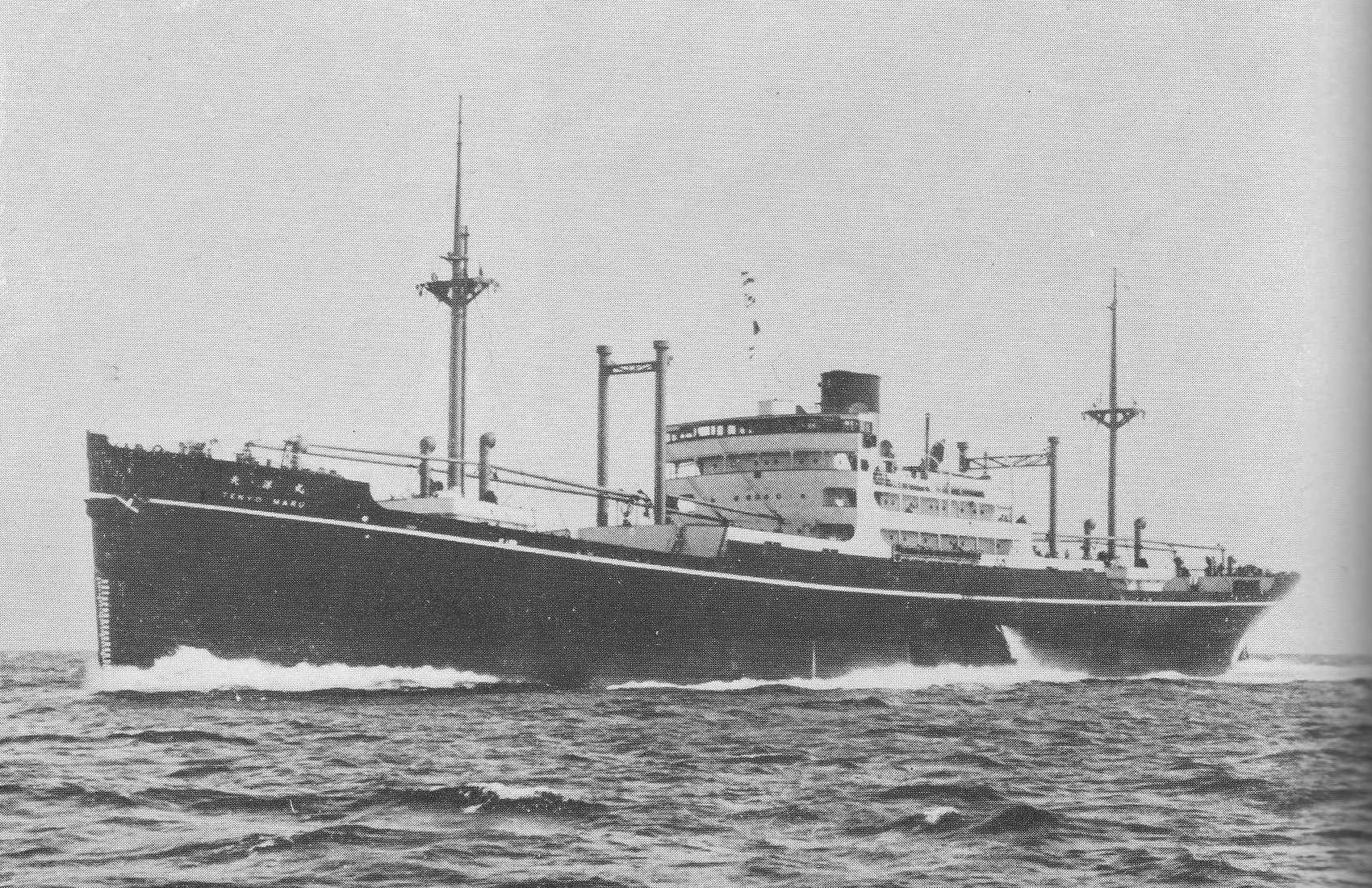

History

Japan
- Name: Tenyo Maru
- Owner: Toyo Kisen Kabushiki Kaisha (1935–1941); Imperial Japanese Navy (1941–1942)
- Ordered: late 1933
- Builder: Mitsubishi, Nagasaki
- Laid down: 3 July 1934
- Launched: 22 January 1935
- In service: 9 September 1941
- Stricken: 1 April 1942
- Fate: Sunk by USS Yorktown (CV-5) on 10 March 1942

General characteristics
- Class & type: cargo ship
- Tonnage: 6,843 GRT
- Length: 435 feet (133 m)
- Beam: 58.5 feet (17.8 m)
- Draught: 32.8 feet (10.0 m)
- Propulsion: diesel engine, one propeller

Tenyo Maru was a 6,843-gross register ton passenger cargo ship built by Mitsubishi, Nagasaki for Toyo Kisen Kabushiki Kaisha in 1935. She was chartered to Mitsui and plied the New York route until she was requisitioned on 9 September 1941 by the Imperial Japanese Navy during World War II and converted at the Harima shipyard to a minelayer, which was completed on 31 October 1941.

Assigned to the Mine Division 19, of the Fourth Fleet, she landed troops at Makin Island. As part of the Rabaul invasion fleet, she carried air base construction materials.

== Fate ==
On 10 March 1942, during the invasion of Lae-Salamaua, Tenyo Maru suffered two direct bomb hits from aircraft from the United States Navy aircraft carriers USS Lexington and USS Yorktown, broke in two and sank off Lae, New Guinea. Tenyo Maru was removed from the Navy List on 1 April 1942.

The bow of the ship was still visible above the water, at the end of the former Lae Airport in the 1970s.
