= Japanese minelayer Yaeyama =

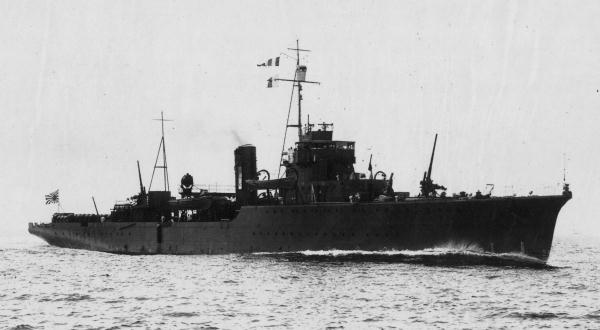
- Yaeyama during trials, 1932

History

Japan
- Name: Yaeyama
- Ordered: fiscal 1927
- Builder: Kure Naval Arsenal
- Laid down: 2 August 1930
- Launched: 13 October 1931
- Commissioned: 31 August 1932
- Stricken: 10 November 1944
- Fate: Sunk in action, 24 September 1944

General characteristics
- Type: minelayer
- Displacement: 1,135 long tons (1,153 t) standard, 1380 tons normal
- Length: 85.5 m (281 ft) pp, 89 m (292 ft) waterline
- Beam: 10.65 m (34 ft 11 in)
- Draught: 2.84 m (9 ft 4 in)
- Propulsion: 2-shaft steam engine, 2 boilers, 4,800 hp (3,600 kW)
- Speed: 20 knots (23 mph; 37 km/h)
- Range: 3,000 nmi (5,600 km) at 14 knots
- Complement: 180
- Armament: 2 × 12 cm/45 10th Year Type naval guns; 2 × Type 93 13 mm AA Guns; 185 × Type 6 naval mines
- Armour: none

Yaeyama (八重山) was a small minelayer of the Imperial Japanese Navy, which was in service during the Second Sino-Japanese War and World War II primarily as an escort vessel. She was named after the Yaeyama Islands in the Ryukyu Islands chain. She was the first Japanese warship built with an all-welded hull.

== Background and construction ==
The Imperial Japanese Navy budget for Fiscal 1927 include a small minelayer for coastal and river service to complement its larger minelayers, the former cruisers Aso, and Tokiwa. Yaeyama was launched by the Kure Naval Arsenal in Hiroshima Prefecture, Japan on 15 October 1931, and was commissioned into service on 31 August 1932.

== Operational history ==
On completion, Yaeyama was assigned to the Sasebo Naval District. In August 1937, following the Marco Polo Bridge Incident and the start of the Second Sino-Japanese War, Yaeyama was assigned as flagship for Admiral Tanimoto’s 11th Gunboat Division, at Shanghai and was responsible for patrols on the Yangzi River. Yaeyama covered the landing of Japanese Special Naval Landing Forces (SNLF) reinforcements in the Battle of Shanghai, and participated in the evacuation of 20,000 Japanese civilians and non-combatants from the city back to Japan. She was then placed on the reserve list on 1 December 1937.

Yaeyama was reactivated on 25 May 1938 and assisted in covering the landings of more Japanese troops in Tianjin and along the Yangzi River in July. She was then assigned to Amoy from 26 September 1939 until her transfer to Palau on 1 December 1941.

At the time of the attack on Pearl Harbor in December 1941, Yaeyama was assigned to “Operation M” (the invasion of the southern Philippines) deploying from Palau to mine the Surigao Strait. On 3 January 1942, she became flagship for Admiral Rokuzo Sugiyama’s Third Southern Expeditionary Fleet and covered landings at Subic Bay. While at Subic May on 1 February, she was attacked unsuccessfully by USS PT-32. Yaeyama was based at Manila from July 1942 under the overall command of the Southwest Area Fleet.

Yaeyama was refit at Cavite Naval Yards as an anti-submarine convoy escort ship in December 1943, with all minelaying rails removed and replaced by 36 depth charges, and was reassigned to the First Southern Expeditionary Fleet. She escorted a convoy of transports from Manila to Singapore in January 1944, and a convoy from Manila to Halmahera Island in May 1944.

On the early morning of 24 September 1944 Yaeyama was sunk after being hit by at least ten bombs during an air attack by 96 Grumman F6F Hellcat and 24 Curtiss SB2C Helldiver aircraft from the carriers USS Intrepid and USS Lexington and the light carrier USS Cabot while anchored in Coron Bay, Busuanga Island, off Palawan Island in the Philippines at 12°15′N 121°00′E. Most of the crew survived, including her commanding officer, Captain Michizo Tsutsumi.

Yaeyama was removed from the navy list on 10 November 1944.
