= Japanese minelayer Minoo =

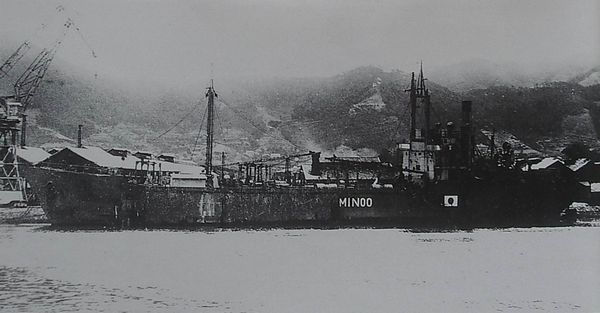
- Minoo in 1947

History

Japan
- Name: Minoo
- Namesake: ancient battlefield in Nanboku-chō period
- Ordered: fiscal 1944
- Builder: Naniwa Dock Company, Osaka
- Laid down: November 29, 1944
- Launched: May 13, 1945
- Commissioned: August 5, 1945
- Stricken: October 5, 1945
- Fate: Scrapped 1947

General characteristics
- Type: minelayer
- Displacement: 3,224 long tons (3,276 t) standard; 5,200 long tons (5,283 t) trial
- Length: 91.7 m (301 ft) pp, 86.25 m (283.0 ft) waterline
- Beam: 13.42 m (44 ft 0 in)
- Draught: 5.85 m (19 ft 2 in)
- Propulsion: 1 × Kampon A Model 12 steam turbine; 1 × Model 2 Scotch boiler; single shaft, 1,200 hp (890 kW)
- Speed: 11 knots (13 mph; 20 km/h)
- Range: 4,000 nmi (7,400 km) at 9.5 kn (10.9 mph; 17.6 km/h) as Type 2D wartime standard cargo ship
- Complement: 94
- Electronic warfare & decoys: 1 × 13-Gō early warning radar; 1 × Type 5 hydrophone
- Armament: 1 × 76.2 mm (3.00 in) L/40 AA gun; 14 × Type 96 25 mm AA guns; 380 × Mk.6 naval mines; 24 × depth charges; 2 × Type 3 depth charge projectors (K-gun); 2 × depth charge throwers
- Armour: none

Minoo (箕面) was a minelayer of the Imperial Japanese Navy, which was in service during the final stages of World War II. She was the lead ship of what was intended to be a two-vessel class, but her sister ship, designated Vessel #1822 was not completed before the end of the war.

== Building ==
During the very final stages of World War II, in preparation for the anticipated Allied invasion of the Japanese home islands, the Imperial Japanese Navy perceived the need to block the entrances to the Sea of Japan, namely the La Pérouse Strait, Tsugaru Strait and Tsushima Strait to protect Japan's long and relatively lightly defended western coastline. However, as all minelayers has been sunk by that time, an emergency program was begun under the Maru Sen Programme to construct several small vessels for this task. Minoo was a modified Type 2D wartime standard cargo ship, which had been laid down by the Naniwa Dock Company on November 29, 1944. It was requisitioned by the Imperial Japanese Navy in December before completion, was launched on May 13, 1945, and was commissioned into service on August 5, 1945, after modifications at the Kure Naval Arsenal.

== Operational history ==
On completion, Minoo was assigned to the Kure Naval District, but the surrender of Japan occurred only 5 days after her commissioning. She was removed from the navy list on October 5, 1945. From September 1945 through December 1946, Minoo was used as a repatriation transport, shuttling between Okinawa, Shanghai, Hakata, and Sasebo returning demobilized Japanese troops and civilians from the Asian mainland to the Japanese home islands. She was scrapped in 1947.

== Ships in class ==
Ship #	Ship	Builder	Laid down	Launched	Completed	Fate
1821	Minoo (箕面)	Naniwa Dock Company	29 November 1944	13 May 1945	5 August 1945	Decommissioned 5 October 1945; scrapped in April 1947
1822		Naniwa Dock Company	1 February 1945	1948	7 June 1948	Construction stopped in April 1945. Transferred to Inui Steamship inc., and construction restarted as merchant ship Kenshin Maru (乾進丸). Sunk by rough weather on 4 October 1948.

== Approximate vessels ==
The IJN used two merchant ships and experimented for before building Minoo. One the Eijō Maru, other the Kōryū Maru. Their conversion was useful for Minoo. Their brief careers are below.

- Eijō Maru (永城丸), ex-Type 2D wartime standard cargo ship, 2,300 long tons (2,337 t) gross
  Launched at Mitsubishi Heavy Industries-Kōnan Shipyard on 11 August 1944, completed on 2 September 1944, enlisted by the Navy on 29 January 1945, classified to auxiliary minelayer and assigned to the Minelayer Division 18 (Escort Fleet) on 10 March 1945, armaments installed on 20 April 1945 at Kure Naval Arsenal, Minelayer Division 18 was moved to 7th Fleet, minelaying at Japanese coastal waters in June 1945, sunk by USS Spadefish off Okushiri Island 42°43′N 139°57′E on 17 June 1945, discharged on 10 August 1945.
- Kōryū Maru (光隆丸), ex-Type 2E wartime standard cargo ship, 870 long tons (884 t) gross
  Launched at Kawanami Kōgyō-Fukabori Shipyard on 22 June 1944, completed on 16 July 1944, transportation duty in Japanese coastal waters between 1944–1945, enlisted by the Navy on 6 May 1945, armaments install started at Hitachi Zōsen-Innoshima on 9 May 1945, classified to auxiliary minelayer and assigned to the Escort Fleet on 7 July 1945, sunk by air raid at Innoshima on 28 July 1945, discharged on 22 May 1946. She was sunk before rebuilt.
