= Ekkai Maru =

Japanese cargo ship (1941–1944)

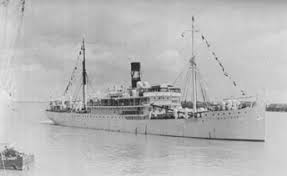
The ship in Honduras during the 1930s.

Ekkai Maru (Japanese: 越海丸, Hiragana: えっかいまる) was a cargo ship in the service of the Empire of Japan from 1941 till 1944. Built in Scotland by Scott Shipbuilding & Engineering Co. for Iquitos Steamship Co. in 1907, she was originally called the SS Manco and later renamed SS Morazán when she was sold to Vaccaro Brothers & Co. in 1921 and sent to Honduras. After being sold to Wallem & Co. of Hong Kong, she was captured by the Imperial Japanese Navy on December 8, 1941, during World War II. She was sunk by Allied aircraft in the Philippines on September 24, 1944.

== Characteristics ==
She was a steam engine mixed cargo ship designed for transoceanic voyages of approximately 2,984 tons, constructed of steel, and of about 35 meters. She was designed primarily to transport both goods and passengers. When she operated for the banana companies in Honduras, she had a couple of modifications as well as a repaint. Once captured it would be used to transport ammunition, equipment, and troops on the front lines of the Pacific. Her engine could give a speed of about 12 knots.

== Operational history ==
The ship was built in 1907 and completed in 1908 by the British company Scott Shipbuilding & Engineering Co. and served the Iquitos Steamship Co. and Booth Steamship Co. under the name of SS Manco in Liverpool, Great Britain, between 1908 and 1921 as a transport ship. She would later be sold and finally served as a freighter for the banana companies in Honduras such as the United fruit Company and she would be baptized as El Morazán, in honor of the Central American hero of Honduran origin, General Francisco Morazán.

Thus, the ship worked for many years to transport fruits such as bananas or rambutan and other merchandise from the ports of cities such as Puerto Cortes, La Ceiba, and Tela to other foreign cities. On one of his trips to East Asia, he was captured by the Imperial Japanese Navy while in the port of Shanghai, a city that had previously belonged to the Republic of China, the city having been occupied by the Empire of Japan since 1937. This happened on December 8, 1941, just one day after the attack on the US naval base at Pearl Harbor. It is believed that the immediate capture of the ship was due to the fact that she operated for a company of US origin and because she belonged to an allied nation of the East, in this case Honduras, which had a very close relationship with the United States.

She was renamed by Japanese soldiers as Ekkai Maru and she served the Japanese for three years to transport ammunition and troops in the fight against the armed forces of the United States. On September 24, 1944, she was sunk by a United States carrier plane in Coron Bay near Manila, western Philippines. The American planes first attacked the Japanese warships in Coron Bay and the other ships toward the West. After a frenzied 45-minute attack, the planes left, leaving behind numerous sunken ships, within them is the Ekkai Maru that finally ended up sink 12 meters.

== See also ==
- Honduras in World War II
