= Type 97 81 mm infantry mortar =

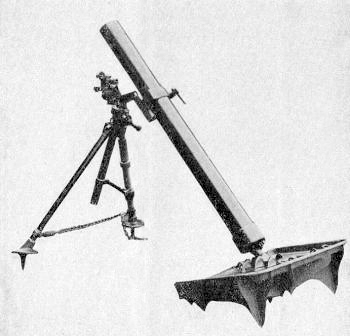
- A Type 97 81 mm infantry mortar
- Place of origin: Empire of Japan

Service history
- Used by: Imperial Japanese Army
- Wars: World War II

Production history
- Produced: 1938-1945
- No. built: 3892

Specifications
- Mass: 66 kg (145 lb)
- Length: 1.4 m (56 in)
- Barrel length: 1.26 m (49.5 in)
- Width: 0.67 m (26.5 in) (baseplate)
- Shell weight: Light HE: 3.3 kg (7 lb 4 oz); Heavy HE: 6.5 kg (14 lb 5 oz)
- Caliber: 81 mm (3.2 in)
- Action: Manual
- Elevation: +45 to +85 degrees
- Muzzle velocity: 196 m/s (643 ft/s)
- Effective firing range: Light HE: 3 km (1.9 mi); Heavy HE: 1.2 km (0.75 mi)

The Type 97 81 mm infantry mortar was the primary Japanese infantry mortar during World War II.

The Type 97 81mm infantry mortar was essentially a straight copy of the Brandt 81mm mortar with only a few Japanese-specific changes that differentiated the type from French and American derivatives. The Type 97 81mm mortar used Type 98 and Type 100 HE rounds, use of smoke and illumination rounds was restricted to larger trench mortar types.

In 1932 the French Brandt company sent two of their 81mm mortars, along with 1,000 rounds, to Japan for trials with the Imperial Army. Initially, the Imperial Japanese Army favored the use of the Type 92 70mm battalion gun as their main infantry support weapon, but by the late 1930s preference changed to the Type 97 81mm mortar due to its light weight and relatively low cost.

A modified version was used by Imperial Japanese Navy with the designation Type 3 mortar as an anti-submarine weapon on escort ships beginning in 1943.

== Design ==
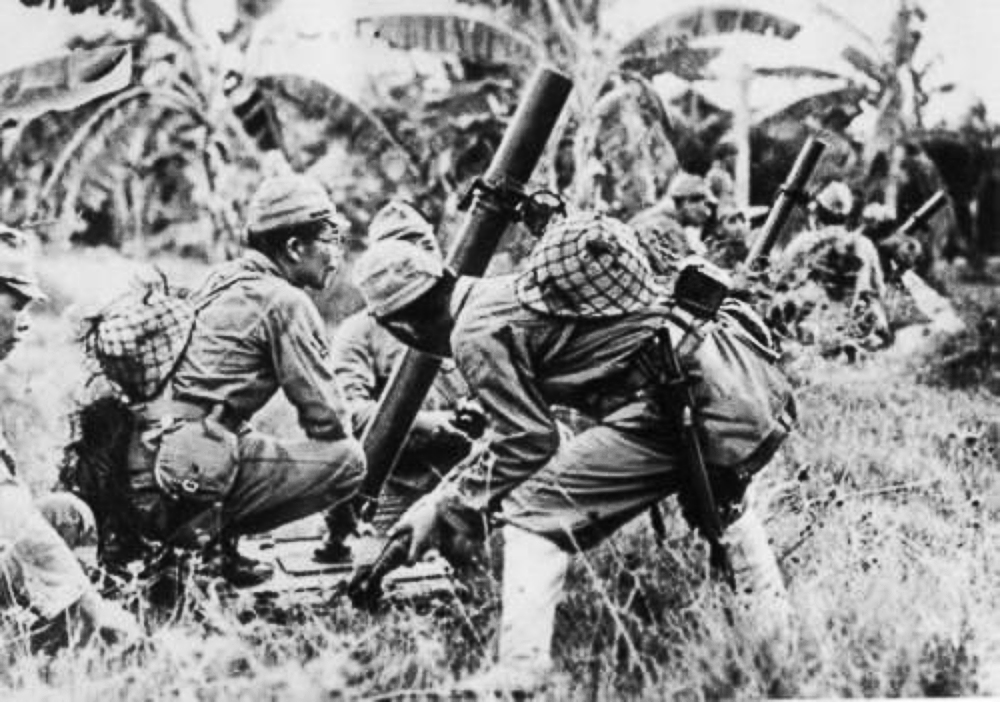
Soldiers of a Special Naval Landing Force unit are preparing their Type 97 mortars for being fired

The Type 97 is a smooth bore, muzzle-loading weapon. It has a fixed firing pin in the breech assembly, and the percussion of the propelling cartridge of the mortar shell against the firing pin propels the shell from the mortar. As many as six propellant increments can be attached to the fins of the mortar shell for the purpose of increasing the range. The mortar and its calibre had its origin as almost all 81.4 mm, 82 mm or "8 cm" mortars in the French Brandt mle 27 81.4 mm mortar. The improved version Brandt Mle 27/31 had become the basis for copies, near-copies and license-built mortars all over the world. The Brandt mortars themselves were evolved from the British Stokes Mortar of different calibre.

A captured Type 97 mortar, which has been studied in detail, was marked "Type 97 High-Angle Infantry Gun". The weapon was manufactured in 1942 in the Osaka Army Arsenal. Although the Japanese weapon closely resembles the US 81-mm mortar, M1, there are several identifying features by which the two can be distinguished. The adjusting nut of the Japanese mortar is on the right bipod leg, while the sight is on the left. Other differences are the buttress-type threads on the traversing and elevating screws of the Japanese weapon, as well as the use of welding to fasten bipod legs to the clevis joint and grease fittings dissimilar to those used by the US model.

The collimator sight for the Type 97 Japanese mortar is heavier and more complicated than that utilized on the US 81-mm mortar Ml. The Japanese sight examined was made entirely of steel, except for the brass bushings used for the elevating and cross-leveling screws. A US M4 sight may be fitted to the Japanese weapon by shimming the sight bracket slightly.

The Type 97 mortar examined had an extension fitted to the sight, raising the latter to the level of the muzzle of the mortar. This extension probably was added to permit sighting of the weapon when it was deeply dug in or slightly in defilade. Elevation scale of the sight is graduated in 50-mil intervals from 700 to 1,600 mils, and a micrometer drum enables elevation readings to be made to the nearest mil. The collimator can be traversed in a full circle, and the azimuth scale is calibrated in 100-mil graduations in two sections of 3,200 mils each. As in the case of elevation, a micrometer drum permits azimuth readings to be made to the nearest mil. There is a throw-out lever for rapid traverse of the collimator, which may be placed at an angle of elevation and locked in position by a series of meshing notches. There are no open sights for rough laying of the piece.

== Ammunition ==
Ammunition recovered for the Type 97 thus far is usually the Type 00 (1940) HE shell. This shell is 12.87 inches (32.7 cm) long and weighs 6.93 pounds (3.14 kg), 1 pound (450 g) of which is the weight of the TNT filler. The fuze is of the instantaneous type, which can be set for delay action, however, by the insertion of a delay pellet in the fuze nose prior to firing. The shell could be fired in the US 81-mm mortar M1, but the range was about 10 per cent shorter than achieved with the US M43 and M43A shells.

The 81mm mortar was also used to launch an unusual AA Mine Discharger shell.

== Specifications ==
Specifications of the weapon are as follows:

Total weight:	145 lb 2 oz (65.83 kg)
Weight of tube:	45 lb 9 oz (20.67 kg)
Weight of bipod:	47 lb 14 oz (21.72 kg)
Weight of base plate:	51 lb 12 oz (23.47 kg)
Over-all length:	56 in (1,400 mm)
Length of tube, including base cap:	49.5 in (1,257.3 mm)
Length of bore:	45.75 in (1,162.0 mm)
Diameter of bore:	82 mm (3.23 in)
Thickness of tube wall:	0.275 in (7.0 mm)
Length of base plate:	16.5 in (419.1 mm)
Width of base plate:	26.5 in (673.1 mm)
Elevation:	+45 to +83 degrees
Muzzle velocity:	196 m/s (643 ft/s)
Range:	2,800 m (9,186 ft 4 in)
