= Type 10 120 mm AA gun =

Type 10 120 mm dual-purpose gun
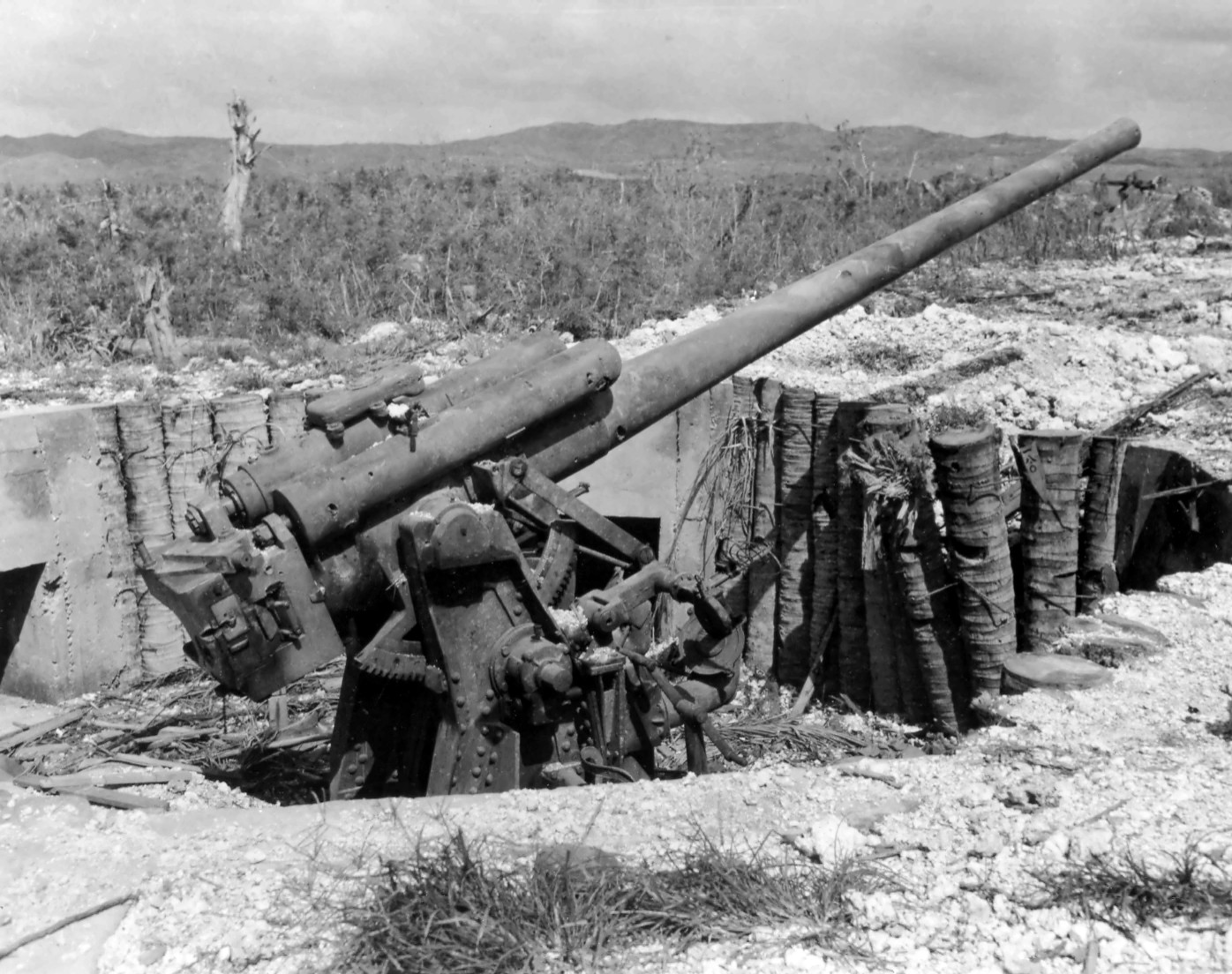
- A damaged dual purpose 120 mm gun from a four gun battery on Guam.
- Type: Dual-purpose gun
- Place of origin: Japan

Service history
- In service: 1921–1945
- Used by: Empire of Japan
- Wars: Second World War

Production history
- Produced: 1921–1945
- No. built: approx 2000

Specifications
- Mass: 8.5 tons
- Length: 5.94 m (19 ft 6 in)
- Barrel length: 5.4 m (17 ft 9 in) L/45
- Width: 2.16 m (7 ft 1 in)
- Height: 2.34 m (7 ft 8 in)
- Shell: Fixed QF 120×708mmR
- Shell weight: 20.6 kg (45 lb 7 oz)
- Caliber: 120 mm (4.7 in)
- Action: Semi-automatic
- Breech: Horizontal sliding-wedge
- Recoil: Hydro-spring
- Carriage: Pedestal mount
- Elevation: -5 to +75 degrees
- Traverse: 360 degrees
- Rate of fire: 10 to 12 rounds per minute
- Muzzle velocity: 825 m/s (2,710 ft/s)
- Effective firing range: Horizontal: 16,000 m (17,000 yd); Vertical: 8,500 m (27,900 ft)
- Maximum firing range: Vertical: 10,000 m (33,000 ft)

The Type 10 or 12 cm/45 10th Year Type naval gun was a Japanese 120 mm calibre dual purpose anti-aircraft and coastal defense gun used during the Second World War. It was derived from the 12 cm/45 3rd Year Type naval gun. The Type 10 number was designated for the year the gun was accepted, the 10th year of Emperor Taishō's reign, 1921 in the Gregorian calendar.

It served as the secondary armament on a number of Japanese aircraft carriers and cruisers and as the main armament on smaller ships, in single or twin mountings.

Despite mediocre traverse and muzzle velocity, the 12cm Type (Taisho) 10 was widely used throughout the Pacific since it was relatively simple to produce, threw a powerful shell, and did not require external power (making it easier to emplace at remote sites). By the end of the war 40% of the naval AA units in homeland Japan were equipped with this weapon as well.

== Description ==
The weapon was originally designed for ship use and was produced in large numbers. The gun was also adapted for land use as a dual-purpose gun. It was one of the few Japanese cannons that could readily handle more heavily armored allied tanks such as the M4 Sherman. The barrel was of autofretted mono-block construction and was held in a sleeve cradle mounted on a pedestal mount which permits 360° of traverse. The gun uses a hydro-spring recoil mechanism attached to the sleeve cradle and there are three recoil cylinders located on top of the breech with the two outside cylinders housing the recoil springs, and the center cylinder housing the hydraulic recuperator. The elevating handwheel is on the right side of the mount, while the traversing handwheel is on the left. To compensate for muzzle preponderance, spring equilibrators are mounted below the gun barrel. The gun is said to be well balanced, and easy to elevate. A semi-automatic horizontal sliding-wedge breech is used and Fixed QF 120 x 708R ammunition was used. The gun fired either high explosive or incendiary shrapnel shells that weighed 20.6 kg (45 lb 7 oz), with a complete round weighing 32.4 kg (71 lb 7 oz).

== Naval use ==
- Furutaka-class cruiser
- Aoba-class cruiser
- Myōkō-class cruiser
- Takao-class cruiser
- Japanese aircraft carrier Akagi
- Japanese aircraft carrier Kaga
- Taiyō-class escort carrier
- Japanese munition ship Kashino
- Escort vessels and auxiliary vessels

== See also ==
=== Weapons of comparable role, performance and era ===
- QF 4.7 inch Mk VIII naval gun : British equivalent naval anti-aircraft gun

== Bibliography ==
- War Department TM-E-30-480 Handbook on Japanese Military Forces September 1944
- Campbell, John (1985). Naval Weapons of World War II. Annapolis, Maryland: Naval Institute Press. ISBN 0-87021-459-4.
