= Japanese submarine Yu 2002 =

Imperial Japanese Army Yu 1-class submarine

History

Japan
- Name: Yu 2002
- Builder: Ando Iron Works, Tsukishima, Tokyo, Japan
- Launched: 31 March 1945
- Fate: Surrendered August 1945; Scuttled or scrapped

General characteristics Yu I type
- Type: Transport submarine
- Displacement: 274 long tons (278 t) surfaced; 346 long tons (352 t) submerged
- Length: 41.40 m (135 ft 10 in) overall
- Beam: 3.90 m (12 ft 10 in)
- Draft: 3.00 m (9 ft 10 in)
- Propulsion: 2 × Hesselman engines; 298 kW (400 bhp) surfaced; 56 kW (75 shp) submerged; single shaft
- Speed: 10 knots (19 km/h; 12 mph) surfaced; 4 knots (7.4 km/h; 4.6 mph) submerged
- Range: 1,500 nmi (2,800 km; 1,700 mi) at 8 knots (15 km/h; 9.2 mph) surfaced; 32 nmi (59 km; 37 mi) at 4 knots (7.4 km/h; 4.6 mph) submerged
- Test depth: 100 m (328 ft)
- Capacity: 24 tons freight or 40 troops
- Complement: 23
- Armament: 1 × Type 4 37 mm shipboard gun; 2 × IJN Type 92 13 mm antiaircraft guns

Yu 2002 was an Imperial Japanese Army transport submarine, a unit of the Yu 2001 subclass of the Yu I type. Constructed for use during the latter stages of World War II, she served in the waters of the Japanese archipelago.

== Construction ==
In the final two years of World War II, the Imperial Japanese Army constructed transport submarines — officially the Type 3 submergence transport vehicle and known to the Japanese Army as the Maru Yu — with which to supply its isolated island garrisons in the Pacific. Only submarines of the Yu I type were completed and saw service. The Yu I type was produced in four subclasses, each produced by a different manufacturer and differing primarily in the design of their conning towers and details of their gun armament. The submarines of the Yu 2001 subclass notably differed from the other Yu I-type submarines in their "repose room," a deckhouse extending aft of the conning tower which gave the crew more room and greater comfort. None of the Yu I-type submarines carried torpedoes or had torpedo tubes. Yu 2002 was a unit of the Yu 2001 subclass.

Ando Iron Works (Ando Tekkojo) constructed Yu 2002 in the Tsukishima district of Tokyo, Japan. She was launched on 31 March 1945.

== Service history ==
Yu 2002 spent her operational career in Japanese home waters. In January 1945, several Type I transport submarines were sent to operate from Shimoda on the southern tip of the Izu Peninsula in Shizuoka Prefecture on Honshu, and the submarines began transport missions from Shimoda in March 1945. Yu 2002 made a round-trip supply voyage from Shimoda to Hachijō-jima in the Philippine Sea sometime during 1945.

World War II ended with the cessation of hostilities on 15 August 1945. Yu 2002 surrendered to the Allies later in August 1945. She was subsequently either scuttled or scrapped.
