= Yu-7 =

Yu-7 or Yu 7 may refer to:

- Yu-7 torpedo, a Chinese torpedo
- Japanese submarine Yu 7, an Imperial Japanese Army transport submarine of World War II
- Xiaomi YU7
