= Yu-4 =

Yu-4 or Yu 4 may refer to:

- Yu-4 torpedo, a Chinese torpedo
- Japanese submarine Yu 4, an Imperial Japanese Army transport submarine of World War II
