= Japanese submarine Yu 3003 =

Imperial Japanese Army Yu 3001-class submarine

History

Japan
- Name: Yu 3003
- Builder: Korea Machine Factory Boat Manufacturing Works, Inchon, Chosen (Korea)
- Fate: Surrendered August 1945; Scuttled or scrapped

General characteristics Yu I type
- Type: Transport submarine
- Displacement: 274 long tons (278 t) surfaced; 346 long tons (352 t) submerged
- Length: 41.40 m (135 ft 10 in) overall
- Beam: 3.90 m (12 ft 10 in)
- Draft: 3.00 m (9 ft 10 in)
- Propulsion: 2 × Hesselman engines; 300 kW (400 bhp) surfaced; 56 kW (75 shp) submerged; single shaft
- Speed: 10 knots (19 km/h; 12 mph) surfaced; 4 knots (7.4 km/h; 4.6 mph) submerged
- Range: 1,500 nmi (2,800 km; 1,700 mi) at 8 knots (15 km/h; 9.2 mph) surfaced; 32 nmi (59 km; 37 mi) at 4 knots (7.4 km/h; 4.6 mph) submerged
- Test depth: 100 m (328 ft)
- Capacity: 24 tons freight or 40 troops
- Complement: 23
- Armament: 1 x deck gun

Yu 3003 was an Imperial Japanese Army transport submarine, a unit of the Yu 3001 subclass of the Yu I type. Constructed for use during World War II, she served in the waters of the Japanese archipelago

== Construction ==
In the final two years of World War II, the Imperial Japanese Army constructed transport submarines — officially the Type 3 submergence transport vehicle and known to the Japanese Army as the Maru Yu — with which to supply its isolated island garrisons in the Pacific. Only submarines of the Yu I type were completed and saw service. The Yu I type was produced in four subclasses, each produced by a different manufacturer and differing primarily in the design of their conning towers and details of their gun armament. None carried torpedoes or had torpedo tubes. Yu 3003 was a unit of the Yu 3001 subclass.

The Korea Machine Factory Boat Manufacturing Works (Chosen Kikan Seisakujo Jinsen Kojo Seizotai) constructed Yu 3003 at Inchon in Chosen, the Japanese name for Korea while Korea was under Japanese rule. Records of the details of the construction of Yu 3003 have not been discovered, but the lead unit of her subclass, her sister ship Yu 3001, entered service in August 1944.

One source claims the North Korea Machine Works (Kikai Seisakujo) at Wonsan, Korea, built all submarines of the Yu 3001 subclass.

== Service history ==
Yu 3003 spent her operational career in Japanese home waters. Surviving records of the activities of Imperial Japanese Army submarines are fragmentary, and no records have been discovered describing her specific activities in support of any particular operation.

World War II ended with the cessation of hostilities on 15 August 1945. Yu 3003 surrendered to the Allies later in August 1945. She subsequently either was scuttled or scrapped.
