= Yu-3 =

Yu-3 or Yu 3may refer to:

- Yu-3 torpedo, a Chinese torpedo
- Japanese submarine Yu 3, an Imperial Japanese Army transport submarine of World War II
