= Type 3 submergence transport vehicle =

Vehicle used for transportation

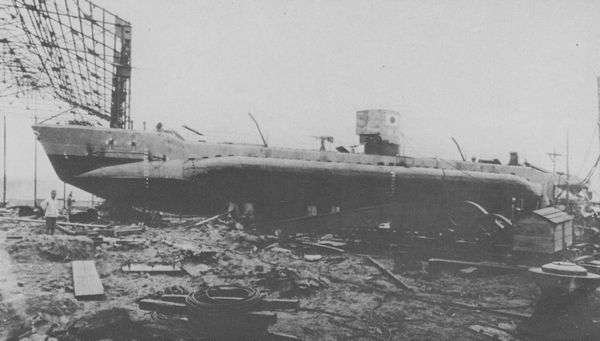
- Yu 1 in Hitachi, Kasado Factory (1943)

Class overview
- Name: Type 3 submergence transport vehicle
- Builders: Hitachi; Japan Steel Works; Andō Iron Works; Chōsen Machinery
- Operators: Imperial Japanese Army
- Subclasses: Yu I type; Yu 1 (Hitachi Ltd.); Yu 1001 (Japan Steel Works); Yu 2001 (Andō Iron Works); Yu 3001 (Chōsen Machinery); Yu II type; Ushio (Prototype, Hitachi Ltd.)
- Built: 1943–45
- In commission: 1943–45
- Planned: 420
- Completed: 38
- Lost: 4
- Scrapped: 34

General characteristics Yu I type
- Type: Transport submarine
- Displacement: 274 long tons (278 t) surfaced; 346 long tons (352 t) submerged
- Length: 41.40 m (135 ft 10 in) overall
- Beam: 3.90 m (12 ft 10 in)
- Draft: 3.00 m (9 ft 10 in)
- Propulsion: 2 × Hesselman engines; 298 kW (400 bhp) surfaced; 56 kW (75 shp) submerged; single shaft
- Speed: 10 knots (19 km/h; 12 mph) surfaced; 4 knots (7.4 km/h; 4.6 mph) submerged
- Range: 1,500 nmi (2,800 km; 1,700 mi) at 8 knots (15 km/h; 9.2 mph) surfaced; 32 nmi (59 km; 37 mi) at 4 knots (7.4 km/h; 4.6 mph) submerged
- Test depth: 100 m (330 ft)
- Capacity: 24 tons freight or 40 troops
- Complement: 23
- Armament: Yu 1, Yu 2 and Yu 3; 1 × Type 4 37 mm shipboard gun; 5 × Type 99 light machine guns; Yu 1001; 1 × Type 4 37 mm shipboard gun; 2 × IJN Type 92 13 mm AA guns; Yu 2001; 1 × Type 4 37 mm shipboard gun

General characteristics Yu II type
- Type: Transport submarine
- Displacement: 430 long tons (437 t) surfaced; 540 long tons (549 t) submerged
- Length: 55 m (180 ft 5 in) overall
- Beam: 7 m (23 ft 0 in)
- Draft: 3.13 m (10 ft 3 in)
- Propulsion: 2 × intermediate diesels; 520 kW (700 bhp) surfaced, 2 shafts
- Speed: 14.5 knots (26.9 km/h; 16.7 mph) surfaced; 4.5 knots (8.3 km/h; 5.2 mph) submerged
- Test depth: 150 m (492 ft 2 in)
- Capacity: 40 tons freight
- Armament: 1 × Type 1 47 mm AT gun; 5 × Type 98 20 mm AA guns

The Type 3 submergence transport vehicle (三式潜航輸送艇, San-Shiki Senkō Yusōtei) was a class of transport submarines built for the Imperial Japanese Army (IJA) during World War II. The IJA called them Maru Yu (マルゆ).

== Design and construction ==
The six-month-long Guadalcanal campaign came to an end in early February 1943, when the last Imperial Japanese Army (IJA) forces withdrew from Guadalcanal. Later that month, the IJA′s 10th Army Staff Headquarters, which was responsible for all IJA-operated ships, decided it would need to develop its own transport submarine — which it provisionally designated "transport boat" (Yuso-tei, abbreviated as Yu-tei) — with which to supply isolated IJA island garrisons in the Pacific Ocean. On 5 March 1943, the 10th Army Staff Headquarters began work with the 7th Army Research Institute to design such a submarine, find suitable manufacturers and shipyard space for the construction of a fleet of them, and complete 20 of them by end of 1943, followed by an additional 400 submarines in later years.

The IJA initially intended to keep its submarine program secret from the Imperial Japanese Navy (IJN), but the uncle of one of the officers assigned to the program was an IJN vice admiral in charge of equipping IJN submarines at the Kure Naval Arsenal in Kure, Japan. This soon led to cooperation between the IJA and IJN that included tours of IJN submarines for IJA officers and the sharing of IJN technical information with the IJA.

The IJA staff established a requirement for a submarine capable of at least 5 knots (9.3 km/h; 5.8 mph) on the surface and a cargo capacity of 24 tons of rice. In early April 1943, the design for a simple "underwater transport boat" (senko yusotei) was submitted for approval and approved with only minor changes. The submarines had a designed diving depth of 100 meters (328 ft) and were armed with a 37-millimeter deck gun originally designed for use in tanks. They had no torpedo tubes and carried no torpedoes. As completed, they received the official designation "Type 3 submergence transport vehicle" — known unofficially to the IJA as Maru Yu — and the first production type was classified as the Yu 1 Type.

With all shipyards under IJN supervision and busy to capacity fulfilling IJN requirements, the IJA turned to locomotive and motor vehicle manufacturers to build its submarines. It selected Hitachi′s Kasado Works in Kudamatsu, Japan, to build the prototype, Yu 1, and the first production series. Each submarine was built in three sections — fore, middle, and aft — in steel cradles, and the cradles then were moved via marine railways to the water's edge, where the sections were joined using electric resistance welding. When almost complete, the submarine was launched by simply moving the cradles into the water, after which final fitting-out took place.

Three other manufacturers also produced Yu I type submarines The Japan Steel Works constructed the Yu 1001 series at a plant in Hiroshima, while the Ando Iron Works built the Yu 2001 series in the Tsukishima district of Tokyo and the Korea Machine Factory Boat Manufacturing Works at Inchon in Chosen, the Japanese name for Korea while Korea was under Japanese rule, constructed the Yu 3001 series. (One source claims the Yu 3001 series was built by the North Korea Machine Works in Wonsan, Korea.) Each manufacturer's submarines differed in detail from those built by other companies, resulting in four unofficial subclasses of the Yu I type.

An improved IJA transport submarine designated the Yu II type was planned, but the prototype for it was not completed.

The first submarine, Yu 1, entered service in the final days of December 1943. The IJA planned to build 420 transport submarines, but completed only 38 by the end of war in August 1945.

== Operations ==
Three submarines — Yu 1, Yu 2, and Yu 3 — deployed to the Philippines in 1944, where all were lost between November 1944 and January 1945 during the Philippines campaign of 1944–1945. The rest of the IJA submarine fleet remained in Japanese home waters, operating from the main Imperial Japanese Army transport submarine base on the Seto Inland Sea at Mishima in Ehime Prefecture on Shikoku. In March 1945, several began operations from Shimoda on the southern tip of the Izu Peninsula in Shizuoka Prefecture on Honshu, and by May 1945 operations also had begun from Kuchinotsu in Nagasaki Prefecture on Kyushu. The IJA submarine fleet made supply runs from Mishima to Ōshima Island in March 1945, from Kuchinotsu in Nagasaki Prefecture on Kyushu to Tokunoshima in the Amami Islands in the northeastern Ryukyu Islands in July 1945, and from Shimoda to Hachijō-jima in the Philippine Sea sometime during 1945. When the war ended in August 1945, the IJA was preparing to initiate a submarine supply route between Senzaki in Yamaguchi Prefecture and Pusan, Korea.

Yu 1001 was sunk in a U.S. air raid in the final days of the war, and the rest of the IJA submarine fleet surrendered to the Allies at the end of the war. Some subsequently sank in a storm and were refloated and scrapped. The rest presumably were either scrapped or scuttled.

== Submarines ==
=== Yu I type ===
The class consists of four unofficial subclasses resulting from manufacturing differences among the contracted builders. The manufacturer can be discerned by the appearance of the conning tower.

==== Yu 1-class ====
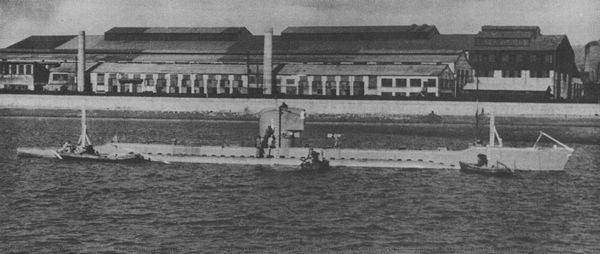
Yu 1 in trial at Kudamatsu (1944)

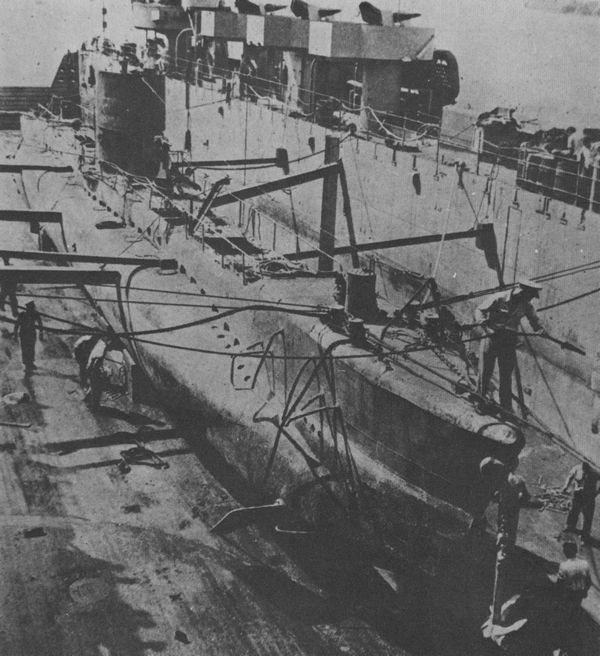
Yu 3 docking to USS Rushmore (1945)

Basic model of Yu I type. First boat Yu 1 was prototype of the Yu I-type submarines. The Hitachi-Kasado Factory built all of the Yu 1-subclass boats. Their conning tower was closed.

- Yu 1, laid down in February 1943, completed on 31 October 1943, sunk by U.S. aircraft in Lingayen Gulf on 2 January 1945.
- Yu 2, sunk by USS Pringle (DD-477), USS Renshaw (DD-499), Waller, and USS Saufley (DD-465) in Ormoc Bay on 28 November 1944.
- Yu 3, attacked by U.S. aircraft and scuttled by her crew in Lingayen Gulf on 5 January 1945, salvaged by USS Grasp (ARS-24) on 18 January 1945, transported to United States by USS Rushmore (LSD-14) in May 1945.
- Yu 4, survived war.
- Yu 5, survived war.
- Yu 6, assigned Detachment 2, Transport Submarine Group on 13 February 1945, survived war.
- Yu 7, assigned Detachment 2, Transport Submarine Group in November 1944, survived war.
- Yu 8, survived war.
- Yu 9, survived war.
- Yu 10, assigned Detachment Kuchinotsu, Transport Submarine Group on 15 May 1945, survived war.
- Yu 11, assigned Detachment Kuchinotsu, Transport Submarine Group on 15 May 1945, assigned Detachment Mikuriya in June 1945, survived war.
- Yu 12, assigned Detachment Kuchinotsu, Transport Submarine Group on 15 May 1945, survived war.
- Yu 13, assigned Detachment Mikuriya in June 1945, survived war.
- Yu 14, assigned Detachment Kuchinotsu, Transport Submarine Group on 15 May 1945, assigned Detachment Mikuriya in June 1945, survived war.
- Yu 15, survived war.
- Yu 16, survived war.
- Yu 17, survived war.
- Yu 18, survived war.
- Yu 19, survived war.
- Yu 20, survived war.
- Yu 21, survived war.
- Yu 22, survived war.
- Yu 23, survived war.
- Yu 24, survived war.
- Yu 25, not completed.

==== Yu 1001-class ====
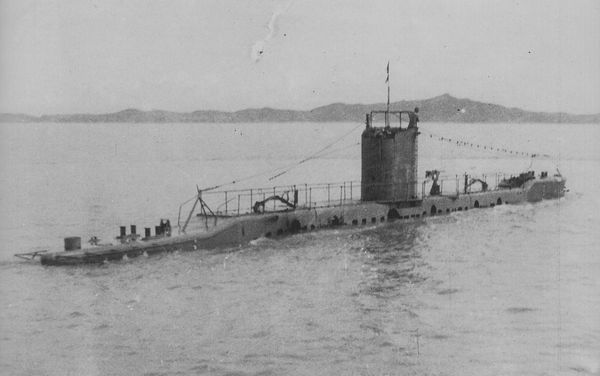
Yu 1001 class at Tateyama (1945)

The Japan Steel Works-Kaita Factory built all of the Yu 1001-subclass submarines. They were longer and had a slightly higher displacement than the Yu 1 subclass and a more powerful diesel engine which increased their maximum surface speed by about 2 knots (3.7 km/h; 2.3 mph). They had an open-top conning tower. One source claims that it is "unlikely" that they mounted a deck gun.

- Yu 1001, launched on 27 March 1944, completed on 15 June 1944, assigned Detachment 2, Transport Submarine Group in November 1944, sunk by air raid at Shimoda on 12 August 1945.
- Yu 1002, assigned Detachment 2, Transport Submarine Group on 11 February 1945, survived war.
- Yu 1003, assigned Detachment 2, Transport Submarine Group on 11 February 1945, survived war.
- Yu 1005, assigned Detachment 2, Transport Submarine Group on 13 February 1945, survived war.
- Yu 1006, survived war.
- Yu 1007, assigned Detachment Kuchinotsu, Transport Submarine Group on 15 May 1945, assigned Detachment Mikuriya in June 1945, survived war.
- Yu 1008, survived war.
- Yu 1009, survived war.
- Yu 1010, survived war.
- Yu 1011, not completed.
- Yu 1012, not completed.
- Yu 1013, not completed.
- Yu 1014, not completed.

==== Yu 2001-class ====
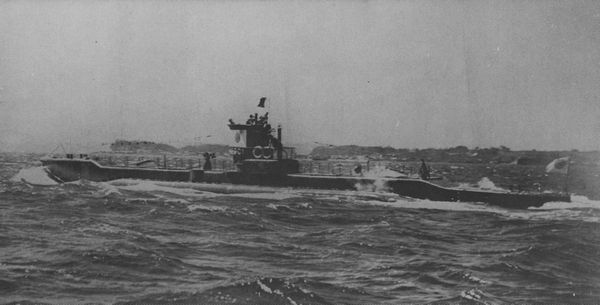
Yu 2001 trial-run in Tōkyō Bay (1944)

The Andō Iron Works-Tsukishima Factory built all of the Yu 2001-subclass submarines. First boat (Yu-2001) was the second prototype of the Yu I-type submarines. The Yu 2001 subclass featured a "repose room" — a deckhouse built aft from the root of the conning tower — for improved crew comfort.

- Yu 2001, launched on 12 February 1944, survived war.
- Yu 2002, launched on 31 March 1945, survived war.
- Yu 2003, not completed.
- Yu 2004, not completed.
- Yu 2005, not completed.
- Yu 2006, not completed.

==== Yu 3001-class ====
The Chōsen Machinery-Jinsen Factory built all of the Yu 3001-subclass submarines. No information is available on their design.

- Yu 3001, launched on 10 April 1944, completed on 2 August 1944, survived war.
- Yu 3002, sunk by rough weather in 1945.
- Yu 3003, survived war.
- Yu 3005, not completed.
- Yu 3006, not completed.
- Yu 3007, not completed.
- Yu 3008, not completed.
- Yu 3009, not completed.
- Yu 3010, not completed.

=== Yu II type ===
Improved model of the Yu I type. Yu II was built by Kampon technical guidance. The IJN used the Ha-101-class submarine drawings and designed this.

- Ushio, prototype of the Yu II type, laid down in August 1944, launched on 16 May 1945, not completed.

== See also ==
- Type D submarine
- Ha-101-class submarine
- German submarine Deutschland
- Type 4 Ka-Tsu
- Imperial Japanese Army Railways and Shipping Section
- Italian R-class submarine

== Bibliography ==
- Bagnasco, Erminio (1977). Submarines of World War Two. Annapolis, Maryland: Naval Institute Press. ISBN 0-87021-962-6.
- Bailey, Mark L. (1998). "Imperial Japanese Army Transport Submarines: Details of the YU-2 Class Submarine YU-3". Warship International. XXXV (1): 55–63.
- Carpenter, Dorr B. & Polmar, Norman (1986). Submarines of the Imperial Japanese Navy 1904–1945. London, England: Conway Maritime Press. ISBN 0-85177-396-6.
- Chesneau, Roger, ed. (1980). Conway's All the World's Fighting Ships 1922–1946. London, England: Conway Maritime Press. ISBN 0-85177-146-7.
- Mühlthaler, Erich (1998). "Re:Imperial Japanese Army Transport Submarines". Warship International. XXXV (4): 329–330. ISSN 0043-0374.
- Rekishi Gunzō, History of Pacific War Extra, Perfect guide, The submarines of the Imperial Japanese Forces, Gakken, Tokyo Japan, 2005, ISBN 4-05-603890-2.
- Rekishi Gunzō, History of Pacific War Vol.45, Truth histories of the Imperial Japanese Naval Vessels, Gakken, Tokyo Japan, 2004, ISBN 4-05-603412-5.
- Ships of the World No.506, Kaijinsha, Tokyo Japan, 1996.
- The Maru Special, Japanese Naval Vessels No.43 Japanese Submarines III, Ushio Shobō, Tokyo Japan, 1980.
- Atsumi Nakashima, Army Submarine Fleet, "The secret project !, The men challenged the deep sea", Shinjinbutsu Ōraisha, Tokyo Japan, 2006, ISBN 4-404-03413-X.
- 50 year history of the Japan Steel Works (first volume and second volume), Japan Steel Works, 1968.
