= Yu-5 =

Yu-5 or Yu 5 may refer to:

- Yu-5 torpedo, a Chinese torpedo
- Japanese submarine Yu 5, an Imperial Japanese Army transport submarine of World War II
