= Yu-1 =

Yu 1 or Yu-1 may refer to:

- Japanese submarine Yu 1, an Imperial Japanese Army transport submarine in service from 1943 to 1945
- Yu-1 torpedo, a Chinese-built torpedo
