= Yu-6 =

Yu-6 or Yu 6 may refer to:

- Yu-6 torpedo, a Chinese torpedo
- Japanese submarine Yu 6, an Imperial Japanese Army transport submarine of World War II
