= Japanese submarine Yu 8 =

Imperial Japanese Army Yu 1-class submarine

History

Japan
- Name: Yu 8
- Builder: Hitachi Kasado Works, Kudamatsu, Japan
- Fate: Surrendered August 1945; Scuttled or scrapped

General characteristics Yu I type
- Type: Transport submarine
- Displacement: 274 long tons (278 t) surfaced; 346 long tons (352 t) submerged
- Length: 41.40 m (135 ft 10 in) overall
- Beam: 3.90 m (12 ft 10 in)
- Draft: 3.00 m (9 ft 10 in)
- Propulsion: 2 × Hesselman engines; 298 kW (400 bhp) surfaced; 56 kW (75 shp) submerged; single shaft
- Speed: 10 knots (19 km/h; 12 mph) surfaced; 4 knots (7.4 km/h; 4.6 mph) submerged
- Range: 1,500 nmi (2,800 km; 1,700 mi) at 8 knots (15 km/h; 9.2 mph) surfaced; 32 nmi (59 km; 37 mi) at 4 knots (7.4 km/h; 4.6 mph) submerged
- Test depth: 100 m (328 ft)
- Capacity: 24 tons freight or 40 troops
- Complement: 23
- Armament: 1 × Type 4 37 mm shipboard gun; 5 × Type 99 light machine guns

Yu 8 was an Imperial Japanese Army transport submarine of the Yu 1 subclass of the Yu I type. Constructed for use during the latter stages of World War II, she served in the waters of the Japanese archipelago.

== Construction ==
In the final two years of World War II, the Imperial Japanese Army constructed transport submarines — officially the Type 3 submergence transport vehicle and known to the Japanese Army as the Maru Yu — with which to supply its isolated island garrisons in the Pacific Ocean. Only submarines of the Yu I type were completed and saw service. The Yu I type was produced in four subclasses, each produced by a different manufacturer and differing primarily in the design of their conning towers and details of their gun armament. None carried torpedoes or had torpedo tubes. Yu 8 was a unit of the Yu 1 subclass.

The Hitachi Kasado Works (Hitachi Kasado Seisakujo) at Kudamatsu, Japan, constructed Yu 8. Records of the details of the construction of Yu 8 have not been discovered, but the earlier Yu I-type submarines were laid down and launched during the latter half of 1943 and entered service at the end of 1943 or early in 1944.

== Service history ==
Yu 8 spent her operational career in Japanese home waters. Surviving records of the activities of Imperial Japanese Army submarines are fragmentary, and no records have been discovered describing her specific activities in support of any particular operation.

World War II ended with the cessation of hostilities on 15 August 1945. Yu 8 surrendered to the Allies later in August 1945. She subsequently either was scuttled or scrapped.
