= Japanese submarine Yu 2 =

Imperial Japanese Army Yu 1-class submarine

History

Japan
- Name: Yu 2
- Builder: Hitachi Kasado Works, Kudamatsu, Japan
- Laid down: 1943
- Launched: 1943
- Fate: Sunk 28 November 1944

General characteristics Yu I type
- Type: Transport submarine
- Displacement: 274 long tons (278 t) surfaced; 346 long tons (352 t) submerged
- Length: 41.40 m (135 ft 10 in) overall
- Beam: 3.90 m (12 ft 10 in)
- Draft: 3.00 m (9 ft 10 in)
- Propulsion: 2 × Hesselman engines; 298 kW (400 bhp) surfaced; 56 kW (75 shp) submerged; single shaft
- Speed: 10 knots (19 km/h; 12 mph) surfaced; 4 knots (7.4 km/h; 4.6 mph) submerged
- Range: 1,500 nmi (2,800 km; 1,700 mi) at 8 knots (15 km/h; 9.2 mph) surfaced; 32 nmi (59 km; 37 mi) at 4 knots (7.4 km/h; 4.6 mph) submerged
- Test depth: 100 m (328 ft)
- Capacity: 24 tons freight or 40 troops
- Complement: 23
- Armament: 1 × Type 4 37 mm shipboard gun; 5 × Type 99 light machine guns

Yu 2 was an Imperial Japanese Army transport submarine of the Yu 1 subclass of the Yu I type. Constructed for use during World War II, she participated in the Philippines campaign of 1944–1945 and was sunk in 1944 while attempting to supply Japanese forces in the Battle of Leyte.

== Construction ==
In the final two years of World War II, the Imperial Japanese Army constructed transport submarines — officially the Type 3 submergence transport vehicle and known to the Japanese Army as the Maru Yu — with which to supply its isolated island garrisons in the Pacific Ocean. Only submarines of the Yu I type were completed and saw service. The Yu I type was produced in four subclasses, each produced by a different manufacturer and differing primarily in the design of their conning towers and details of their gun armament. None carried torpedoes or had torpedo tubes. Yu 2 was of the Yu 1 subclass.

Yu 2 was laid down in 1943 by the Hitachi Kasado Works (Hitachi Kasado Seisakujo) at Kudamatsu, Japan. She was launched later in 1943.

== Service history ==
After her delivery to the Japanese Army, Yu 2 initially remained in Japanese home waters while the Army constructed additional submarines of her class and established a training program for their crews. In May 1944, the Army created its first submarine combat unit (jissen butai), the Manila Underwater Transport Detachment (Manira Sensuiyuso Hakentai), consisting of Yu 2, her sister ships Yu 1 and Yu 3, and a mother ship. The detachment got underway from Japan on either 28 or 30 May 1944 (according to different sources) bound for Manila on Luzon in the Philippines. The vessels had a difficult voyage which included a number of mechanical breakdowns, but finally arrived at Manila on 18 July 1944. After their arrival, the three submarines underwent repairs and thorough overhauls.

On 20 October 1944, United States Army forces landed on Leyte, beginning both the Battle of Leyte and the broader Philippines campaign of 1944–1945. In November 1944, all three submarines departed on their first supply run to Leyte, bound for Ormoc on Leyte's west coast. Stopping at Bansaan, Yu 2 got back underway on 26 November 1944 for the last leg of her voyage to Ormoc. After she transmitted a message from a position south of Ormoc on 27 November 1944, the Japanese never heard from her again.

On the night of 27–28 November 1944, the United States Navy destroyers USS Saufley (DD-465), USS Waller (DD-466), USS Pringle (DD-477), and USS Renshaw (DD-499) made an anti-shipping sweep in Ormoc Bay. After conducting an hour-long shore bombardment, they headed into the Camotes Sea to hunt Japanese shipping. Just after midnight on 28 November, a United States Navy PBY Catalina flying boat reported sighting a Japanese submarine on the surface near Pacijan Island heading toward Ormoc Bay, and the destroyers reversed course and steered to intercept the submarine. At 01:27 Waller picked up a surface contact on radar at a range of 10,200 yards (9,300 m) just off Pilar Point. Waller illuminated the area with star shells and identified the contact as a surfaced submarine, and all four destroyers opened fire on it. By 01:38 Waller had closed to a range of 50 meters (55 yd) and was firing at the submarine with 5-inch (127 mm) and 40-millimeter guns while the submarine attempted to return fire with her deck gun. At 01:45, the submarine sank by the stern, leaving six survivors in the water which the destroyers did not attempt to pick up because of their apparent hostile intent toward would-be rescuers. The submarine the destroyers sank probably was Yu 2.

Some historians have identified the submarine sunk on 28 November 1944 as I-46, but the Japanese did not hear from I-46 after 26 October 1944 and she probably was lost in late October or early November 1944. It is unlikely the U.S. destroyers encountered I-46 on 28 November, and far more likely that they sank Yu 2.
