= Japanese submarine Yu 1005 =

Imperial Japanese Army Yu 1-class submarine

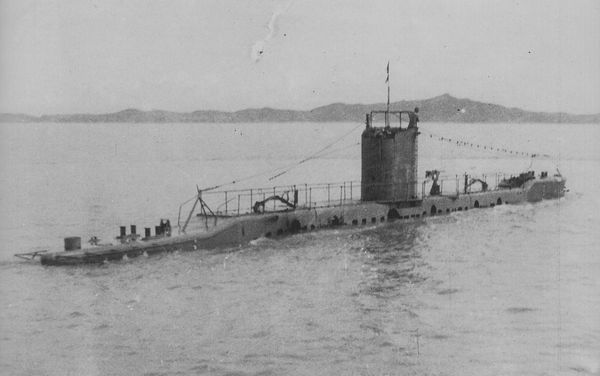
- An unidentified Yu I-type submarine of the Yu 1001 subclass in Tateyama Bay on the coast of Japan in 1945.

History

Japan
- Name: Yu 1005
- Builder: Japan Steel Works, Hiroshima, Japan
- Fate: Surrendered August 1945; Scuttled or scrapped

General characteristics Yu I type
- Type: Transport submarine
- Displacement: 274 long tons (278 t) surfaced; 346 long tons (352 t) submerged
- Length: 41.40 m (135 ft 10 in) overall
- Beam: 3.90 m (12 ft 10 in)
- Draft: 3.00 m (9 ft 10 in)
- Propulsion: 2 × Hesselman engines; 298 kW (400 bhp) surfaced; 56 kW (75 shp) submerged; single shaft
- Speed: 10 knots (19 km/h; 12 mph) surfaced; 4 knots (7.4 km/h; 4.6 mph) submerged
- Range: 1,500 nmi (2,800 km; 1,700 mi) at 8 knots (15 km/h; 9.2 mph) surfaced; 32 nmi (59 km; 37 mi) at 4 knots (7.4 km/h; 4.6 mph) submerged
- Test depth: 100 m (328 ft)
- Capacity: 24 tons freight or 40 troops
- Complement: 23
- Armament: 1 × Type 4 37 mm shipboard gun; 2 × IJN Type 92 13 mm antiaircraft guns

Yu 1005 was an Imperial Japanese Army transport submarine of the Yu 1001 subclass of the Yu I type. Constructed for use during the latter stages of World War II, she served in the waters of the Japanese archipelago.

== Construction ==
In the final two years of World War II, the Imperial Japanese Army constructed transport submarines — officially the Type 3 submergence transport vehicle and known to the Japanese Army as the Maru Yu — with which to supply its isolated island garrisons in the Pacific. Only submarines of the Yu I type were completed and saw service. The Yu I type was produced in four subclasses, each produced by a different manufacturer and differing primarily in the design of their conning towers and details of their gun armament, although one source states that the Yu 1001 subclass differed from the original Yu 1 sublcass in other ways, being longer, having a slightly larger displacement and more powerful diesel engine that increased the maximum speed by 2 knots (3.7 km/h; 2.3 mph), and probably having no deck gun installed. None of the Yu I-type submarines carried torpedoes or had torpedo tubes. Yu 1005 a unit of the Yu 1001 subclass.

Japan Steel Works (Nihon Seikojo) constructed Yu 1005 at its plant in Hiroshima, Japan. Records of the details of the construction of Yu 1005 have not been discovered, but the earliest Yu I-type submarines of the original Yu 1 subclass were laid down and launched during the latter half of 1943 and entered service at the end of 1943 or early in 1944.

== Service history ==
Yu 1005 spent her operational career in Japanese home waters. In January 1945, several Type I transport submarines were sent to operate from Shimoda on the southern tip of the Izu Peninsula in Shizuoka Prefecture on Honshu, and the submarines began transport missions from Shimoda in March 1945. Assigned to Detachment 2, Transport Submarine Group, on 13 February 1945, Yu 1005 made a round-trip supply voyage from Shimoda to Hachijō-jima in the Philippine Sea sometime during 1945.

World War II ended with the cessation of hostilities on 15 August 1945. Yu 1005 surrendered to the Allies later in August 1945. She subsequently either was scuttled or scrapped.
