= Japanese submarine Yu 1001 =

Imperial Japanese Army Yu 1-class submarine

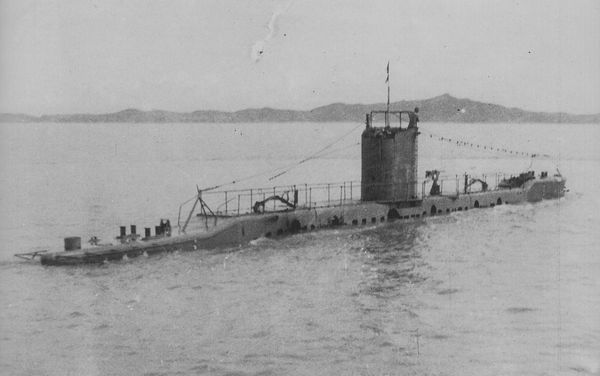
- An unidentified Yu I-type submarine of the Yu 1001 subclass in Tateyama Bay on the coast of Japan in 1945.

History

Japan
- Name: Yu 1001
- Builder: Japan Steel Works, Hiroshima, Japan
- Launched: 27 March 1944
- Completed: 15 June 1944
- Fate: Sunk 12 August 1945

General characteristics Yu I type
- Type: Transport submarine
- Displacement: 274 long tons (278 t) surfaced; 346 long tons (352 t) submerged
- Length: 41.40 m (135 ft 10 in) overall
- Beam: 3.90 m (12 ft 10 in)
- Draft: 3.00 m (9 ft 10 in)
- Propulsion: 2 × Hesselman engines; 298 kW (400 bhp) surfaced; 56 kW (75 shp) submerged; single shaft
- Speed: 10 knots (19 km/h; 12 mph) surfaced; 4 knots (7.4 km/h; 4.6 mph) submerged
- Range: 1,500 nmi (2,800 km; 1,700 mi) at 8 knots (15 km/h; 9.2 mph) surfaced; 32 nmi (59 km; 37 mi) at 4 knots (7.4 km/h; 4.6 mph) submerged
- Test depth: 100 m (328 ft)
- Capacity: 24 tons freight or 40 troops
- Complement: 23
- Armament: 1 × Type 4 37 mm shipboard gun; 2 × IJN Type 92 13 mm antiaircraft guns

Yu 1001 was an Imperial Japanese Army transport submarine, the lead unit of the Yu 1001 subclass of the Yu I type. Constructed for use during the latter stages of World War II, she served in the waters of the Japanese archipelago until sunk in the final days of the war.

== Construction ==
In the final two years of World War II, the Imperial Japanese Army constructed transport submarines — officially the Type 3 submergence transport vehicle and known to the Japanese Army as the Maru Yu — with which to supply its isolated island garrisons in the Pacific. Only submarines of the Yu I type were completed and saw service. The Yu I type was produced in four subclasses, each produced by a different manufacturer and differing primarily in the design of their conning towers and details of their gun armament, although one source states that the Yu 1001 subclass differed from the original Yu 1 sublcass in other ways, being longer, having a slightly larger displacement and more powerful diesel engine that increased the maximum speed by 2 knots (3.7 km/h; 2.3 mph), and probably having no deck gun installed. None of the Yu I-type submarines carried torpedoes or had torpedo tubes. Yu 1001 was the lead unit of the Yu 1001 subclass.

Japan Steel Works (Nihon Seikojo) constructed Yu 1001 at its plant in Hiroshima, Japan. She was launched on 27 March 1944 and completed on 15 June 1944.

== Service history ==
Yu 1001 spent her operational career in Japanese home waters. She was assigned to Detachment 2, Transport Submarine Group, in November 1944. In January 1945, several Type I transport submarines were sent to operate from Shimoda on the southern tip of the Izu Peninsula in Shizuoka Prefecture on Honshu, and the submarines began transport missions from Shimoda in March 1945. It is not clear when Yu 7 began operations from Shimoda, but she made a round-trip supply voyage from Shimoda to Hachijō-jima in the Philippine Sea sometime during 1945 as well as a round-trip supply voyage from the Army Transport Submarine Base on the Seto Inland Sea at Mishima in Ehime Prefecture on Shikoku to Ōshima Island in March 1945. U.S. aircraft sank her at Shimoda on 12 August 1945.
