= Japanese submarine Yu 3 =

Imperial Japanese Army Yu 1-class submarine

History

Japan
- Name: Yu 3
- Builder: Hitachi Kasado Works, Kudamatsu, Japan
- Laid down: 1943
- Launched: 1943
- Fate: Scuttled 5 January 1945; Refloated by United States Navy 18 January 1945; Probably scrapped or scuttled sometime after July 1945

General characteristics Yu I type
- Type: Transport submarine
- Displacement: 274 long tons (278 t) surfaced; 346 long tons (352 t) submerged
- Length: 41.40 m (135 ft 10 in) overall
- Beam: 3.90 m (12 ft 10 in)
- Draft: 3.00 m (9 ft 10 in)
- Propulsion: 2 × Hesselman engines; 298 kW (400 bhp) surfaced; 56 kW (75 shp) submerged; single shaft
- Speed: 10 knots (19 km/h; 12 mph) surfaced; 4 knots (7.4 km/h; 4.6 mph) submerged
- Range: 1,500 nmi (2,800 km; 1,700 mi) at 8 knots (15 km/h; 9.2 mph) surfaced; 32 nmi (59 km; 37 mi) at 4 knots (7.4 km/h; 4.6 mph) submerged
- Test depth: 100 m (328 ft)
- Capacity: 24 tons freight or 40 troops
- Complement: 23
- Armament: 1 × Type 4 37 mm shipboard gun; 5 × Type 99 light machine guns

Yu 3 was an Imperial Japanese Army transport submarine of the Yu 1 subclass of the Yu I type. Constructed for use during World War II, she participated in the Philippines campaign of 1944–1945, supplying Japanese forces in the Battle of Leyte, and was scuttled at the beginning of 1945.

== Construction ==
In the final two years of World War II, the Imperial Japanese Army constructed transport submarines — officially the Type 3 submergence transport vehicle and known to the Japanese Army as the Maru Yu — with which to supply its isolated island garrisons in the Pacific Ocean. Only submarines of the Yu I type were completed and saw service. The Yu I type was produced in four subclasses, each produced by a different manufacturer and differing primarily in the design of their conning towers and details of their gun armament. None carried torpedoes or had torpedo tubes. Yu 3 was of the Yu 1 subclass.

Yu 3 was laid down in 1943 by the itachi Kasado Works (Hitachi Kasado Seisakujo) at Kudamatsu, Japan. She was launched later in 1943.

== Service history ==
After her delivery to the Japanese Army, Yu 3 initially remained in Japanese home waters while the Army constructed additional submarines of her class and established a training program for their crews. In May 1944, the Army created its first submarine combat unit (jissen butai), the Manila Underwater Transport Detachment (Manira Sensuiyuso Hakentai), consisting of Yu 3, her sister ships Yu 1 and Yu 2, and a mother ship. The detachment got underway from Japan on either 28 or 30 May 1944 (according to different sources) bound for Manila on Luzon in the Philippines. The vessels had a difficult voyage which included a number of mechanical breakdowns, but finally arrived at Manila on 18 July 1944. After their arrival, the three submarines underwent repairs and thorough overhauls.

On 20 October 1944, United States Army forces landed on Leyte, beginning both the Battle of Leyte and the broader Philippines campaign of 1944–1945. In November 1944, all three submarines got underway on their first supply run to Leyte. Yu 2 never arrived, but Yu 1 and Yu 3 reached Ormoc on Leyte's west coast on 27 November 1944 and discharged a combined 600 bags of white rice, 50 boxes of field rations, and 300 boxes of radio batteries.

In December 1944, Yu 1 and Yu 3 were sent to San Fernando on the northwest coast of Luzon. On 5 January 1945, while Yu 3 was transporting a cargo which consisted mostly of large bags of rice and bundles of welding rods for the Luzon garrison, U.S. aircraft attacked her in Lingayen Gulf, and she ran aground. Her crew scuttled her just off Damortis and abandoned her.

== Later history ==
U.S. Army forces landed on the coast of Luzon in Lingayen Gulf on 9 January 1945, and shortly afterward U.S. forces found Yu 3 lying awash in shallow water just off Damortis. After United States Seventh Fleet personnel of the Seventh Fleet Intelligence Center inspected the wreck, the United States Navy decided to salvage Yu 3. The U.S. Navy rescue and salvage ship USS Grasp (ARS-24) refloated her on 18 January 1945, and she was towed across Lingayen Gulf to Sual. U.S. personnel examined her there, finding her cargo still aboard and no sign of any battle damage. Yu 3 subsequently was loaded aboard the dock landing ship USS Rushmore (LSD-14), which transported her to the United States in May 1945. By no later than early June 1945 Yu 3 was at Mare Island Navy Yard in Vallejo, California.

An article in the 8 June 1945 issue of the Mare Island Navy Yard's newspaper, The Grapevine, described Yu 3 as a 137-foot (42 m), 280-ton Japanese "cargo-carrying submarine" of crude construction powered by two six-cylinder diesel engines. The article said that she had no interior bulkheads and that her periscope operated by counterweights, and so could be raised only 3 feet (0.9 m). An article in the 22 June 1945 issue of The Grapevine identified her as Yu 3 and reported that the navy yard was offering tours of her and selling parts from her to raise money for war bonds. She subsequently probably was either scrapped or scuttled, sometime after early July 1945.
