= Japanese submarine Yu 1 =

Imperial Japanese Army Yu 1-class submarine

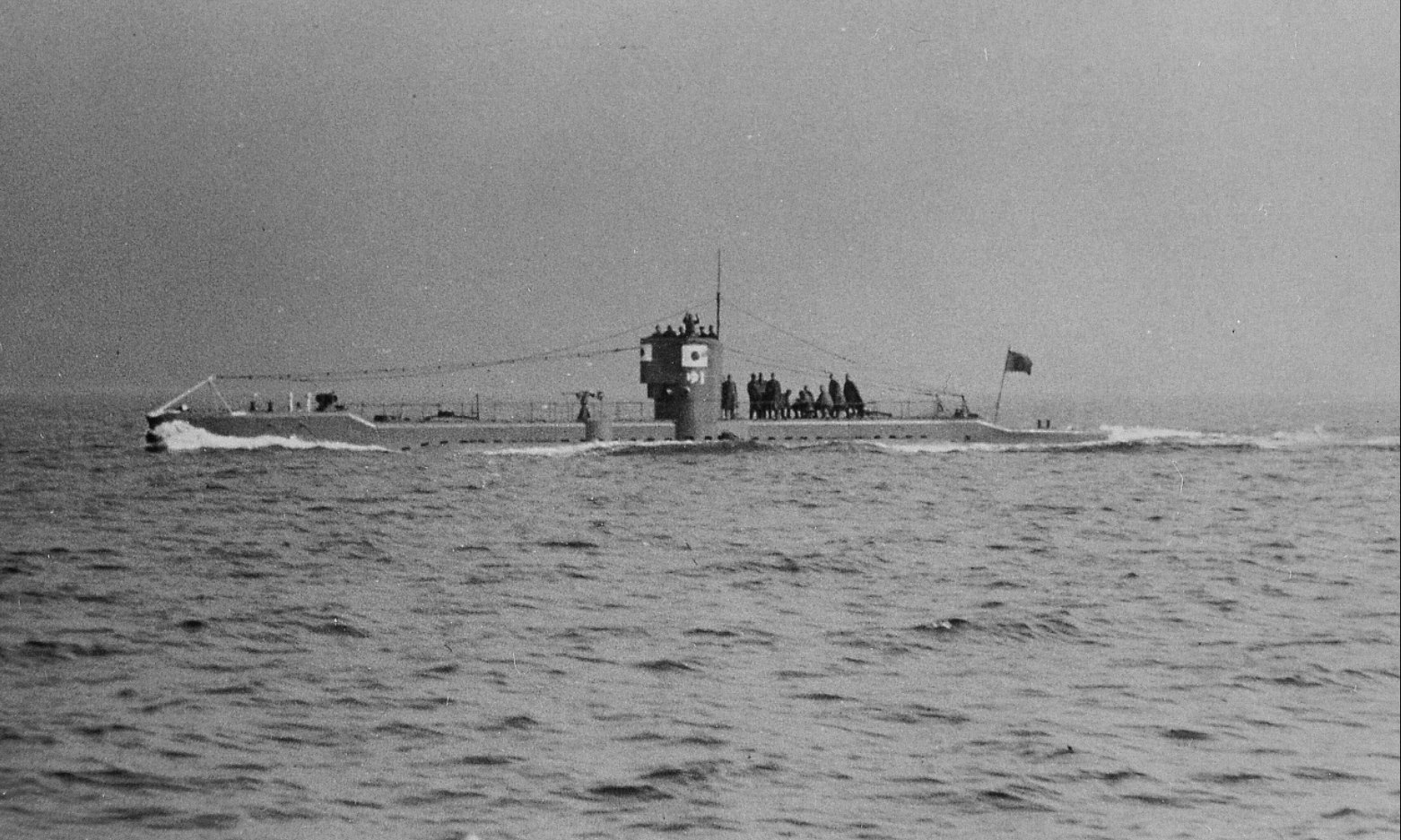
- Yu 1 underway off Japan sometime between late 1943 and May 1944.

History

Japan
- Name: Yu 1
- Builder: Hitachi Kasado Works, Kudamatsu, Japan
- Laid down: 23 June 1943
- Launched: 16 or 29 October 1943
- Acquired: Between 22 and 31 December 1943
- Fate: Sunk 2 January 1945

General characteristics Yu I type
- Type: Transport submarine
- Displacement: 274 long tons (278 t) surfaced; 346 long tons (352 t) submerged
- Length: 41.40 m (135 ft 10 in) overall
- Beam: 3.90 m (12 ft 10 in)
- Draft: 3.00 m (9 ft 10 in)
- Propulsion: 2 × Hesselman engines; 298 kW (400 bhp) surfaced; 56 kW (75 shp) submerged; single shaft
- Speed: 10 knots (19 km/h; 12 mph) surfaced; 4 knots (7.4 km/h; 4.6 mph) submerged
- Range: 1,500 nmi (2,800 km; 1,700 mi) at 8 knots (15 km/h; 9.2 mph) surfaced; 32 nmi (59 km; 37 mi) at 4 knots (7.4 km/h; 4.6 mph) submerged
- Test depth: 100 m (328 ft)
- Capacity: 24 tons freight or 40 troops
- Complement: 23
- Armament: 1 × Type 4 37 mm shipboard gun; 5 × Type 99 light machine guns

Yu 1 was an Imperial Japanese Army transport submarine, the lead vessel of the Yu 1 subclass of the Yu I type. Constructed for use during World War II and entering service in the last days of 1943, she participated in the Philippines campaign of 1944–1945, supplying Japanese forces in the Battle of Leyte, and was sunk at the beginning of 1945.

== Construction ==
In the final two years of World War II, the Imperial Japanese Army constructed transport submarines — officially the Type 3 submergence transport vehicle and known to the Japanese Army as the Maru Yu — with which to supply its isolated island garrisons in the Pacific Ocean. Only submarines of the Yu I type were completed and saw service. The Yu I type was produced in four subclasses, each produced by a different manufacturer and differing primarily in the design of their conning towers and details of their gun armament. None carried torpedoes or had torpedo tubes. Yu 1 was both the first Maru Yu submarine constructed and the lead unit of the Yu 1 subclass.

Yu 1 was laid down on 23 June 1943 by the Hitachi Kasado Works (Hitachi Kasado Seisakujo) at Kudamatsu, Japan. She was launched on either 16 or 29 October 1943 (according to different sources) and delivered to the Imperial Japanese Army sometime between 22 and 31 December 1943.

== Service history ==
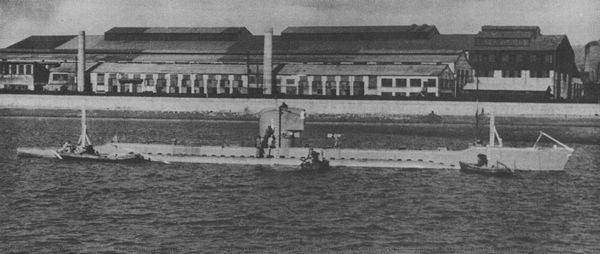
Yu 1 in 1944.

Yu 1 initially remained in Japanese home waters while the Japanese Army constructed additional submarines of her class and established a training program for their crews. In May 1944, the Army created its first submarine combat unit (jissen butai), the Manila Underwater Transport Detachment (Manira Sensuiyuso Hakentai), consisting of Yu 1, her sister ships Yu 2 and Yu 3, and a mother ship. The detachment got underway from Japan on either 28 or 30 May 1944 (according to different sources) bound for Manila on Luzon in the Philippines. The vessels had a difficult voyage which included a number of mechanical breakdowns, but finally arrived at Manila on 18 July 1944. After their arrival, the three submarines underwent repairs and thorough overhauls.

On 20 October 1944, United States Army forces landed on Leyte, beginning both the Battle of Leyte and the broader Philippines campaign of 1944–1945. In November 1944, all three submarines got underway on their first supply run to Leyte. Yu 2 never arrived, but Yu 1 and Yu 3 reached Ormoc on Leyte's west coast on 27 November 1944 and discharged a combined 600 bags of white rice, 50 boxes of field rations, and 300 boxes of radio batteries.

In December 1944, Yu 1 and Yu 3 were sent to San Fernando on the northwest coast of Luzon. On 2 January 1945, U.S. aircraft surprised Yu 1 on the surface and sank her in Lingayen Gulf just off Port Poro on Luzon's coast.
