= Japanese submarine Yu 3001 =

Imperial Japanese Army Yu 3001-class submarine

History

Japan
- Name: Yu 3001
- Builder: Korea Machine Factory Boat Manufacturing Works, Inchon, Chosen (Korea)
- Launched: 10 April 1944
- Acquired: 2 August 1944
- Fate: Surrendered August 1945; Scuttled or scrapped

General characteristics Yu I type
- Type: Transport submarine
- Displacement: 274 long tons (278 t) surfaced; 346 long tons (352 t) submerged
- Length: 41.40 m (135 ft 10 in) overall
- Beam: 3.90 m (12 ft 10 in)
- Draft: 3.00 m (9 ft 10 in)
- Propulsion: 2 × Hesselman engines; 300 kW (400 bhp) surfaced; 56 kW (75 shp) submerged; single shaft
- Speed: 10 knots (19 km/h; 12 mph) surfaced; 4 knots (7.4 km/h; 4.6 mph) submerged
- Range: 1,500 nmi (2,800 km; 1,700 mi) at 8 knots (15 km/h; 9.2 mph) surfaced; 32 nmi (59 km; 37 mi) at 4 knots (7.4 km/h; 4.6 mph) submerged
- Test depth: 100 m (328 ft)
- Capacity: 24 tons freight or 40 troops
- Complement: 23
- Armament: 1 x deck gun

Yu 3001 was an Imperial Japanese Army transport submarine, the lead vessel of the Yu 3001 subclass of the Yu I type. Constructed for use during World War II and entering service in 1944, she suffered damage in a friendly fire incident during her maiden voyage which restricted her to use as a training submarine.

== Construction ==
In the final two years of World War II, the Imperial Japanese Army constructed transport submarines — officially the Type 3 submergence transport vehicle and known to the Japanese Army as the Maru Yu — with which to supply its isolated island garrisons in the Pacific. Only submarines of the Yu I type were completed and saw service. The Yu I type was produced in four subclasses, each produced by a different manufacturer and differing primarily in the design of their conning towers and details of their gun armament. None carried torpedoes or had torpedo tubes. Yu 3001 was the lead unit of the Yu 3001 subclass.

Yu 3001 was launched on 10 April 1944 by the Korea Machine Factory Boat Manufacturing Works (Chosen Kikan Seisakujo Jinsen Kojo Seizotai) at Inchon in Chosen, the Japanese name for Korea while Korea was under Japanese rule. She was delivered to the Imperial Japanese Army on 2 August 1944.

One source claims the North Korea Machine Works (Kikai Seisakujo) at Wonsan, Korea, built all submarines of the Yu 3001 subclass.

== Service history ==
After her delivery, Yu 3001 spent about a month training in the vicinity of Inchon. On 8 September 1944, she got underway from Inchon and headed south along the west coast of the Korean Peninsula, bound for the main Imperial Japanese Army transport submarine base, located on the Seto Inland Sea at Mishima in Ehime Prefecture on Shikoku in Japan. On the evening of 8 September, she anchored for the night in the shadow of an island off Kunsan, Korea.

Around midnight on 8–9 September, a lookout on the quarterdeck of the Japanese NYK Line 882-gross register ton Type 2E cargo ship SS Izu Maru — an unarmed merchant ship making a voyage from Wakamatsu, Kyushu, Japan, to Dairen, Manchukuo — sighted Yu 3001 at a range of 1,500 meters (1,640 yd). Izu Maru′s captain, Seinoshin Hiyama, consulted a recognition manual and found that Yu 3001′s silhouette did not match that of any Imperial Japanese Navy submarine. Unaware of the Imperial Japanese Army submarine force, which was not included in the manual, Hiyama concluded that Yu 3001 was an enemy submarine and ordered Izu Maru to ram her. Working up to maximum speed, Izu Maru made a 180-degree turn and headed toward Yu 3001.

The watch on duty on Yu 3001′s conning tower sighted the approaching Izu Maru and assumed she would alter course and pass clear of their submarine, only realizing that she would collide with Yu 3001 when it was too late to take any action to avoid it. Izu Maru rammed Yu 3001 on her port side amidships, tearing a large hole in the submarine's No. 4 tank, cracking her pressure hull, knocking out her lights, and increasing her stern draft by 20 centimeters (8 in). The men aboard Yu 3001 escaped serious injury except for an Imperial Japanese Army captain — the navigation officer of the Army Transport Submarine Detachment Headquarters at Inchon, aboard Yu 3001 as a passenger — who suffered painful facial burns when caustic soda hit him. As Izu Maru backed away, her crew heard men aboard Yu 3001 shouting "Friend!" Realizing his ship had attacked a Japanese submarine, Hiyama launched Izu Maru′s lifeboat, which rowed to Yu 3001, arriving alongside her 20 minutes after the collision to render assistance.

Her bow damaged in the collision, Izu Maru proceeded to Kunsan for repairs. At Kunsan, the Japanese Army's military police — the Kenpeitai — questioned Hiyama about his collision with Yu 3001 and established the schedule for the following investigation of the incident. When Izu Maru arrived at Moji, Japan, Hiyama appeared before a naval staff officer investigating the matter, who surprised Hiyama by praising him for his courageous attack with his small, unarmed merchant ship on what he thought was an enemy submarine.

Meanwhile, Army Shipping Headquarters at Ujina in Hiroshima, Japan, ordered the damaged Yu 3001 to make a stop at Ruisei (the Japanese name for Yosu, or Yeosu, Korea) and then proceed to Pusan, Korea, for repairs. As she headed southward along the west coast of Korea, an Imperial Japanese Navy plane passed over Yu 3001, lost power, and ditched; Yu 3001 rescued its pilot from the water. When she reached the southwest coast of Korea, she sighted a northbound Japanese convoy, and one of the convoy's escorts mistook her for an enemy submarine and suddenly opened gunfire on her. One round landed 500 meters (550 yd) ahead of Yu 3001 and a second 700 meters (770 yd) astern and to starboard of her before she identified herself as Japanese and the escort ceased fire and continued northward.

After making her stop at Ruisei on Korea's south coast, Yu 3001 continued to Pusan on Korea's southeast coast, which she reached on 18 September 1944. She entered drydock there, where her No. 4 tank was repaired. The crack in her pressure hull was too severe for a proper repair, however, and after repairs to the crack her diving depth was restricted, preventing her from ever reaching her designed diving depth of 100 meters (328 ft) again.

When her repairs were complete, Yu 3001 got underway from Pusan to complete her voyage to Mishima, which she finally reached on 10 October 1944. The diving depth limitation imposed by her pressure hull damage restricted her thereafter to use as a training submarine at the Mishima Army Transport Submarine Base. She was at Mishima when World War II ended with the cessation of hostilities on 15 August 1945.

Yu 3001 surrendered to the Allies later in August 1945. She subsequently either was scuttled or scrapped.
