= Tsukishima =

Town located in Chūō-ku, Tokyo

Coordinates: 35.662849°N 139.782658°E

Eitai Bridge and Tsukuda Island 1835 print by Hiroshige. Tsukishima was created behind the island.

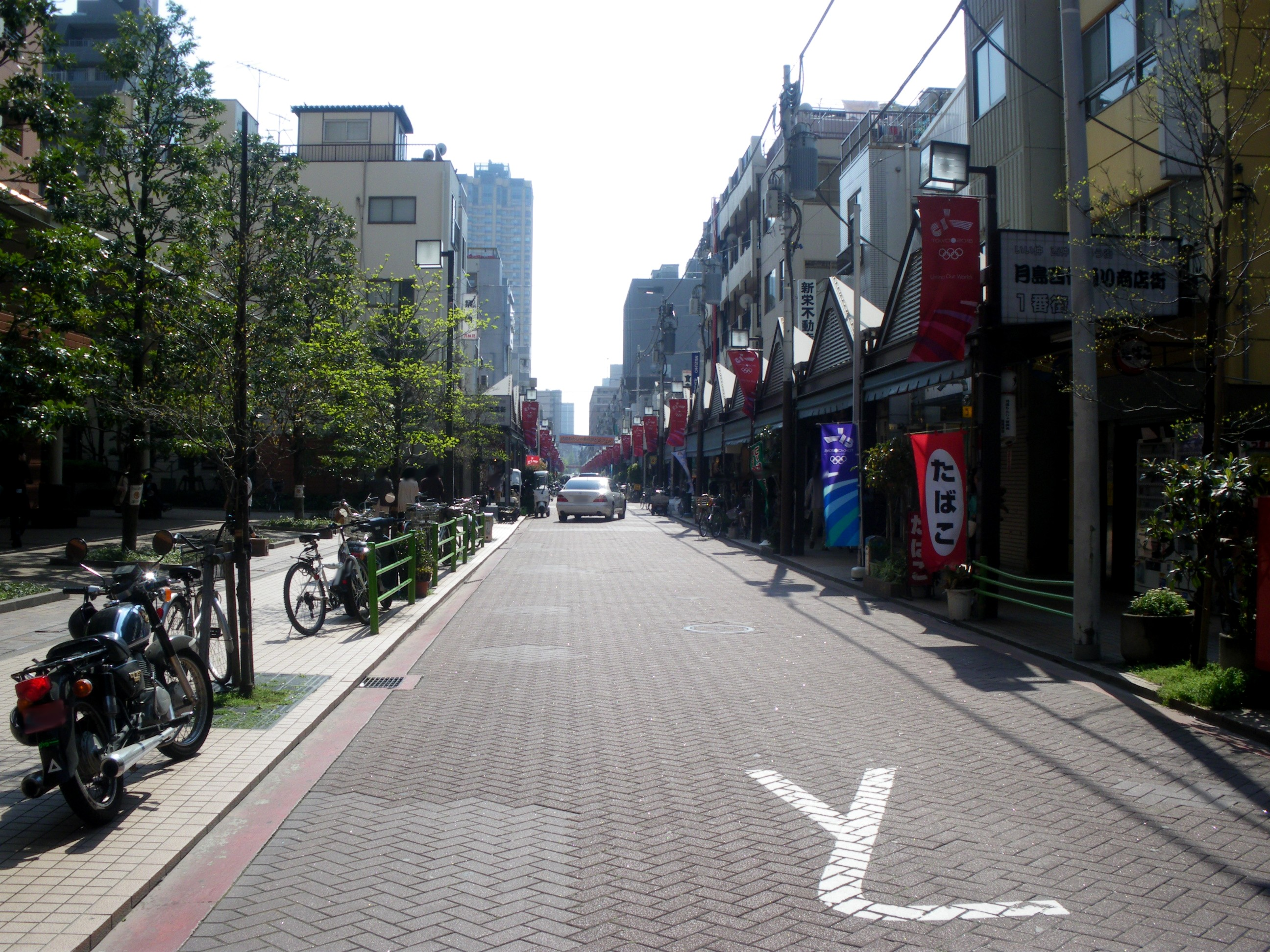
Monja Street, known as the "Home of Monjayaki"

Tsukishima (月島, Japanese pronunciation: [tsɯ̥.kʲi.ɕi.ma]) is a place located in Chūō, Tokyo, Japan, in the Sumida River estuary. It is a reclaimed land next to Tsukuda District. The land reclamation completed in 1892, using earth from the dredging work performed to create a shipping channel in Tokyo Bay. At this time, it was designated as industrial area in accordance with the Fukoku Kyōhei National Policy.

Originally, Tsukuda Island was a tiny island at the river mouth. It was inhabited by a fishing community who migrated from Osaka in early 1600s. The original Tsukuda island now is home to the exclusive tower mansion and park complex Rivercity 21.

It has been said that the name (literally "moon island") was originally written using the characters 築島 which can also be read "Tsukishima" but mean "constructed island".

It is currently known for its large number of restaurants serving the local specialty, monjayaki.

Tsukishima Station is served by the Tokyo Metro Yūrakuchō Line and the Toei Subway Ōedo Line.

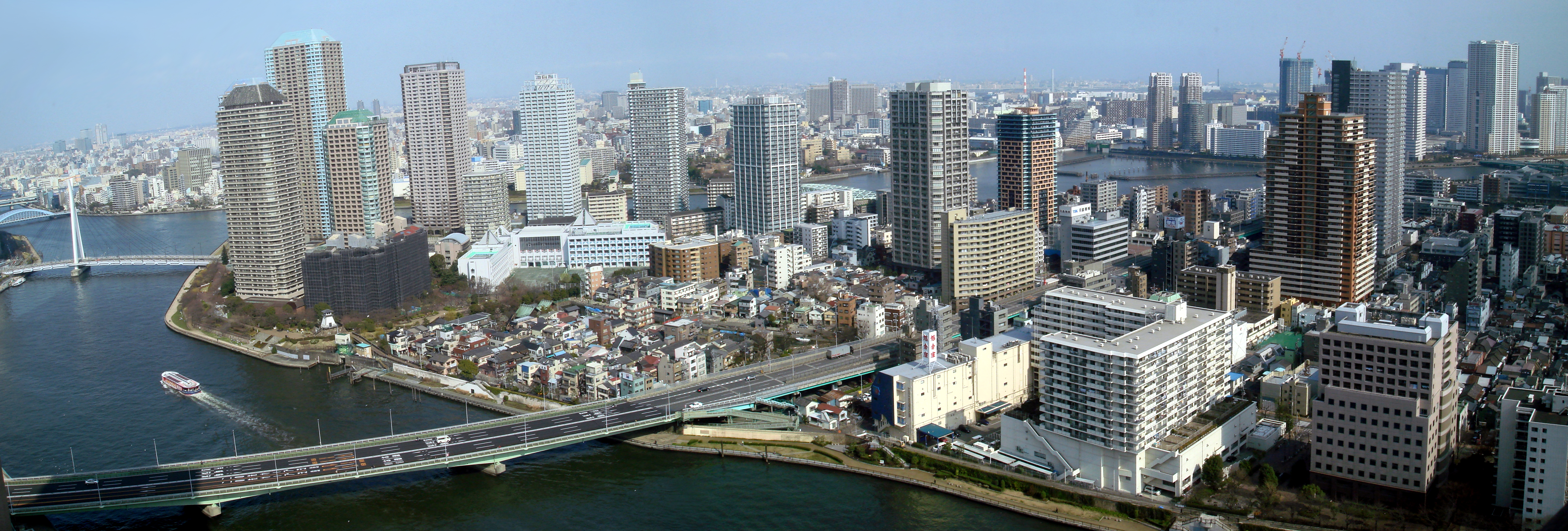
Upper portion of Tsukishima (island neighborhood). The Sumida River crosses in the foreground; the bridge on the bottom left is the Tsukuda Bridge (Tsukuda Ohashi), above that is the white Chuo Bridge (Chuo Ohashi), and above that the blue Eitai Bridge (Eitai-bashi).

== Education ==
Public elementary and junior high schools are operated by Chuo City Board of Education.

Zoned elementary schools include:

- Tsukudajima Elementary School (佃島小学校)'s boundary includes portions of 1-chome
- Tsukishima Daiichi (Tsukishima No. 1) Elementary School (月島第一小学校)'s boundary includes all of 3-chome and portions of 1, 2, and 4-chome
- Tsukishima Daisan (Tsukishima No. 3) Elementary School (月島第三小学校)'s boundary includes portions of 2 and 4-chome

Zoned junior high schools include:

- Tsukuda Junior High School (佃中学校)'s boundary includes all of 1 and 3-chome and portions of 2 and 4-chome
- Harumi Junior High School (晴海中学校)'s boundary includes portions of 2 and 4-chome

== Notable residents ==
- Masami Kurumada
