= Saint Ingemo Fountain =

Coordinates: 58°16′3.13″N 13°51′1.31″E

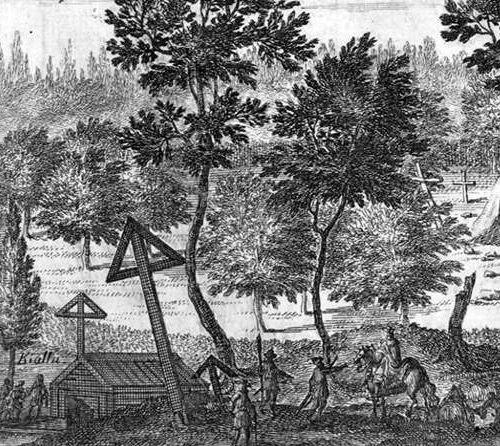
Ingemo Fountain and the sacred grove in a 1705 engraving

Saint Ingemo Fountain was a sacrificial source and fountain of devotion in the Swedish province of Västergötland, located between Skövde and Tidaholm.

The cult of Saint Ingemo is certified only since the time of the Protestant Reformation. Her canonization has never taken place and that the Church has never ranked her among the official saints. Nothing is known of her life.

This is a speculation that her name was Ingamoder which means "mother of Inge" (King Inge of Sweden).

== Bibliography ==
- Wilhelmina Stålberg, Notepad on swedish women, S: ta Ingemo 1864.
- Carl Henrik Martling, A chronicle about swedish saints In 2001 ISBN 91 7580 201-5
- National Heritage, Dala object 113: 1
