= Automotive industry in Sweden =

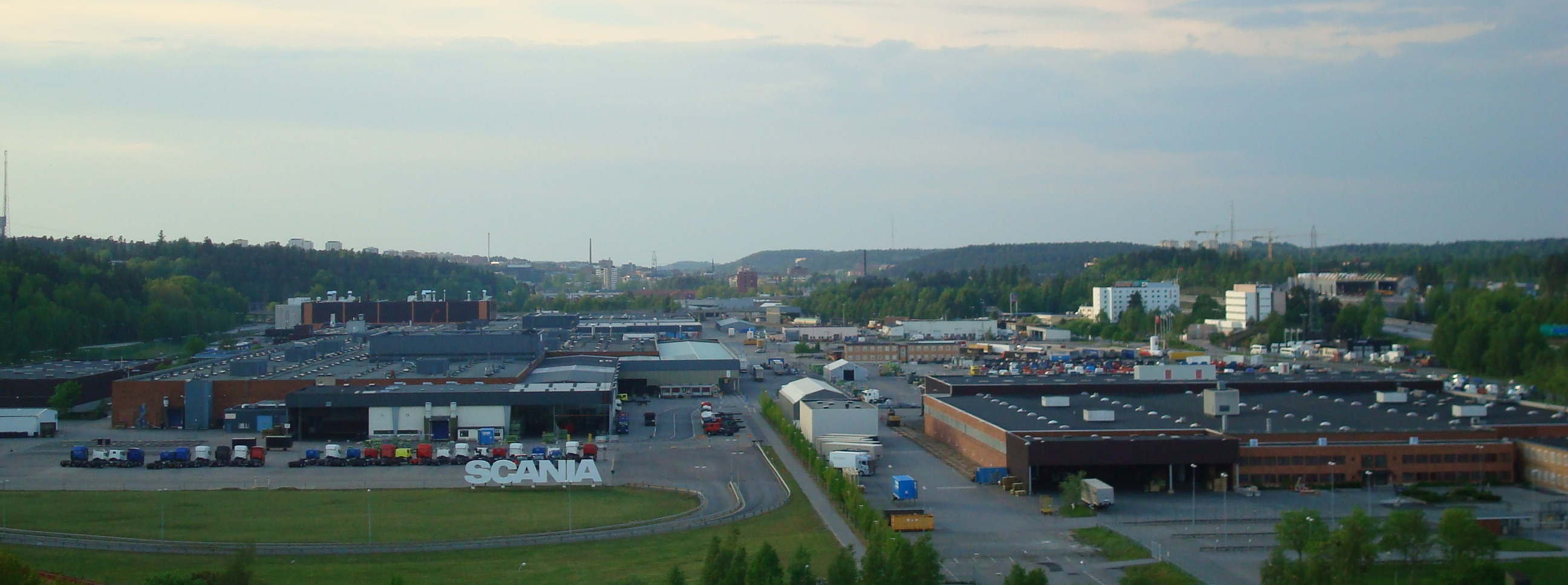
Scania's truck plant in Södertälje.

The automotive industry in Sweden is mainly associated with passenger car manufacturers Volvo Cars and Saab Automobile but Sweden is also home of two of the largest truck manufacturers in the world: AB Volvo and Scania AB. The automotive industry is heavily dependent on export as some 85 percent of the passenger cars and 95 percent of the heavy vehicles are sold outside of Sweden. The automotive industry and its sub-contractors is a major part of Swedish industry. In 2011 around 110,000 people were employed and the export income of 150 billion SEK accounted for 12 per cent of Sweden's export income. During 2009 128,738 passenger cars and 27,698 heavy vehicles were built in Sweden. Koenigsegg is also a famous Swedish company which makes some of the fastest cars in the world, but also some of the most expensive. They currently produce models such as the Jesko, Gemera, and CC850.

== History ==
=== Up to 1918 ===
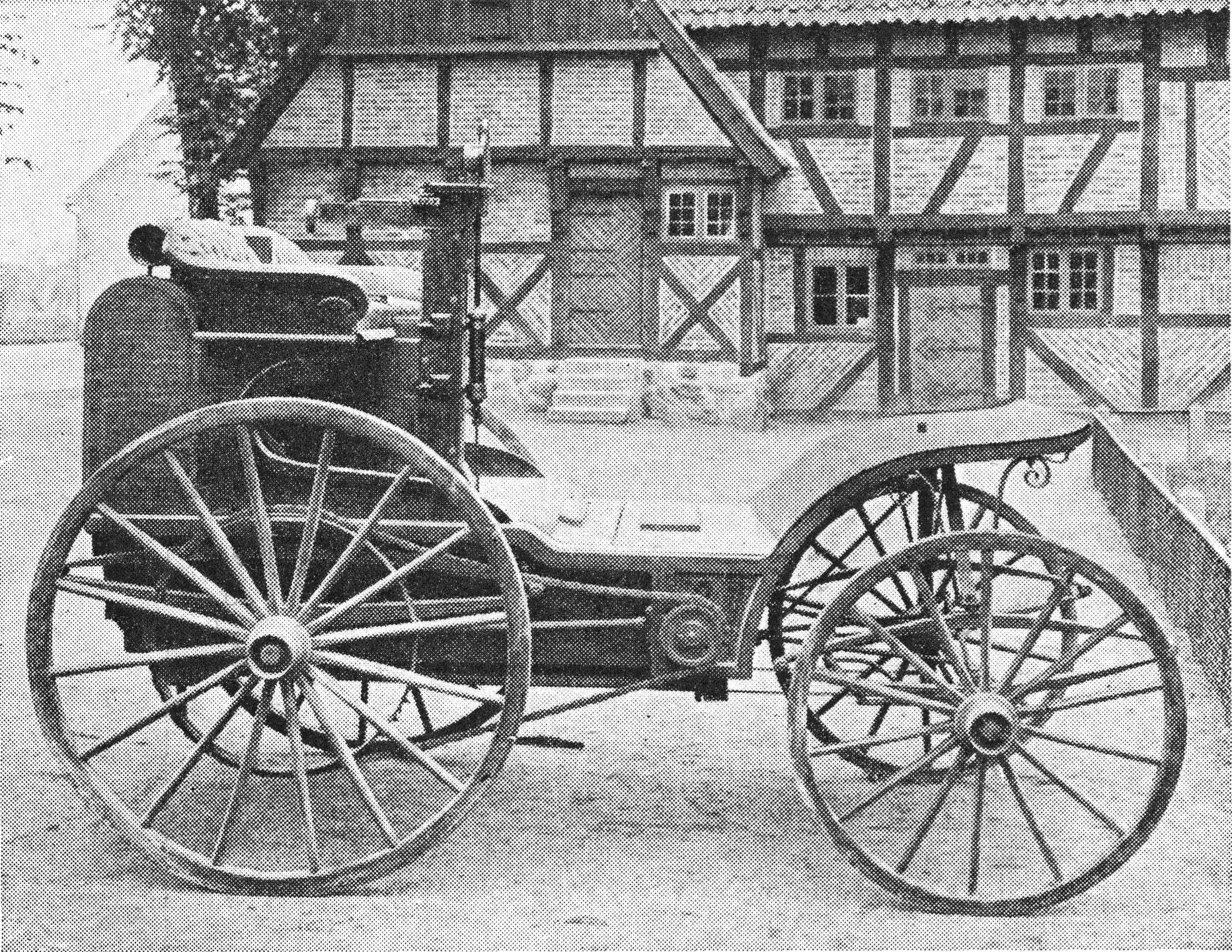
Cederholm #2, built in 1894.

The first Swedish automobile was a steam car built in 1891-92 by brothers Jöns and Anders Cederholm. They planned to use it for transportation between their home in Ystad and their summer house outside town. The automobile was destroyed in Sweden's first automobile accident but the Cederholm brothers soon built a second, improved version of their steam car reusing many parts from the first one. The car is preserved in a museum in Skurup.

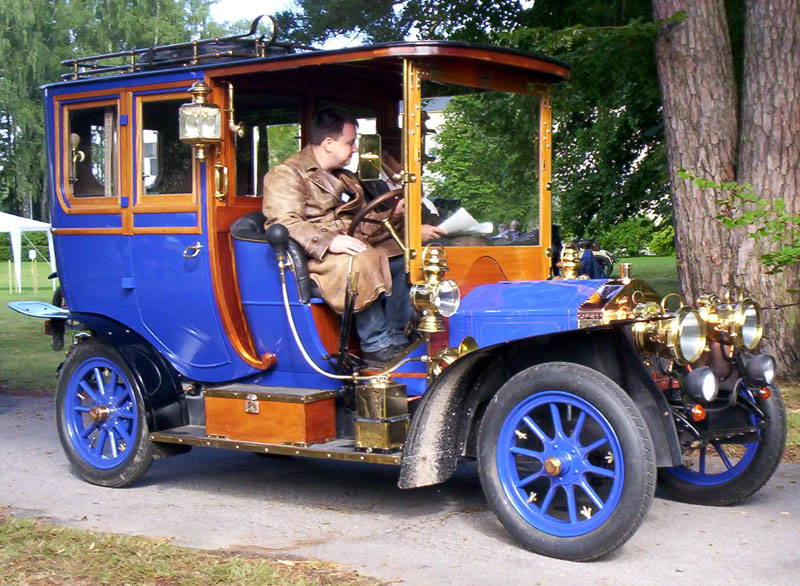
1909 Vabis.

In 1898 Gustaf Erikson at Surahammars Bruk built an automobile with an internal combustion engine for Vabis in Södertälje. Erikson continuously improved his car until Vabis was satisfied, and started production of automobiles and trucks in 1902.

Harald Håkansson built the first electric car in Sweden on behalf of AB Atlas in 1900. The project never went beyond this single prototype.

The bicycle manufacturer Maskinfabriks-aktiebolaget Scania in Malmö started producing automobiles and trucks in 1902. The company amalgamated with Vabis in 1911, creating Scania-Vabis. The new company concentrated their production of automobiles and light trucks to Södertälje while the Malmö plant built heavy trucks.

In 1903, Tidaholms Bruk built a truck called Tor. After a second Tor prototype the company started production on a larger scale under the name Tidaholm. Tidaholm built a small number of automobiles but their main products were heavy trucks and buses.

Åtvidabergs Vagnfabrik used an American high wheeler as model for their automobile in 1910. This vehicle was so outdated Åtvidaberg did not manage to sell more than 12 of them. The rest of the cars were turned into draisines for railroad inspection.

=== 1919 to 1945 ===
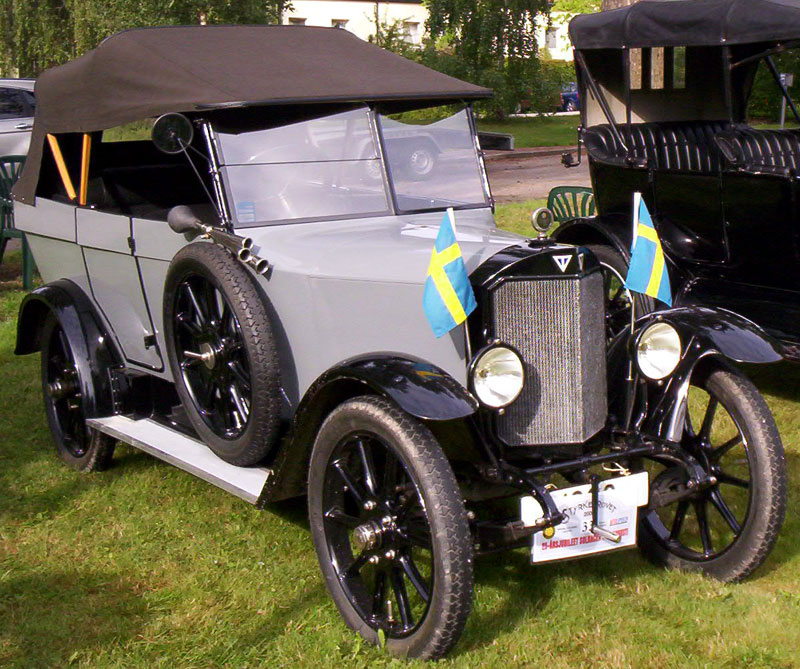
1920 Thulin A.

Swedish aircraft manufacturer AB Thulinverken in Landskrona started building automobiles in 1920. The car was based on a design from German manufacturer AGA. The production was limited and when Volvo started production in 1927 Thulin left the automobile industry after some 500 cars had been built.

In 1921 Scania-Vabis went bankrupt. After reconstruction the company decided to abandon passenger car production and close their plant in Malmö and focus on truck production in Södertälje. The situation got better when Scania-Vabis received a large order for buses from the Swedish postal service. The large and powerful Scania-Vabis trucks were also used for snow removal and other road maintenance work in Sweden.

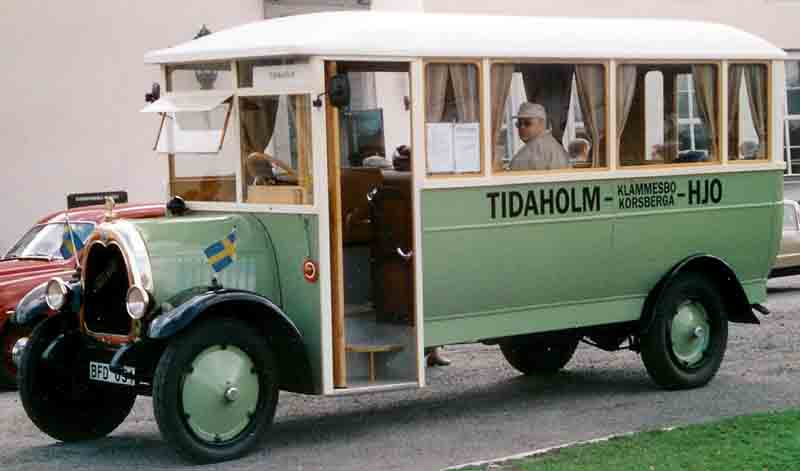
1925 Tidaholm bus.

In the 1920s Ford Motor Company and General Motors opened assembly plants in Sweden. Chrysler Corporation cooperated with Svenska Bilfabriken AB. Ford's factory in Stockholm was active until mid-1950s.

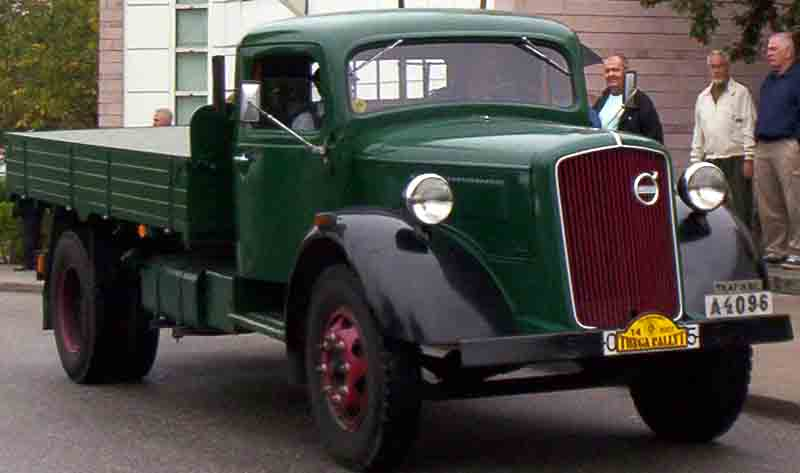
1940 Volvo LV192 truck.

Volvo started production of passenger cars and light trucks in Gothenburg in 1927, backed by ball bearing manufacturer SKF. Production of passenger cars was limited during the first decades but the trucks were successful and kept the company profitable.

During the Great Depression Tidaholm started losing money and finally halted vehicle production in 1934. Some 850 vehicles had been manufactured since 1903.

AB Nyköpings Automobilfabrik (ANA) started licence assembly in 1937, first from American Chrysler Corporation and later on from European companies like Standard Motor Company and Simca. Car assembly stopped when Saab bought ANA in 1960.

=== 1946 to 1970 ===
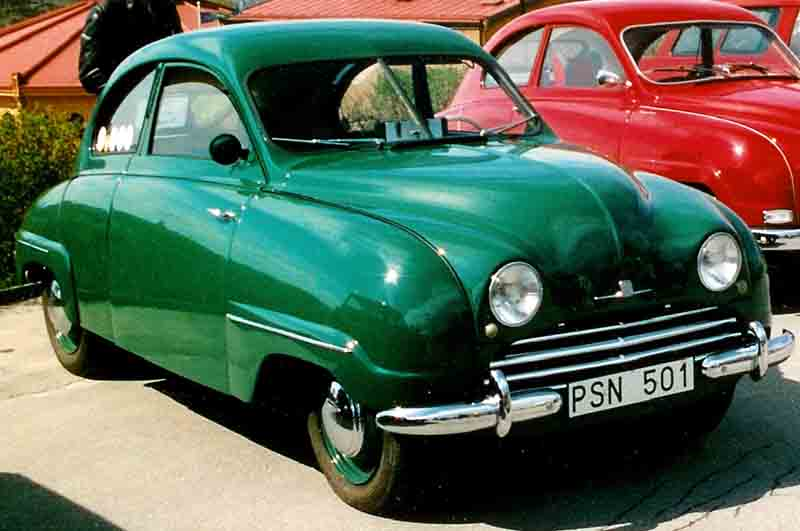
1951 Saab 92.

After the Second World War, military aircraft manufacturer Saab AB started looking for a civilian product to fill their workshops. The answer was passenger cars. Production of the small Saab automobile started in Trollhättan in 1949. The powertrain with a two-stroke engine and front-wheel drive resembled the German DKW which was popular in Sweden before the war, while the unibody showed influence from the aircraft industry.

Both Volvo and Scania-Vabis begun exporting their trucks in the 1930s but it wasn't until the 1950s volumes started rising. Like other Swedish products the trucks were needed in the rebuilding of Europe after the war. By the end of the decade Volvo and Saab, like the rest of the European automobile industry, started exporting their passenger cars to the vast American market.

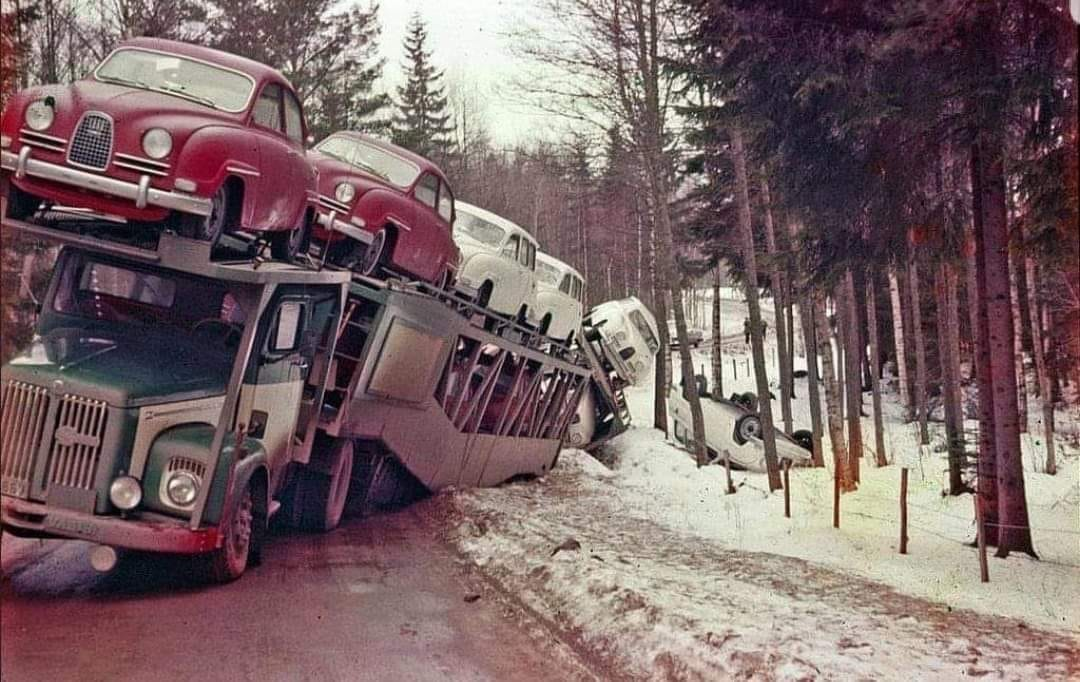
A Scania-Vabis L55 and some Saab 93s around 1960.

Volvo and Saab were successful in rallying in the 1960s. Saabs successes with their top driver Erik Carlsson in the Monte Carlo Rally and the RAC Rally opened up a new market for the small automobile maker in the United Kingdom. The US and Britain would remain virtually the sole export markets for Saab, which in the end would prove fatal for production volume.

Between 1969 and 1971 Kalmar Verkstad produced a purpose-built vehicle for the Swedish postal service called Tjorven. Kalmar Verkstad also experimented with a semi-trailer truck, but this project never materialized.

In 1969 the Wallenberg family merged their aircraft and automobile manufacturer Saab with their truck manufacturer Scania-Vabis into one company, called Saab-Scania. One and a half year earlier the truck manufacturer dropped the Vabis name and their products have since then been sold under the name Scania only.

=== 1971 to 2000 ===
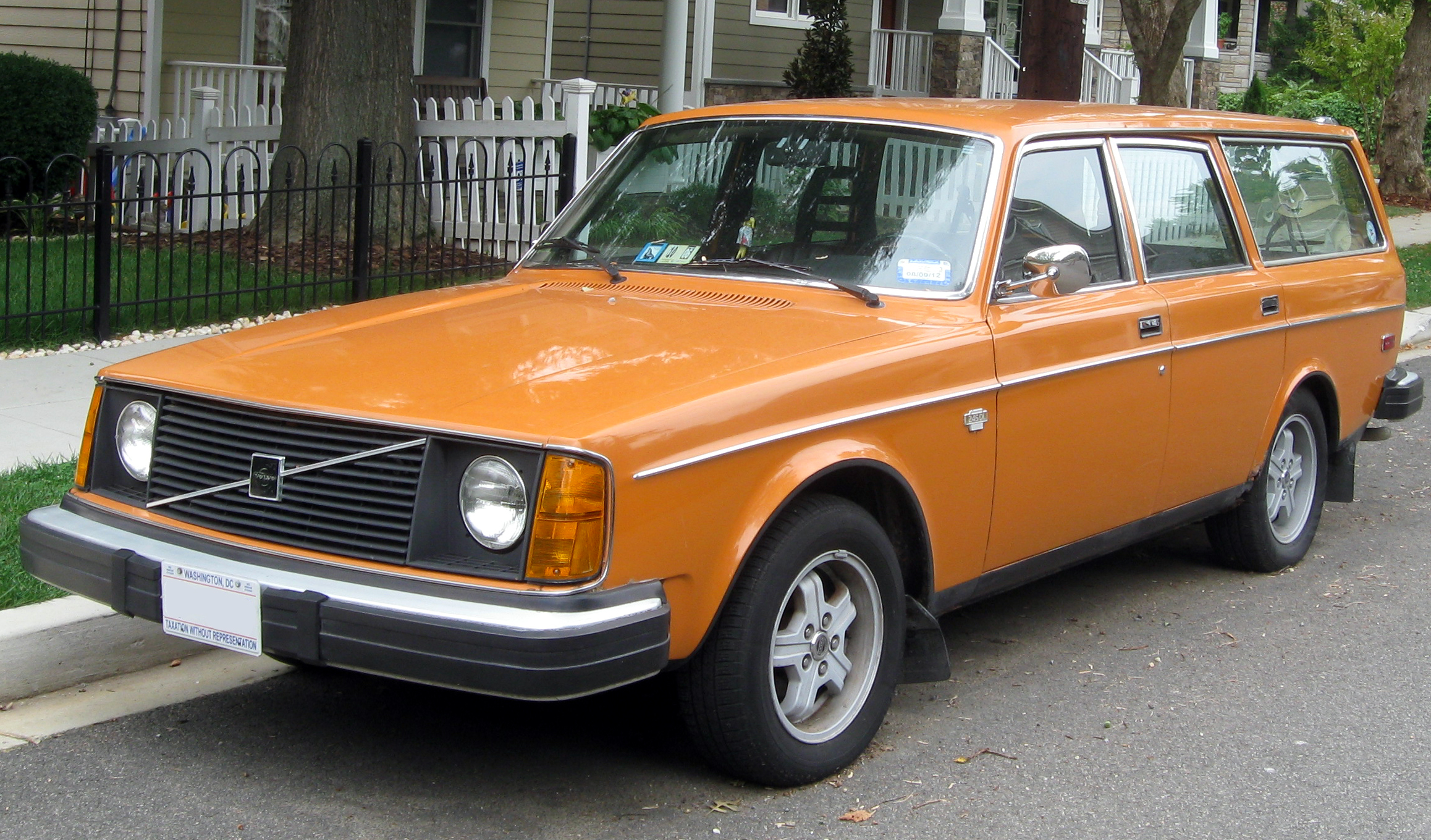
Volvo 245, the archetype of the Swedish automobile.

During the general decline of the automotive industry following the 1973 oil crisis, Volvo and Saab-Scania felt they were too small to survive on their own in the long run. In 1977 plans were presented on a merger between the two companies. The plan eventually fell apart due to resistance from Saab-Scania's shareholders.

Volvo launched an important new model, the 300 series hatchback, in 1976, which sold well in Sweden and in many other parts of Europe, including the United Kingdom, where it was the best selling foreign car in 1982 and remained among the most popular imports there for the rest of the decade. The 300 was initially only available as a three-door hatchback with automatic transmission, but the range of body styles soon expanded to include a five-door hatchback and a four-door saloon, as well as manual transmission becoming available along with a wider range of engines. It continued in production until 1991, some four years after the launch of the Volvo 440/460 which was intended to replace it.

The mid-range 200 Series saloons and estates were hugely popular from their launch in 1974, and continued until 1993, two years after the launch of its front-wheel-drive replacement, the Volvo 850. There was also a coupe version of the Volvo 200, the 262, but most examples were sold in the US.

The top-of-the-range Volvo 700 Series saloon and estate, launched in 1982, was a popular choice in the sector of the market dominated across Europe by the likes of BMW and Mercedes-Benz.

The Saab 900, launched in 1979 to compete with conventional European family cars like the Ford Cortina/Taunus and Renault 18 as well as the more upmarket BMW 3 Series, was a strong seller throughout the 1980s, and Saab strengthened its position at the top end of the market in 1985 with the launch of the larger 9000.

In 1989 the Wallenberg group finally found a partner for Saab in General Motors. Automobile production was placed in a new company called Saab Automobile which was owned by 50 percent each by Investor AB and General Motors.

In 1993 Volvo presented plans for a merger with French automaker Renault. The merger was never completed due to resistance from Volvo's shareholders but it ended up with Volvo taking control of Renault's truck division RVI and Renault becoming a major shareholder in Volvo.

During the 1990s a couple of sports car manufacturers popped up in Sweden as a bright contrast to the safe and sensible automobiles associated with Volvo and Saab. Koenigsegg was founded in Ängelholm in 1994 and between 1996 and 1998 Jösse Car in Arvika built some 40 Indigo 3000 roadsters, mainly using existing parts from Volvo.

In 1999 Volvo sold its passenger car division Volvo Cars to Ford Motor Company. Volvo intended to use the money they got from the deal to buy Scania from the Wallenberg group, but the plans fell on the European Union's anti-trust legislation stating this would give Volvo close to monopoly in Scandinavia.

=== 2001–present ===
In 2001 General Motors took over Investor AB's share in Saab Automobile, taking full control over its subsidiary.

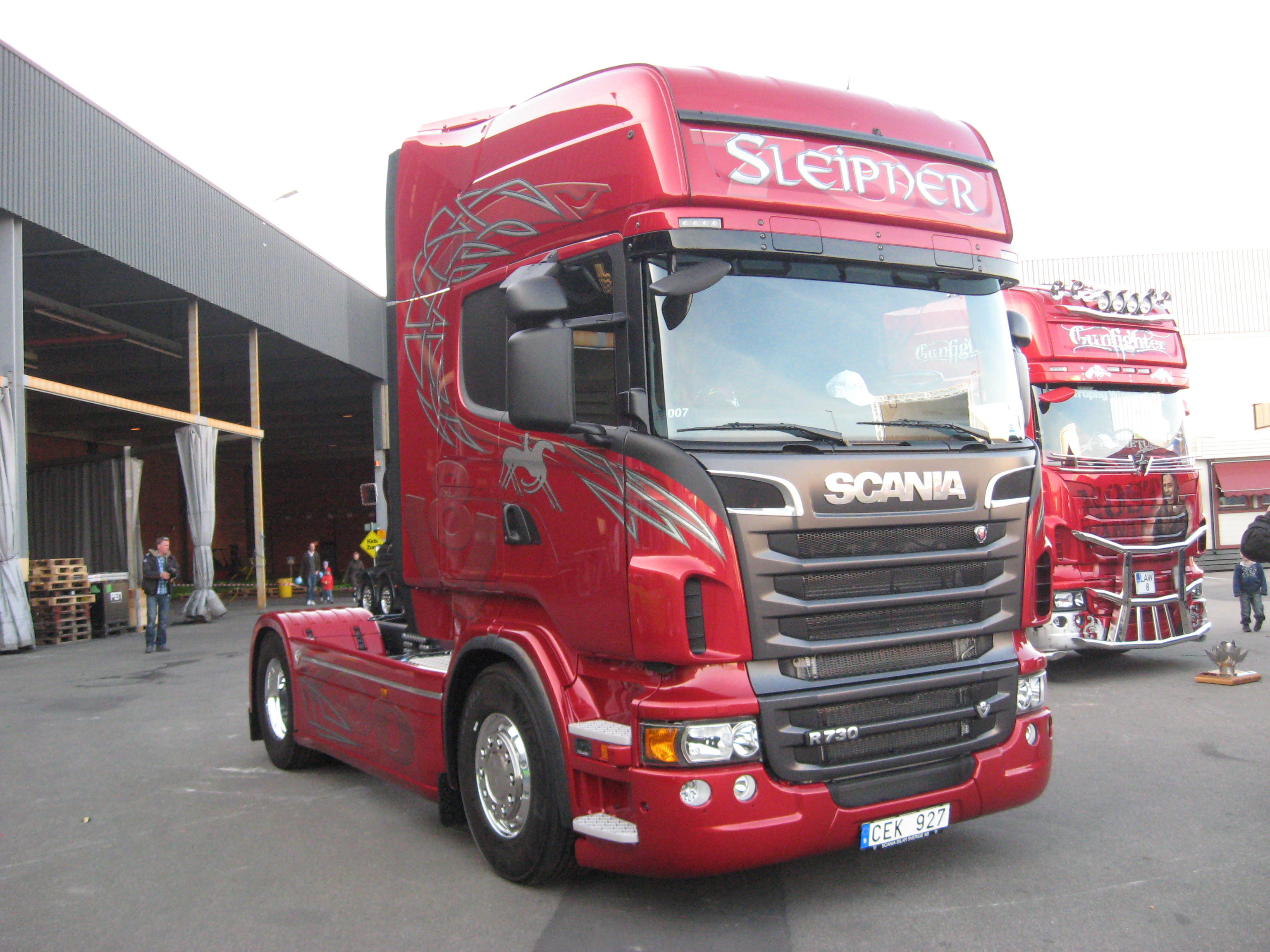
Scania R730 truck.

After the failed takeover Volvo sold their shares in Scania to Volkswagen Group in the early 2000s. Volkswagen has since then increased their interest in Scania and since 2008 Volkswagen Group is the majority owner.

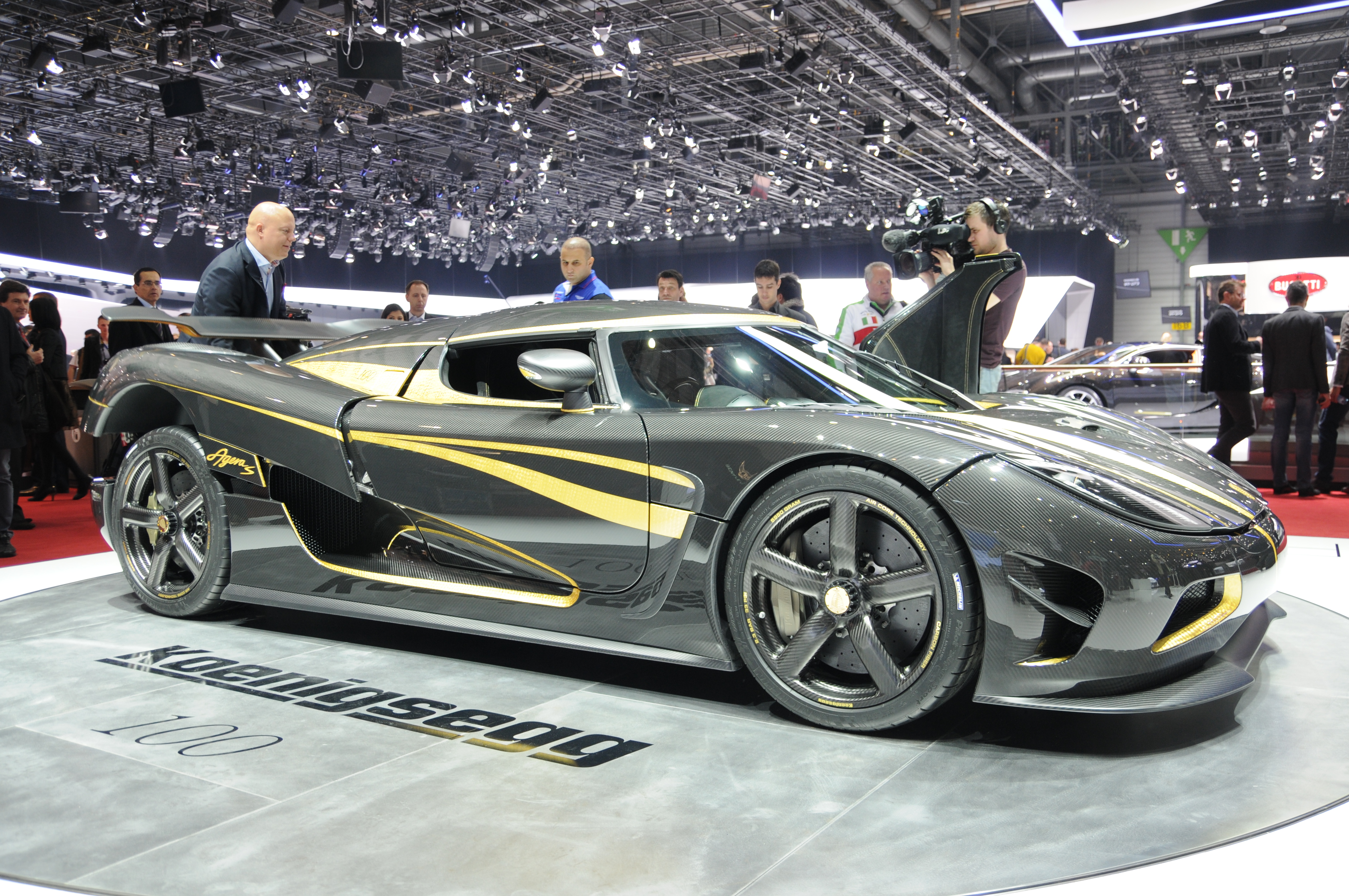
Koenigsegg Agera S Hundra at the 2013 Geneva Motor Show.

The first Koenigsegg sports car left the factory in 2002. The price of the car keeps production on a low level but in 2013 the company delivered their 100th vehicle.

The automotive industry crisis of 2008–10 has had a great impact on the formerly Swedish owned automobile makers. In 2009 Ford sold Volvo Cars to Chinese Zhejiang Geely Holding Group. Volvo Cars is the first western automotive manufacturer owned by a Chinese company.

In 2008 General Motors (GM) decided to either sell or, if no suitable buyer turned up, kill off Saab Automobile. First prospective buyer was Swedish sports car manufacturer Koenigsegg. When these talks failed Dutch sports car maker Spyker Cars succeeded. Spyker bought Saab Automobile from GM in 2010 forming Swedish Automobile. The deal ended in bankruptcy less than two years later.

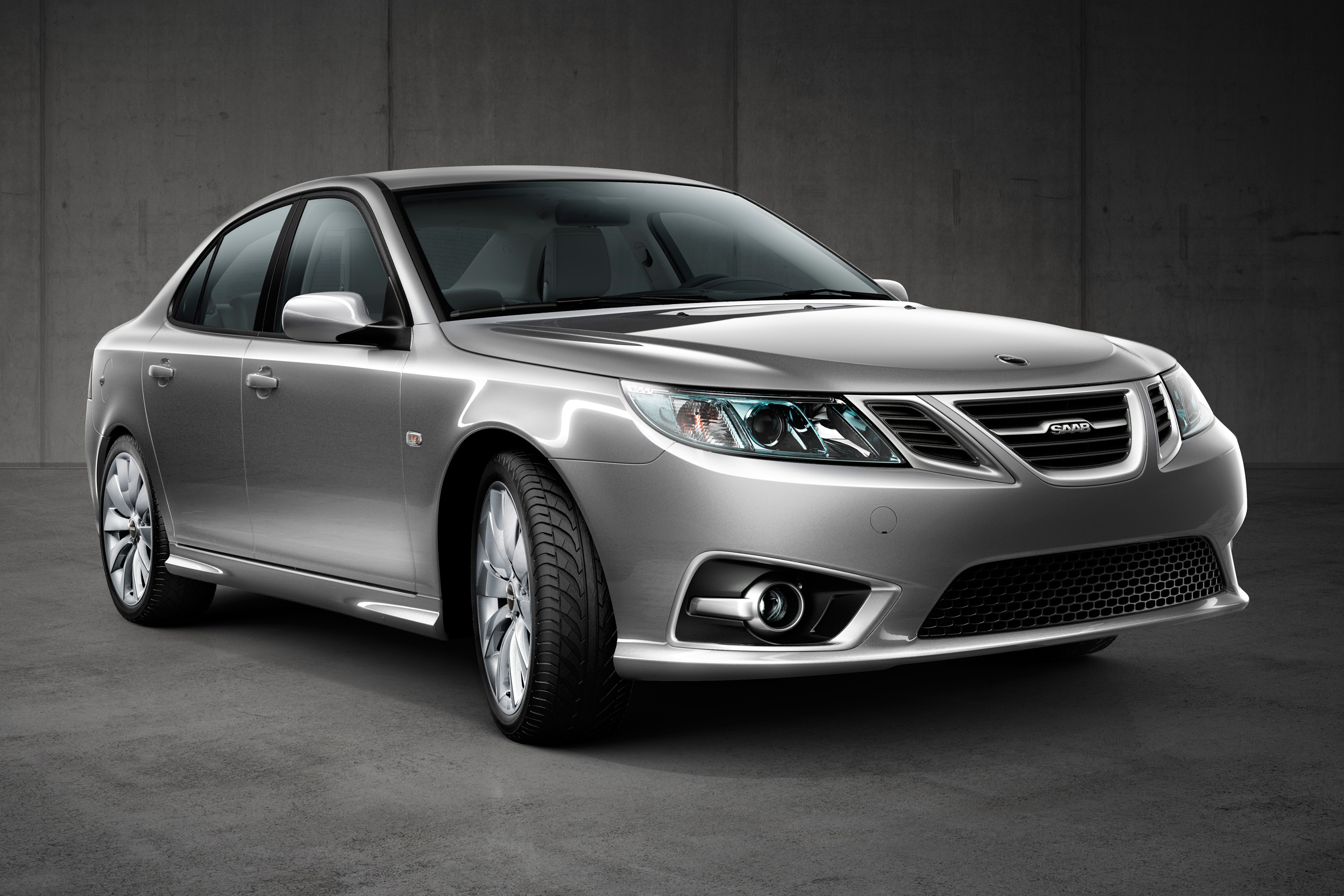
2014 NEVS Saab 9-3

In 2012 Chinese-Japanese National Electric Vehicle Sweden (NEVS) announced they had bought the remains of Saab Automobile. They have also received the rights to use the Saab name from Saab AB. NEVS is planning to start production of an electric car based on the well proven Saab 9-3 platform in Trollhättan.

In 2013 Volvo AB announced they will set up a joint venture with Chinese auto maker Dongfeng Motor to build heavy trucks in China. With this deal Volvo will surpass Daimler AG and become the biggest manufacturer of heavy trucks in the world.

In 2016, the startup Uniti Sweden raised over €1,227,990 via a crowdfunding campaign to develop and manufacture a high tech electric city car. Uniti is a lightweight sustainable electric car made of biocomposites and carbon fibers. The car will be registered in the heavy quadricycle category (L7e) and will feature new technologies such as a steer-by-wire system as well as a head-up display. The car is designed to reach 300 km of range and a maximum speed of 120 km/h. The factory will be located in Sweden and the company will produce 50,000 cars per year.

== Production by year ==
| Year | Unit production |
|---|---|
| 1950 | 28,000 |
| 1960 | 129,000 |
| 1970 | 311,000 |
| 1980 | 317,000 |
| 1990 | 344,000 |
| 2000 | 301,343 |
| 2005 | 339,229 |
| 2006 | 333,072 |
| 2007 | 366,020 |
| 2008 | 308,299 |
| 2009 | 156,338 |
| 2010 | 217,084 |
| 2011 | 188,969 |
| 2012 | 162,814 |

== Sales by year ==
Top 10 best-selling models in Sweden (new passenger and commercial vehicles), 1975–2020 Source : BSCB Table indicators Small (B) Car Medium (C) / Large (D) Car Executive (E) / Luxury (F) / Sports (S) Car Crossover / SUV (J)
| Year | Models and Ranking | | | | | | | | | | Year |
| Year | 1st | 2nd | 3rd | 4th | 5th | 6th | 7th | 8th | 9th | 10th | Year |
|---|---|---|---|---|---|---|---|---|---|---|---|
| 1975 | Volvo 200 Series | Saab 99 | Volkswagen Passat | Saab 95/96 | not available | Volkswagen Golf | not available | | | | 1975 |
| 1976 | Volvo 200 Series | not available | | | | | | | | | 1976 |
| 1977 | Volvo 200 Series | not available | | | | | | | | | 1977 |
| 1978 | Volvo 200 Series | Saab 99 | Volvo 300 Series | Volkswagen Golf | Ford Granada | Opel Rekord | not available | | Saab 95/96 | not available | 1978 |
| 1979 | Volvo 200 Series | Saab 900 | Volvo 300 Series | Volkswagen Golf | Saab 99 | Opel Kadett | Opel Rekord | not available | | Mercedes-Benz W123 | 1979 |
| 1980 | Volvo 200 Series | Saab 900 | Volkswagen Golf | Volvo 300 Series | not available | | Mercedes-Benz W123 | not available | | | 1980 |
| 1981 | Volvo 200 Series | Saab 900 | Volkswagen Golf/Jetta | Volvo 300 Series | not available | | Mazda 323 | Saab 99 | not available | | 1981 |
| 1982 | Volvo 200 Series | Saab 900 | Volkswagen Golf/Jetta | Opel Kadett | Volvo 300 Series | Saab 99 | Mazda 323 | not available | | | 1982 |
| 1983 | Volvo 200 Series | Saab 900 | Volkswagen Golf/Jetta | not available | | | | | | | 1983 |
| 1984 | Volvo 200 Series | Saab 900 | Volkswagen Golf/Jetta | Volvo 700 Series | Ford Escort | Volvo 300 Series | Opel Kadett | Ford Sierra | Saab 90 | Mazda 323 | 1984 |
| 1985 | Volvo 700 Series | Volvo 200 Series | Saab 900 | Volkswagen Golf/Jetta | Opel Kadett | Volvo 300 Series | not available | | | | 1985 |
| 1986 | Volvo 700 Series | not available | | | | | | | | | 1986 |
| 1987 | Volvo 700 Series | Saab 900 | Volkswagen Golf/Jetta | Volvo 200 Series | Opel Kadett | Ford Sierra | not available | | | Toyota Corolla | 1987 |
| 1988 | Volvo 700 Series | Volkswagen Golf/Jetta | Volvo 200 Series | Opel Kadett | Saab 900 | not available | Saab 9000 | Toyota Corolla | not available | Mazda 626 | 1988 |
| 1989 | Volvo 700 Series | Volkswagen Golf/Jetta | Saab 9000 | Volvo 200 Series | Volvo 400 Series | not available | | | Toyota Corolla | not available | 1989 |
| 1990 | Volvo 700 Series | Saab 9000 | Volkswagen Golf/Jetta | Toyota Corolla | Volvo 200 Series | not available | | | | | 1990 |
| 1991 | Volvo 900 Series | Saab 9000 | Volvo 700 Series | Volkswagen Golf/Jetta | Ford Escort/Orion | Toyota Corolla | Audi 100 | not available | | | 1991 |
| 1992 | Volvo 900 Series | Saab 9000 | Volvo 800 Series | Toyota Corolla | Volkswagen Golf/Jetta | Audi 100 | Ford Escort/Orion | Volvo 400 Series | not available | | 1992 |
| 1993 | Volvo 800 Series | Volvo 900 Series | Saab 9000 | Volkswagen Golf/Jetta | not available | Saab 900 | not available | | | Ford Mondeo | 1993 |
| 1994 | Volvo 800 Series | Volvo 900 Series | Saab 900 | Ford Escort/Orion | Saab 9000 | not available | Volvo 400 Series | Ford Mondeo | not available | | 1994 |
| 1995 | Volvo 800 Series | Volvo 900 Series | Saab 9000 | Saab 900 | Volkswagen Golf | Ford Escort | Opel Astra | Ford Mondeo | Volvo 400 Series | not available | 1995 |
| 1996 | Volvo 800 Series | Volvo 900 Series | Volkswagen Golf | not available | Saab 900 | Saab 9000 | Volvo S/V40 | not available | | | 1996 |
| 1997 | Volvo S/V/C70 | Volvo S/V90 | Volvo S/V40 | Ford Escort | Ford Mondeo | Volkswagen Golf | Saab 9000 | Saab 900 | Volkswagen Passat | Renault Mégane | 1997 |
| 1998 | Volvo S/V/C70 | Volvo S/V40 | not available | | | | | | | | 1998 |
| 1999 | Volvo S/V/C70 | Volvo S/V40 | Saab 9-5 | Volvo S80 | Saab 900/9-3 | not available | | | | | 1999 |
| 2000 | Volvo S/V/C70 | Saab 9-5 | Volvo S/V40 | Saab 9-3 | not available | | | | | | 2000 |
| 2001 | Volvo S/V/C70 | Saab 9-5 | Volvo S60 | Volvo S/V40 | Saab 9-3 | not available | | | | | 2001 |
| 2002 | Volvo V/C70 | Saab 9-5 | Renault Mégane | Saab 9-3 | Volvo S/V40 | Volkswagen Golf | not available | | | | 2002 |
| 2003 | Volvo V/C70 | Saab 9-5 | Saab 9-3 | Volkswagen Golf | Volvo S/V40 | Renault Mégane | not available | | | | 2003 |
| 2004 | Volvo V/C70 | Saab 9-5 | Saab 9-3 | Volkswagen Golf | not available | | Volvo V50 | not available | | | 2004 |
| 2005 | Volvo V/C70 | Volvo V50 | Saab 9-5 | Volkswagen Golf | Saab 9-3 | not available | | | | | 2005 |
| 2006 | Volvo V70 | Saab 9-5 | Volvo V50 | Saab 9-3 | Volkswagen Golf | not available | | | | | 2006 |
| 2007 | Volvo V70 | Saab 9-3 | Volvo V50 | Saab 9-5 | Volkswagen Passat | not available | | | | | 2007 |
| 2008 | Volvo V70 | Saab 9-3 | Volvo V50 | Volkswagen Golf | Audi A4 | not available | | | | | 2008 |
| 2009 | Volvo V70 | Volvo V50 | Volkswagen Passat | Volkswagen Golf | Kia Ceed | not available | BMW 3 Series | not available | | | 2009 |
| 2010 | Volvo V70 | not available | | | | | | | | | 2010 |
| 2011 | Volvo V70 | Volkswagen Passat | Volkswagen Golf | Volvo V60 | Volvo V50 | not available | Volvo XC60 | not available | | BMW 5 Series | 2011 |
| 2012 | Volvo V70 | Volkswagen Passat | Volvo S/V60 | Volkswagen Golf | Kia Ceed | Volvo XC60 | Ford Focus | BMW 3 Series | Toyota Yaris | not available | 2012 |
| 2013 | Volvo V70 | Volkswagen Passat | Volvo S/V60 | Volkswagen Golf | Volvo V40 | Volvo XC60 | not available | | Toyota Auris | not available | 2013 |
| 2014 | Volvo V70 | Volkswagen Golf | Volvo S/V60 | Volkswagen Passat | Volvo XC60 | Volvo V40 | not available | | | | 2014 |
| 2015 | Volvo V70 | Volkswagen Golf | Volvo XC60 | not available | | | | | | | 2015 |
| 2016 | Volkswagen Golf | Volvo S/V90 | Volvo S/V60 | Volvo XC60 | Volkswagen Passat | Volvo V40 | not available | Volkswagen Polo | not available | | 2016 |
| 2017 | Volvo XC60 | Volvo S/V90 | Volkswagen Golf | Volvo S/V60 | Volkswagen Passat | Volvo V40 | Volkswagen Tiguan | BMW 5 Series | not available | | 2017 |
| 2018 | Volvo S/V90 | Volkswagen Golf | Volvo S/V60 | Volkswagen Passat | Volvo XC60 | Volkswagen Tiguan | not available | | | | 2018 |
| 2019 | Volvo S/V60 | Volvo S/V90 | Volkswagen Golf | Volvo XC60 | Volkswagen Tiguan | Volkswagen Passat | Kia Niro | Volvo XC40 | Kia Ceed | Nissan Qashqai | 2019 |
| 2020 | Volvo S/V60 | Volvo XC60 | Volvo XC40 | Volkswagen Golf | Volkswagen Passat | Volvo S/V90 | not available | | | | 2020 |
| | 1st | 2nd | 3rd | 4th | 5th | 6th | 7th | 8th | 9th | 10th | |
See also : Best-selling models in: Australia; Brazil; India; Indonesia; Malaysia; Philippines; Thailand

== See also ==
- List of automobile manufacturers of Sweden
