= Hulsebos-Hesselman axial oil engines =

Hulsebos-Hesselman axial oil engines were five cylinder, four stroke, wobble plate engines that originated in and were used throughout the Netherlands during the late 1930s. Numerous patents can be found concerning this engine, all of which appear to attribute the engine's "wabbler" operating principles to the inventor Wichert Hulsebos.

== Combustion system ==
This engine used the Hesselman engine low compression combustion system where oils of varying grades were sprayed into the cylinder during compression but ignition was initiated and assisted by a spark plug. Overhead inlet and exhaust valves, water cooling and a magneto for ignition were standard features.

== Dimensions ==
The capacity of 4 litres was achieved with a bore of 95 mm and a stroke of 114 mm and it made use of a compression ratio of 6 to 1. Power output was said to be 70 bhp at 2400 rpm.

== Wobble plate arrangement ==
The wobble plate arrangement cleverly employed a bevel gear set to prevent its rotation around the crankshaft. One bevel gear was fitted to the rear of the wobble plate itself and meshed with another which was fixed to the main body of the engine.

== Production ==
They were manufactured by Hulsemo N.V., Casimirlaan 5, Arnhem, The Netherlands, and were exhibited in the Berlin and Amsterdam Shows during 1938.
