= Hesselman engine =

Type of internal combustion engine

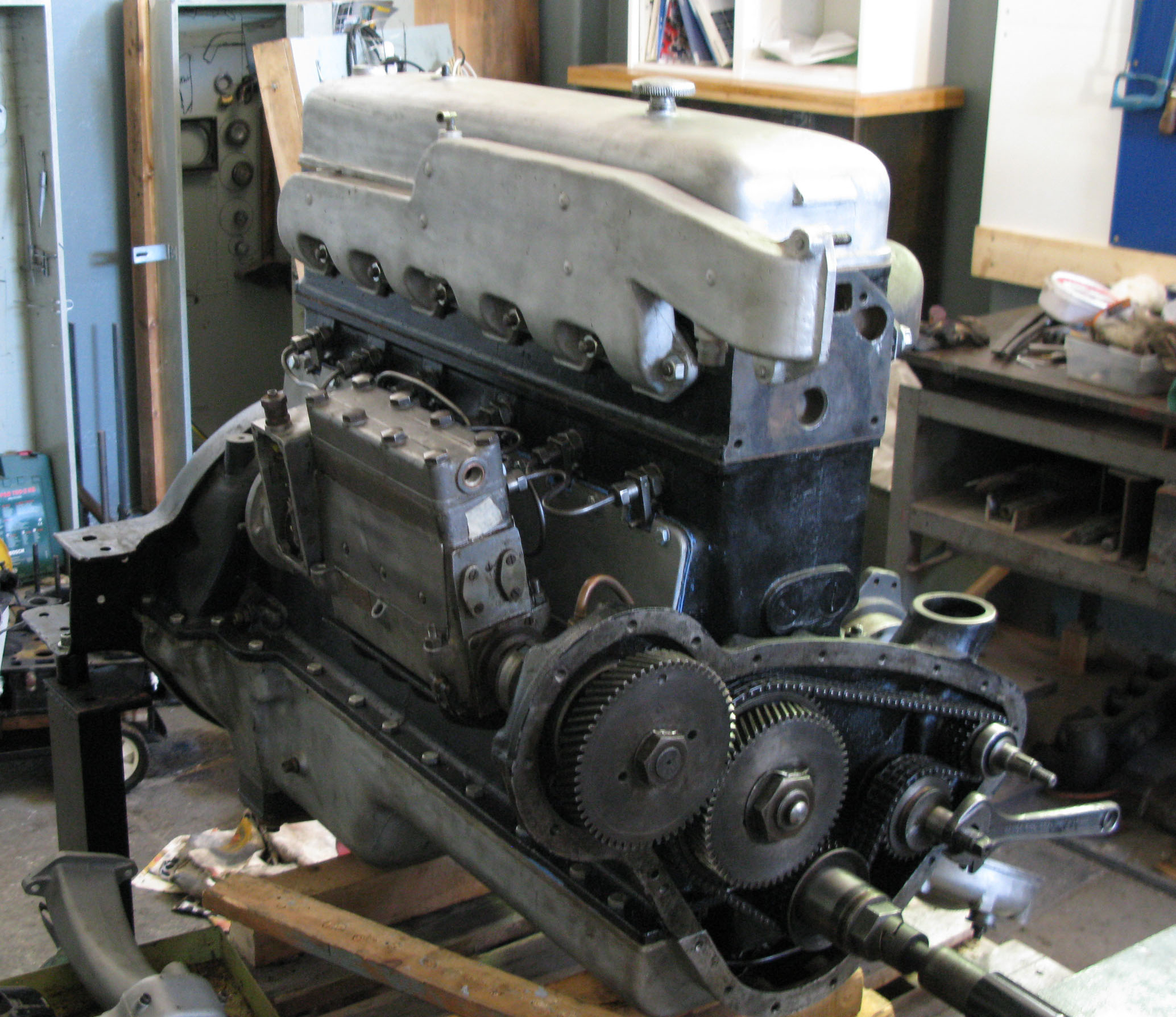
- Tidaholm Hesselman engine undergoing refurbishment.
- Classification: Internal combustion engine
- Application: Gas compressors, powerboats, pumps, railcars, trucks
- Fuel source: Diesel or various heavy fuel oils
- Inventor: Jonas Hesselman
- Invented: 1925 (101 years ago)

The Hesselman engine is a hybrid between a petrol engine and a diesel engine. It was designed and introduced in 1925 by Swedish engineer Jonas Hesselman.

In a Hesselman engine, fuel is not injected during the suction stroke along with the air, as would be the case in a conventional Otto cycle engine, but is instead injected during the compression stroke slightly ahead of the spark. Hesselman engines typically have lower efficiencies than diesel engines but can run on the same fuels without needing to sustain high compression ratios, and therefore could be made smaller, lighter and cheaper.

Most Hesselman engines were built during the 1930s and 1940s by firms in Sweden and the United States for use in both heavy vehicles and stationary industrial applications.

== Operation ==
During the engine's operating cycle, air is first drawn into the cylinder through an intake valve and given a rotary motion as a result of its tangential direction of entry. Air is compressed on the "up" stroke of the piston without stopping its rotary motion. At about 50 degrees before top dead-center, fuel is injected toward the spark plug from the opposite side of the combustion chamber. The rotary movement of the air mixes the air and fuel while carrying the mixture past the spark plug. The spark occurs at about 15 degrees before top dead-center after which the engine completes its power and exhaust strokes and the cycle began again. Timing for the start of fuel injection and spark are fixed. Throttling of the engine is achieved by linked variation of air intake volume and duration of fuel injection.

In practice Hesselman engines had efficiencies higher than contemporary carburetor spark ignition engines but lower than diesel engines. The combination of low-ratio, air-only compression and spark plug ignition allowed Hesselman engines to run on fuel oil, kerosene, petrol, coal derived tar-oils or alcohol although most ultimately ran on conventional diesel fuels. It was common to start Hesselman engines using petrol from a small auxiliary tank before switching over to cheaper diesel fuel from the main fuel tank.

== History ==
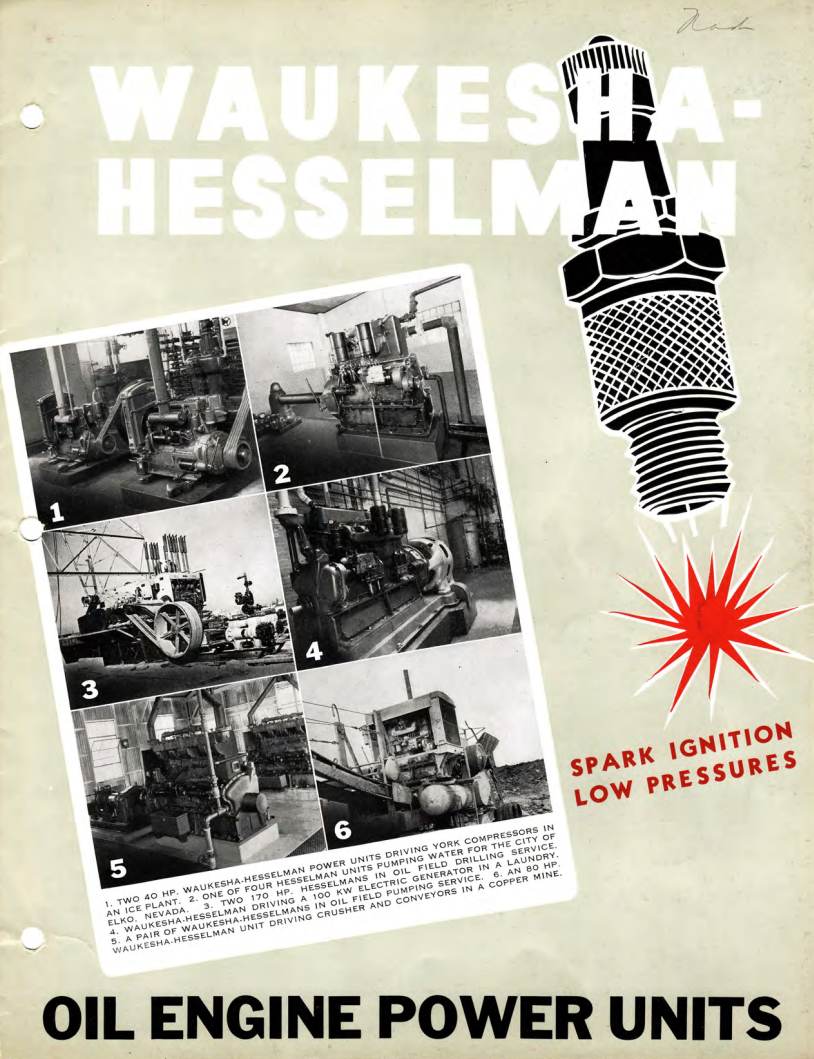
Waukesha-Hesselman brochure

The Hesselman engine was first described in 1925 by Jonas Hesselman, who was already a leading authority on diesel engine design and had created hundreds of patents.

Hesselman engines were built in Sweden by Scania-Vabis, Tidaholms Bruk and Volvo. Some engines were also built in Germany by AEG.

In the United States, Hesselman engines were built by the Waukesha Motor Company for both vehicular and industrial applications. Smaller numbers of Hesselman engines were also built by Allis-Chalmers for use in tracked vehicles. Waukesha-Hesselman engines remained in production until 1951.

Marketing tactics emphasised the engine's ease of starting and low smoke emissions when compared to contemporary diesel engines, as well as its ability to run on low cost fuels.

Hesselman engines were produced in relatively small numbers (around 500 by 1934) but were tried in wide variety of applications that typically used diesel engines. Transport applications included trucks, buses, powerboats and railcars. Stationary Hesselman engines were used to drive pumps, gas compressors and a variety of other industrial machinery.

== See also ==
- Hulsebos-Hesselman axial oil engines
- Gasoline direct injection
- Diesel engine
