= Tidaholms Bruk =

Defunct Swedish vehicle manufacturer

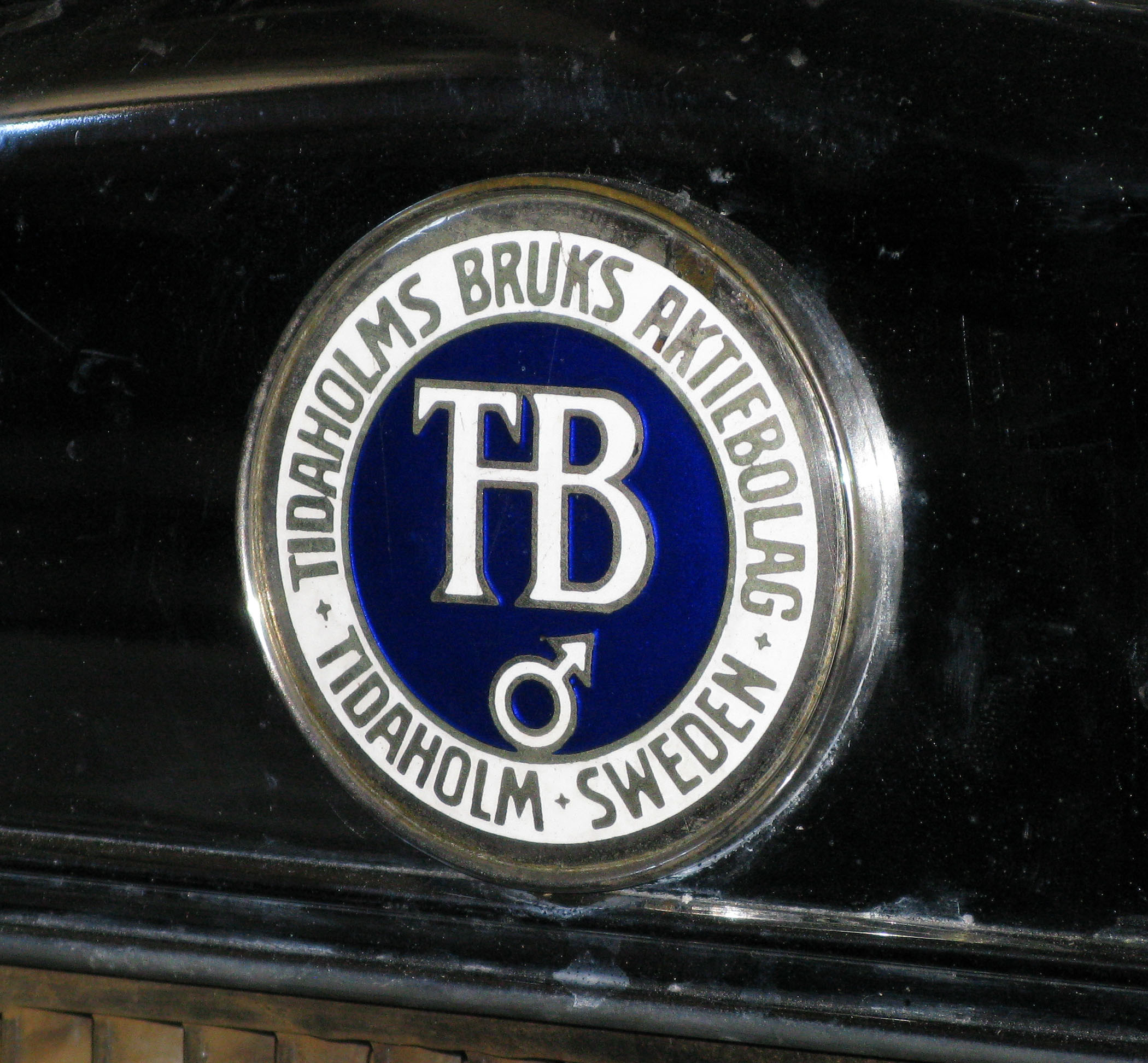
- Industry: Automotive
- Headquarters: Tidaholm, Sweden
- Key people: Gottfrid Lindström; David Lindström

Tidaholms Bruk (the Tidaholm works) was a Swedish vehicle manufacturer. Originally a woodworking and cart manufacturing business founded in the Middle Ages, the company evolved along the centuries and entered the automotive industry with the creation of the Tidaholm car in 1903. Their early models include Tor I, Tor II, and TB, known for their reliability. Facing financial difficulties during the Great Depression, the company eventually closed in the early 1930s. While the company is no longer in operation, it played a significant role in Sweden's automotive history.

== Origins ==
Founded in the Middle Ages, over the years it merged with several smaller industries into woodworking, ironworking, and the making of carts. In the small community of Sandhem outside Tidaholm, brothers Gottfrid and David Lindström founded a workshop in 1895, where they made Kronan bicycles. After a while Gottfrid got tired of making bicycles and went to USA to study the budding automobile industry and returned full of new ideas, which he presented to the Managing Director of Tidaholms Bruk. Lindström was a workaholic and he worked late into the nights to create Tidaholmsbilen (the Tidaholm car). Most of the parts were made within the works. Engine blocks and pistons in the foundry, the frame in the smithy, transmission in the mechanical workshop, woodwork in the wood workshop. In the fall of 1903 it was time for the first start attempt which was successful and the first Tidaholm car (which was a truck, actually) could roll out of the workshop under its own power.

== Early vehicles ==
The first model was called Tor I and was powered by a two-cylinder engine producing about 10 hp at 800 rpm. It could carry 1.5 tonnes (3,300 lb) with a curb weight of 2.7 tonnes (6,000 lb). It was sold to Surte Glasbruk and was used to transport peat. The high reliability of the car inspired the managing director Victor Johansson to put Lindström in charge of building Tor II which was finished in 1905. Tor II had three gears forward and one reverse. It was used for demonstrations at the country fair in Skara in 1905. By 1907–1910 the manufacturing had come so far that the works built a small series of ten chassis of type TB, a combined truck and personnel car, or open bus powered by a four-cylinder, German Fafnir engine, giving about 12 hp. Later, this was replaced with engines from Argus, with power ranging between 12 and 16 horsepower. Four or six passenger cars were built in 1911 or 1912, the first probably using an imported German body. The second was a test car for a possible larger production. When Tidaholms Bruk folded in 1934 this car was sold to a blacksmith and its fate is unknown. The third car was exported to Russia and delivered to a Grand Duke in St Petersburg. The Thulin logo in the front was written in Cyrillic letters on that car. A fourth car was sold to firefighters in Uppsala.

In September 1914, the company changed hands, when it was purchased by a consortium headed by Josef Kastengren. In 1915, Tidaholm started selling their trucks under the Castor brand. After a series of management changes, this brand was abandoned by 1919. In 1917 sales to the important Russian market came to an abrupt halt with the Russian Revolution and the company entered a period of decline. From 200 employees in 1917, the staff numbered in the low tens in 1921. The lineup was reduced as demand dried up, leaving the 2.5–3 tonnes (5,500–6,600 lb) model as the only available one by 1918. Due to rubber shortages, the trucks were also delivered with wheels that could accommodate ersatz tires made from wood. The company barely stayed afloat by operating a saw mill, exporting wooden revetments as far afield as France, but in 1922 an order for five fire trucks to Jönköping began a slow upswing in company fortunes.

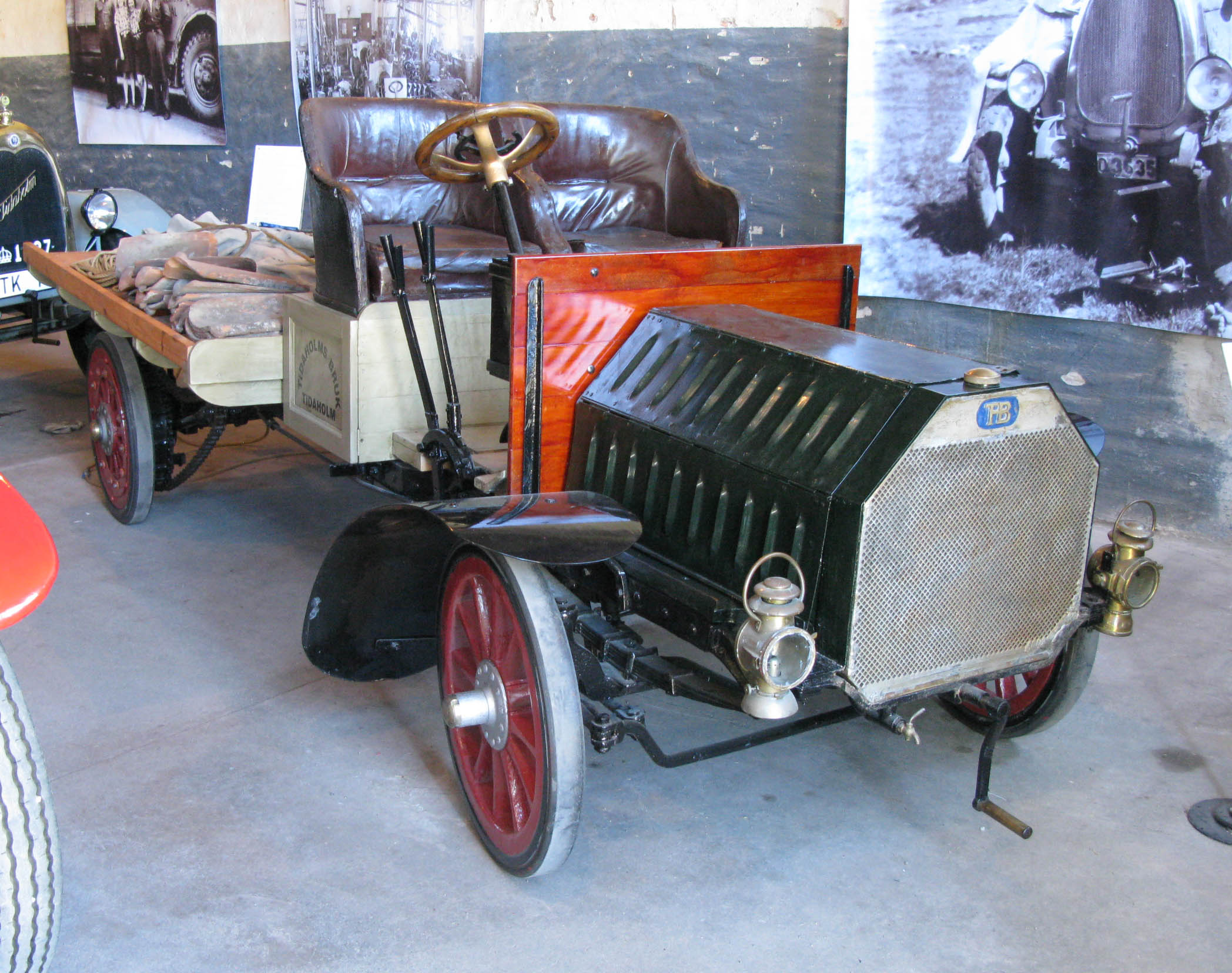
Tidaholm truck from 1907

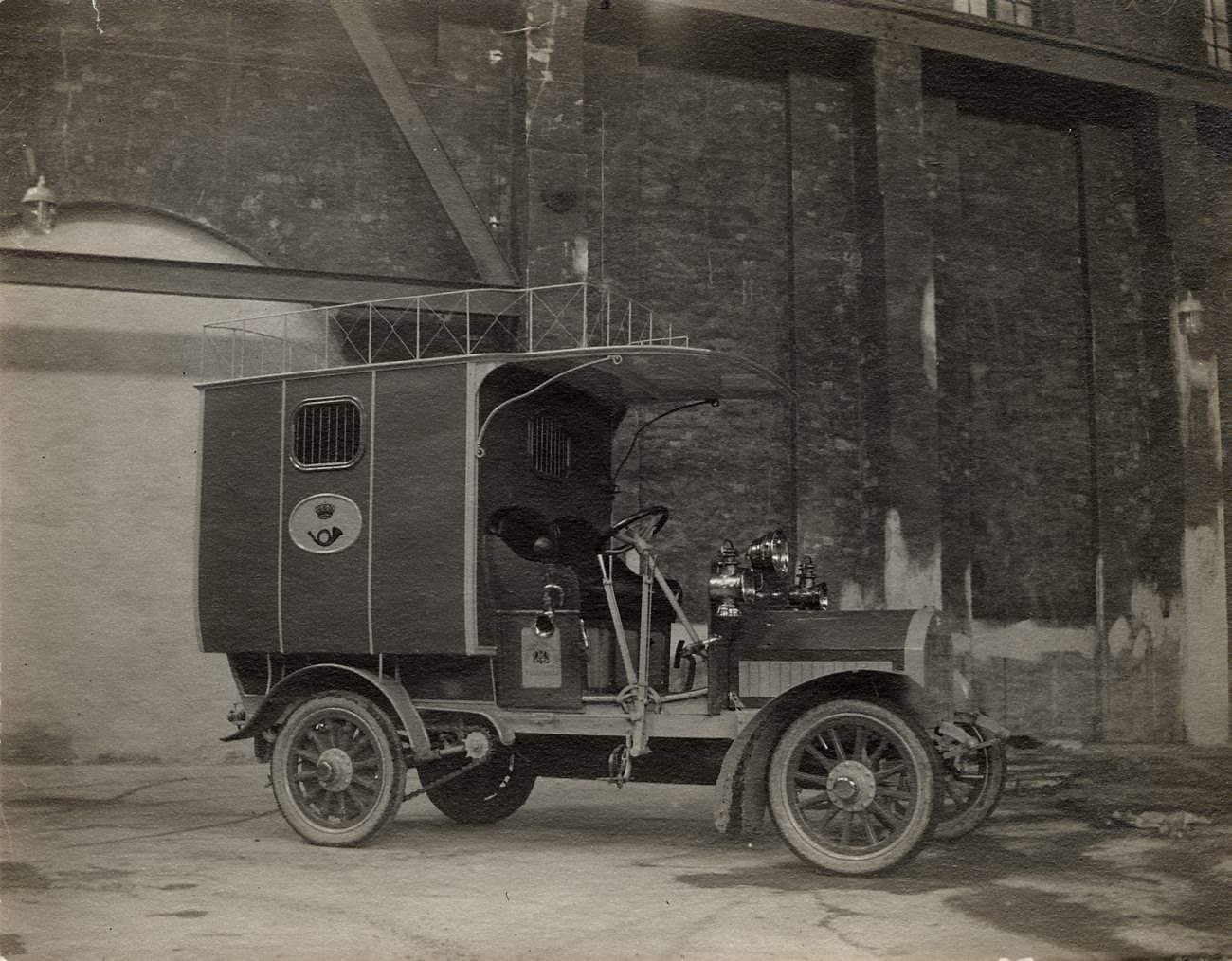
Tidaholm mail truck from 1912

== Later vehicles ==
Tidaholms Bruk also sold German Fafnir cars and Argus and Deutz engines. It's very possible both engines and body from German cars was used on Tidaholm cars. A car made for Stockholms Södra Spårvägs AB had a Bugatti engine. From 1923 onwards all parts were made using a tolerance system making all parts interchangeable and standardised. They also had a testing department that tested the parts before they were assembled. In the 1920s buses became very popular and the works built special bus chassis. The engines were often four cylinder engines giving something like 40-50 hp. Starting in 1928 they worked in two shifts to be able to meet demand. In 1929 they introduced hydraulic four wheel brakes, which was also when the company begun developing its first engine operating on the Hesselman principle. In 1930 engineer Allan Lindström designed the first three-axis bus chassis with both rear axles driven and three differentials. This was important for buses as it meant larger passenger space and softer running. The design also allowed a lower tire pressure. The first heavy truck with sleeping cabin was made in 1930. In 1931 they also made road trains for passenger transport where the bus held 37 passengers and the trailer 23. They were used by SJ in Bohuslän.

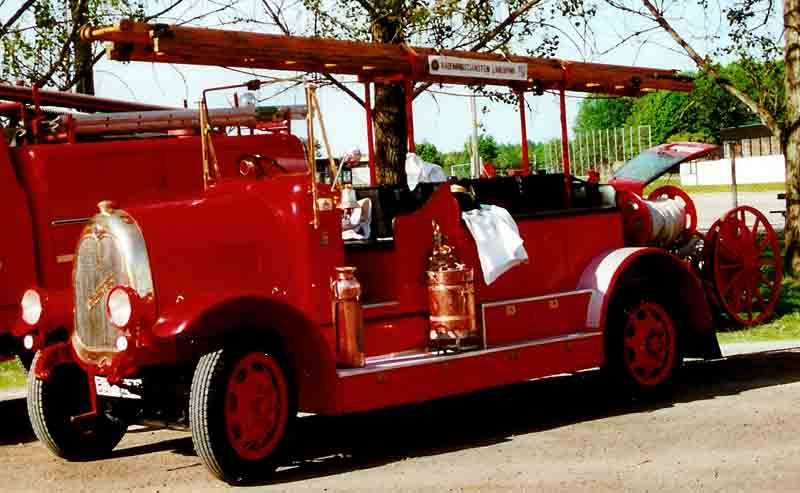
Tidaholm Fire Engine 1924

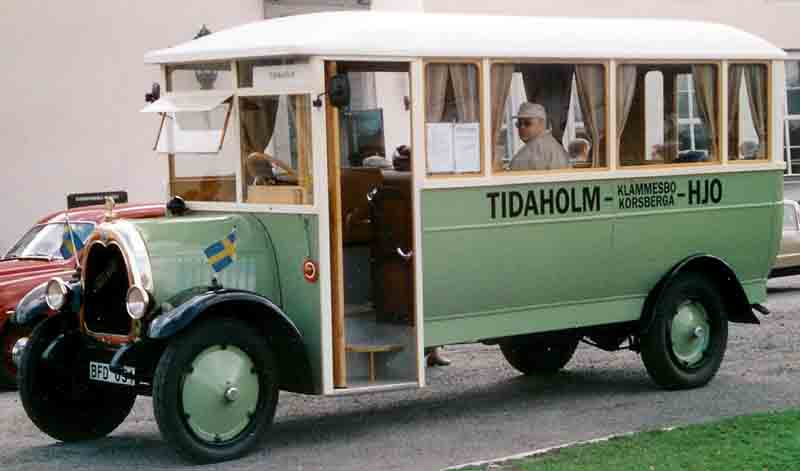
Tidaholm TSLO Bus 1925

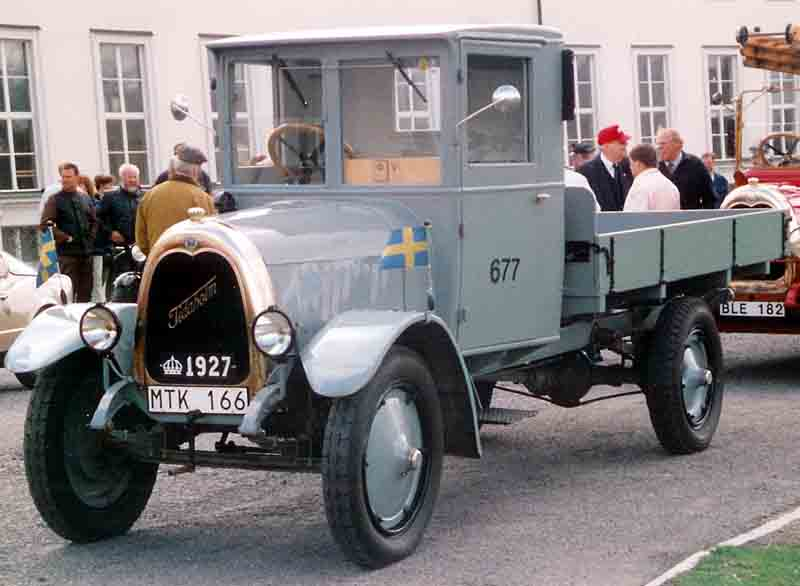
Tidaholm TSL Truck 1927

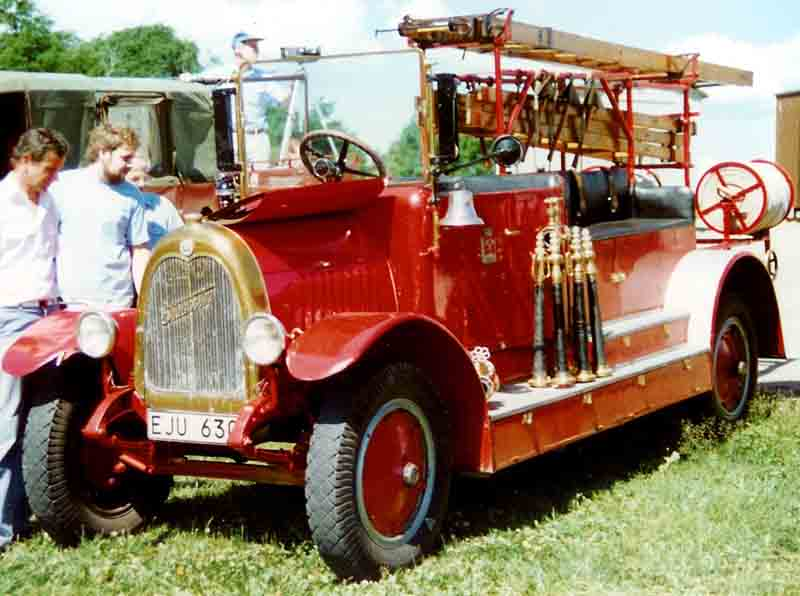
Tidaholm Fire Engine 1927

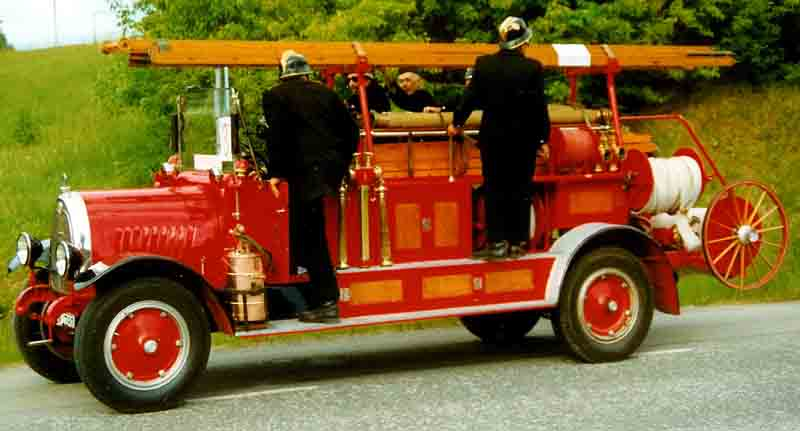
Tidaholm T2C Fire Engine 1929

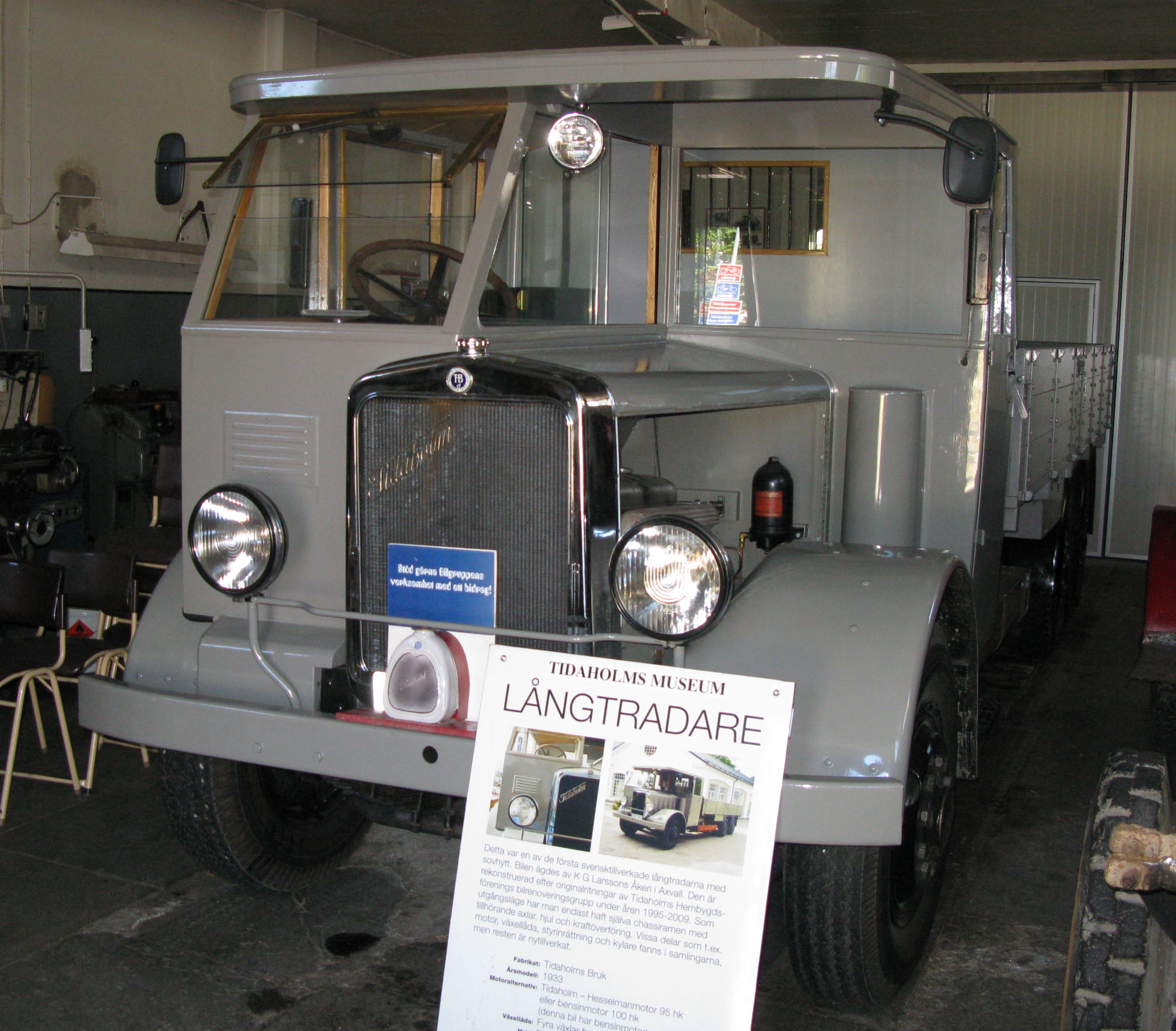
1933 Tidaholm T6L, three-axle sleeper truck

== Closure ==
Tidaholms Bruk made well built engines and chassis and they sold well, but experiments and frequent new designs leading to small production runs cost a lot of money. The Great Depression led to the Kreuger crash, after which the company was taken over by Stockholms Enskilda Bank - controlled by the Wallenberg family. The Wallenbergs already controlled Scania-Vabis, and with Volvo on the rise it was determined that already struggling Tidaholm company was going to have to close. In December 1933 the announcement was made, and in late summer 1934 activities began winding down. The final bus deliveries were made in early 1935.

== See also ==
- Hesselman engine
