= Cederholm (car) =

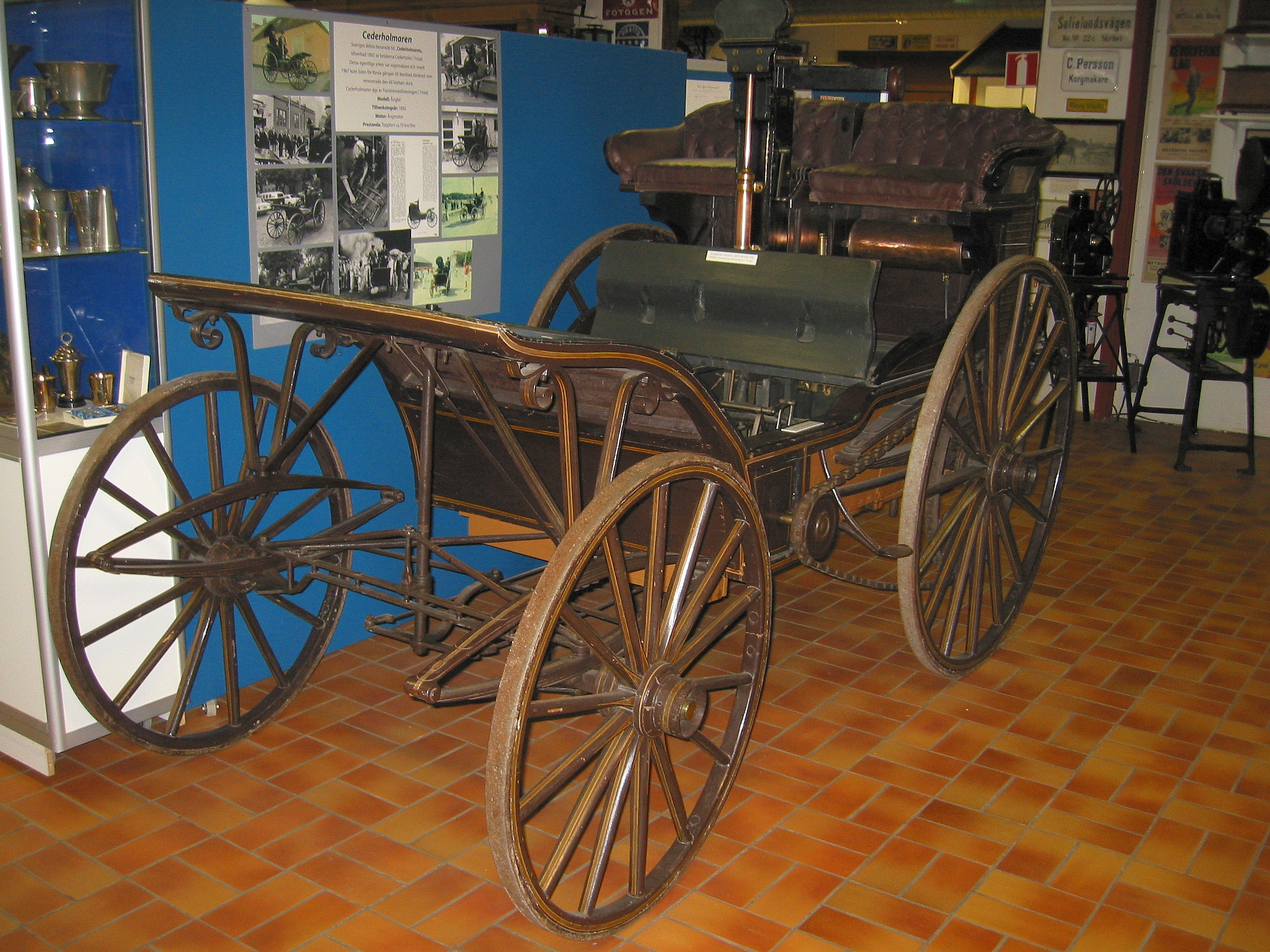

Overview
- Manufacturer: Jöns & Anders Cederholm
- Production: 1892–1894

The Cederholm is a home-built steam-powered car, built in Ystad from 1892 to 1894. It was built by two Cederholm brothers, Anders (1858–1925) who was a blacksmith and Jöns (1855–1925) who was a painter and initiator. They had a coachmaker, Eliasson, to help them, who made the seat and some wooden details.

== History ==
The brothers built two steam-powered cars, the first was very difficult to steer and lacked brakes, it broke down on its first trip and they drove it off the road. They reused parts for the second improved construction. better. It had better steering and, among other things, a differential, which the first lacked. The brothers took a number of pleasure trips with the car, including to Ystad's sand forest where they had a summer cottage. The car had major problems with its reliability, and their vehicle became the subject of jokes from the people of Ystad and soon became obsolete.

The car was renovated by Manfred Almquist (1911–1996) and was for many years at the Johannamuseet in Skurup. It is now owned by the Ystad Historical Society and was displayed at the Ystad Military Museum from 2013 to 2023 when the museum closed. It was then moved to the Technical and Maritime Museum in Malmö.

The Cederholmaren is in drivable condition and is said to be the oldest Swedish-made car still in existence.
