= Tidaholm =

- Founded as a city in 1910
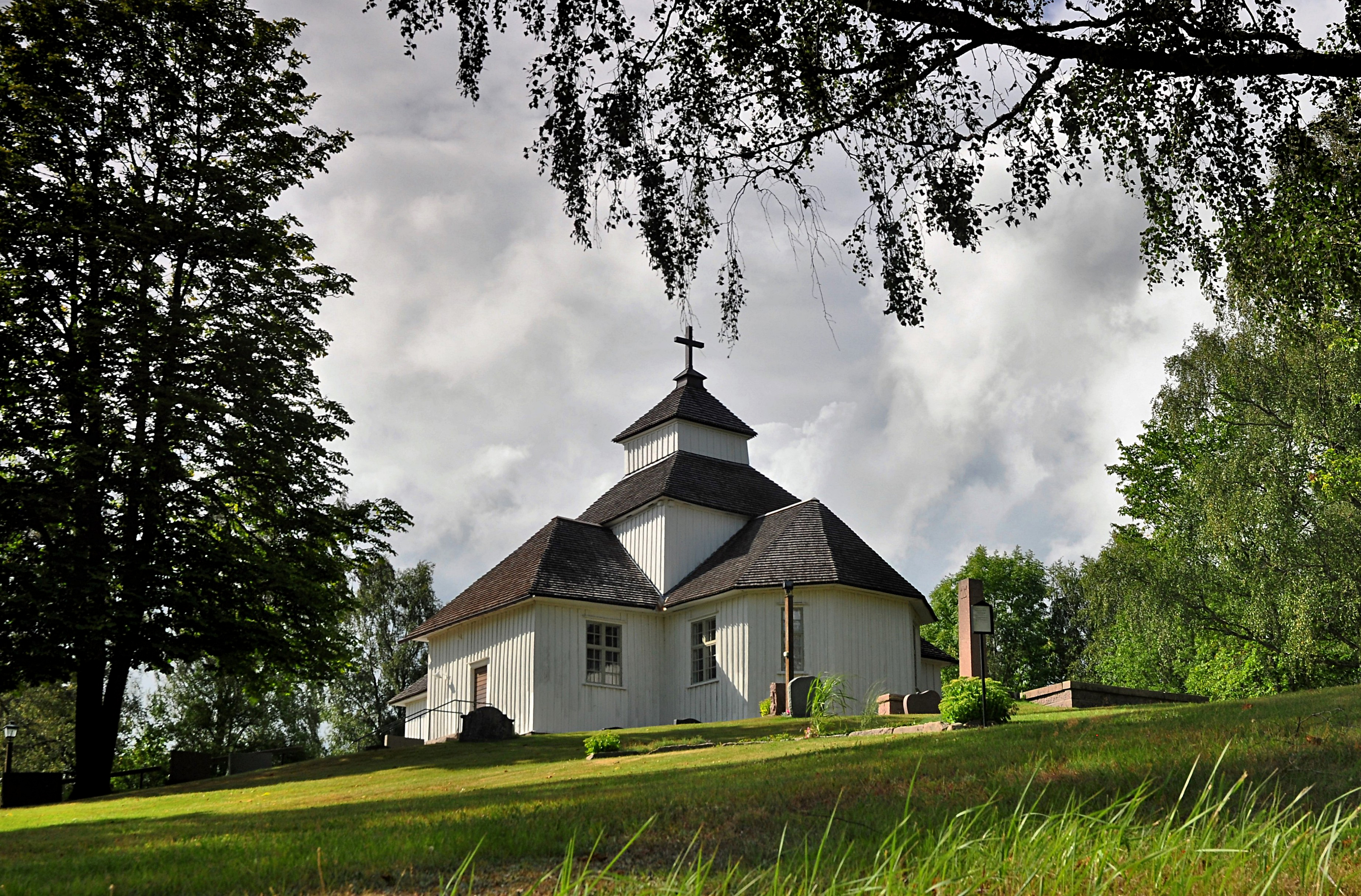
- Vättak's Church in Tidaholm, Sweden.

- Coat of arms

- Location within Västra Götaland Location within Sweden
- Coordinates: 58°11′N 13°57′E
- Country: Sweden
- Province: Västergötland
- County: Västra Götaland County
- Municipality: Tidaholm Municipality

Area
  - Total: 5.70 km^{2} (2.20 sq mi)

Population (31 December 2020)
  - Total: 12,790
  - Density: 1,408/km^{2} (3,650/sq mi)
- Time zone: UTC+1 (CET)
  - Summer (DST): UTC+2 (CEST)
- Climate: Dfb

Tidaholm is a locality and the seat of Tidaholm Municipality in Västergötland Province within Västra Götaland County, Sweden, consisting of 520 square kilometers, or a little more than 200 square miles. It is located on the Tidan River, the only river in Sweden that flows north. Two islands are included within the municipality's limits: Vulcanön and Turbinhusön, the former was originally Tidaholm's industrial center and the latter historically housed the Turbine. As of 2021, there were 13,000 inhabitants.

== History ==
Historically, the city was known as Agnetorp. Tidaholm was detached from Baltak parish as a merchant town (köping) in 1895. In 1910, it was established as the city of Tidaholm, and it has served as the seat of the much larger Tidaholm Municipality since 1974. In 1997, its county name changed as well, when Skaraborg County merged with the counties of Gothenburg, Bohus and Älvsborg to form Västra Götaland County.

Up until the early 19th century, Tidaholm was primarily a farming community but, in 1799, an ironworks factory (Tidaholms bruk) was established on the site of the Holmagården forge, which had roots dating back to the Middle Ages, and merged with several other business to manufacture furniture, wagons and agricultural implements. Nearly a century later, one of the bicycle-making Lindström brothers spent time in the United States, studying the early car industry. Once he returned to Sweden, the Tidaholmsbilen (the Tidaholm car) was the result, with most of the parts made at Tidaholms Bruk, especially once local engine production began in 1914. Between 1903 and 1934, the factory produced about 6,000 cars, mainly trucks, buses, fire trucks and other heavy vehicles. Known as "Tidaholmarna," they were seen as far afield as Oslo and St. Petersburg.

In 1868, the Vulcan match factory (Tändsticksfabrik AB Vulcan), was founded on Vulcan Island, one of Tidaholm's islands in the Tidan River. Although it was started with a little over 100 workers, by the early 1900s, it had become the largest manufacturer of matches in the world, and was employing more than 1,000 workers. Nowadays, Vulcan Tidaholm is the only remaining match factory in Sweden, with roughly 200 employees. Although the Lithographic Art Workshop has taken over its former headquarters, it carries on Tidaholm's tradition of the lithographic arts that began with the design of intricate matchbox labels.

== Industrial gallery ==
(Selection was limited by availability.)

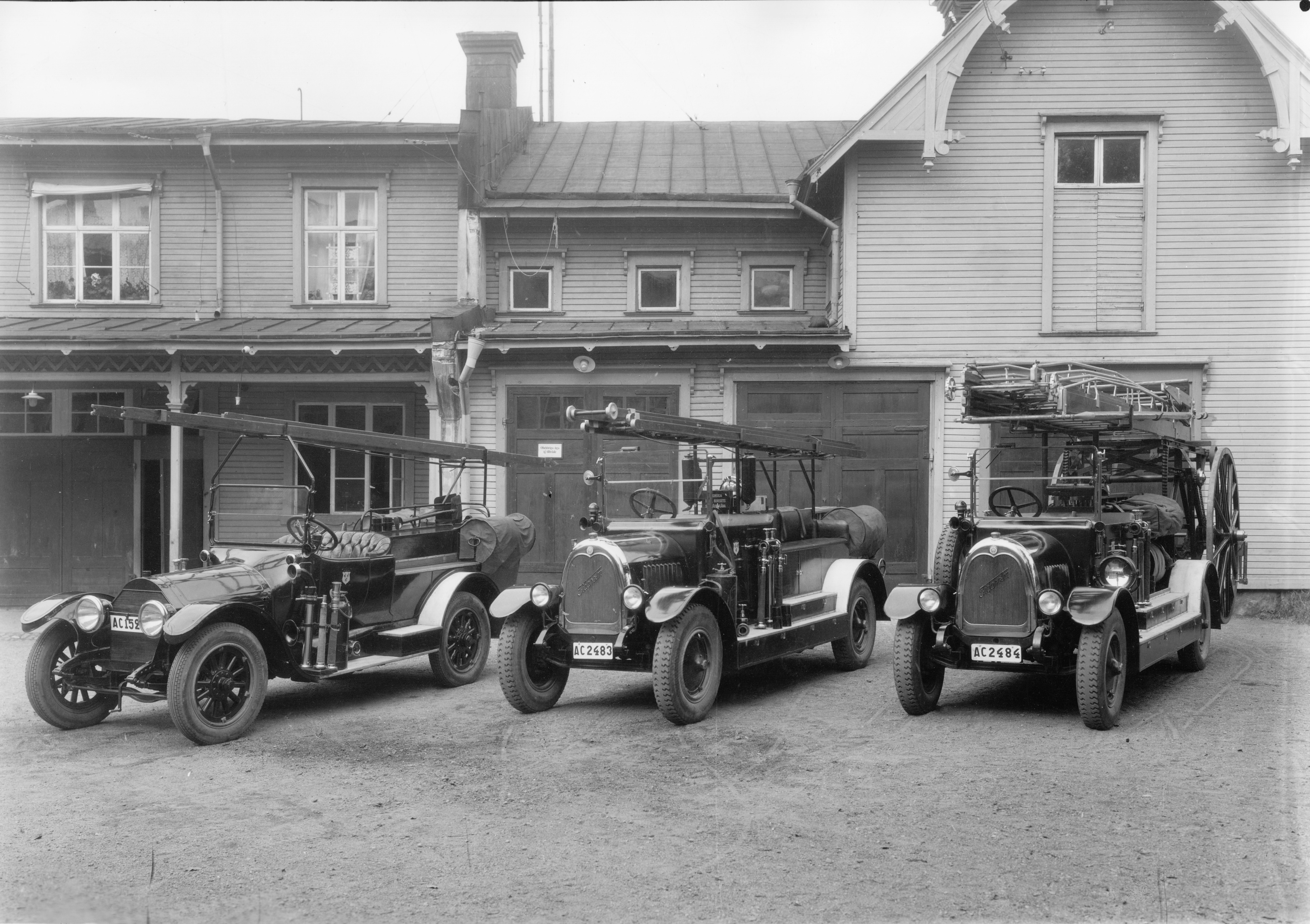
The city's first fire trucks, in the late 1920s.

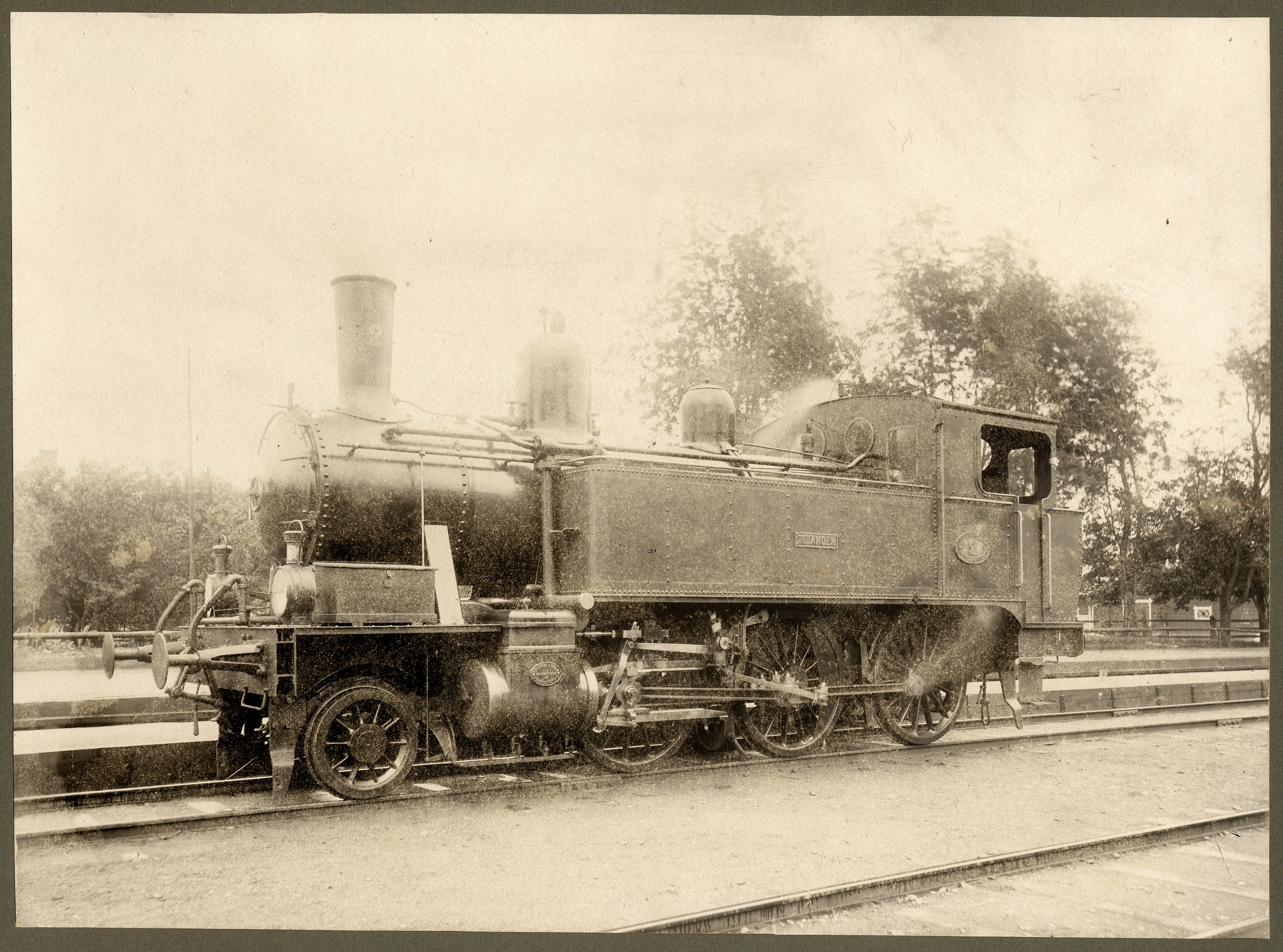
A Tidaholm steam locomotive, 1906.

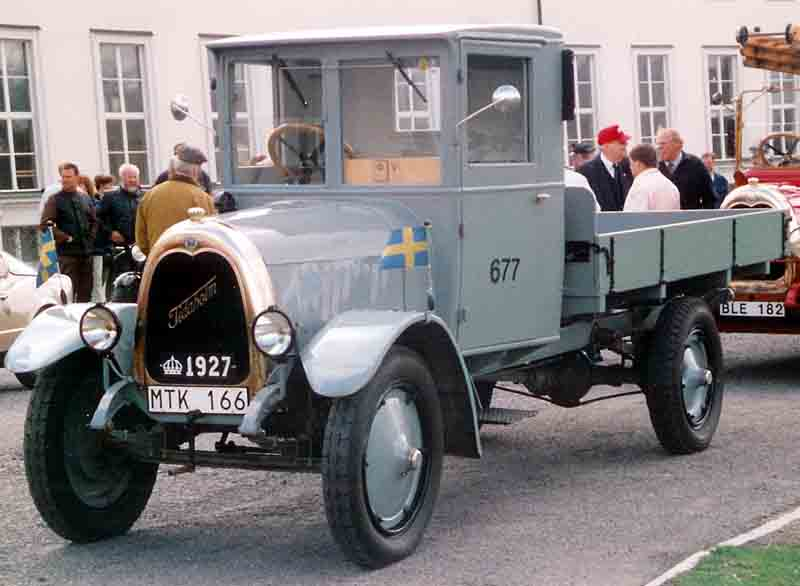
A Tidaholm truck from 1927.

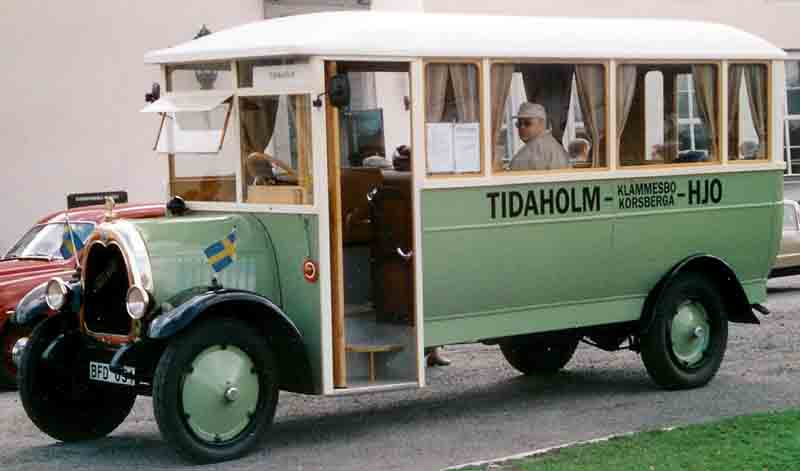
A Tidaholm bus from 1925.

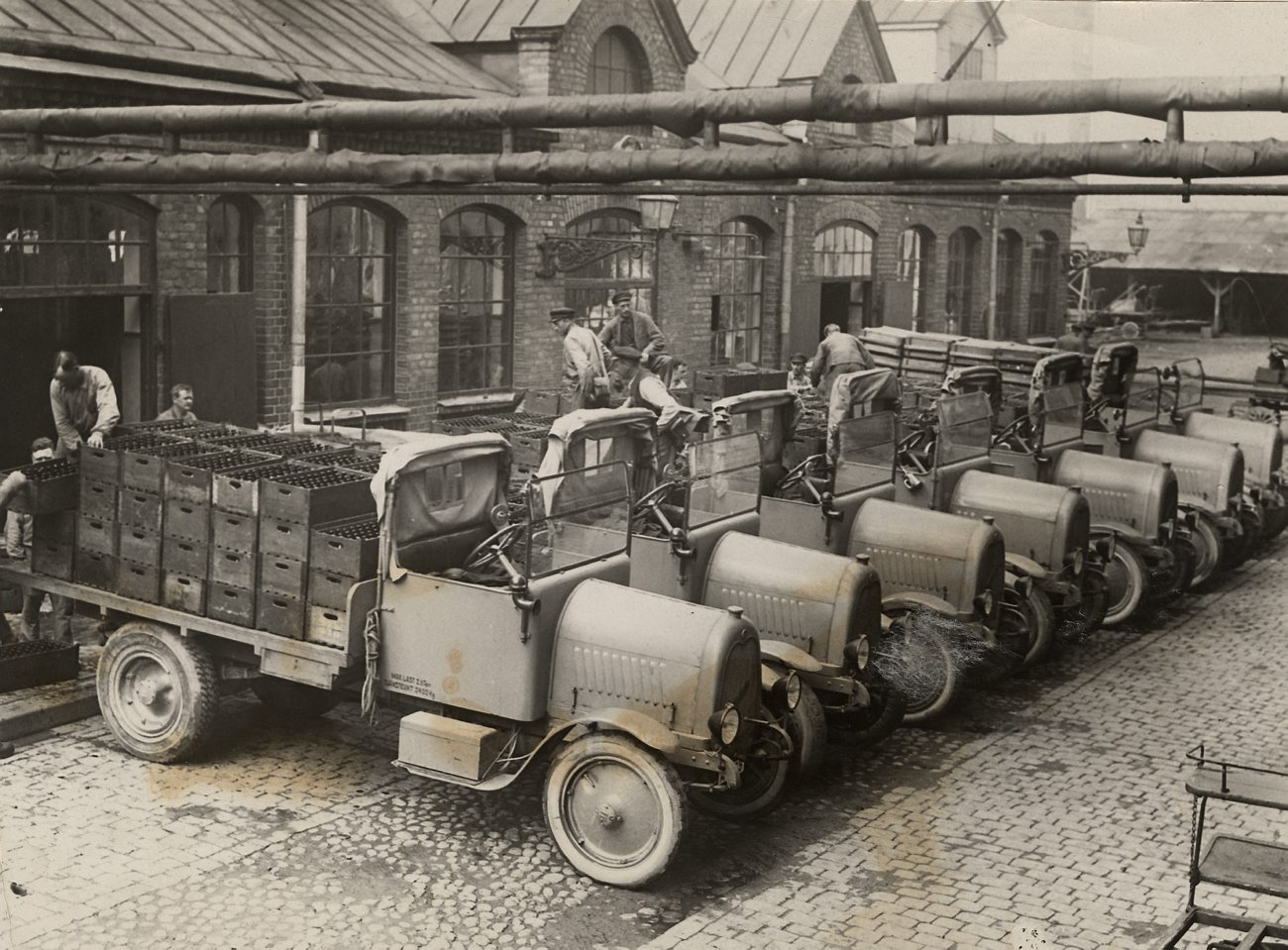
Tidaholm delivery trucks, n.d.

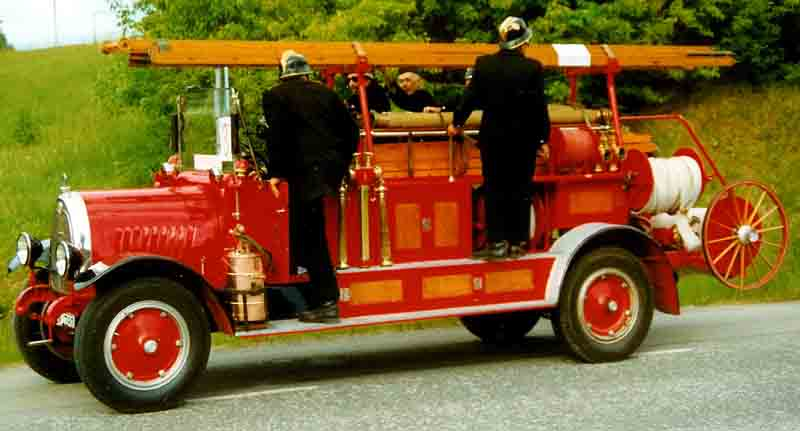
Tidaholm fire engine from 1929.

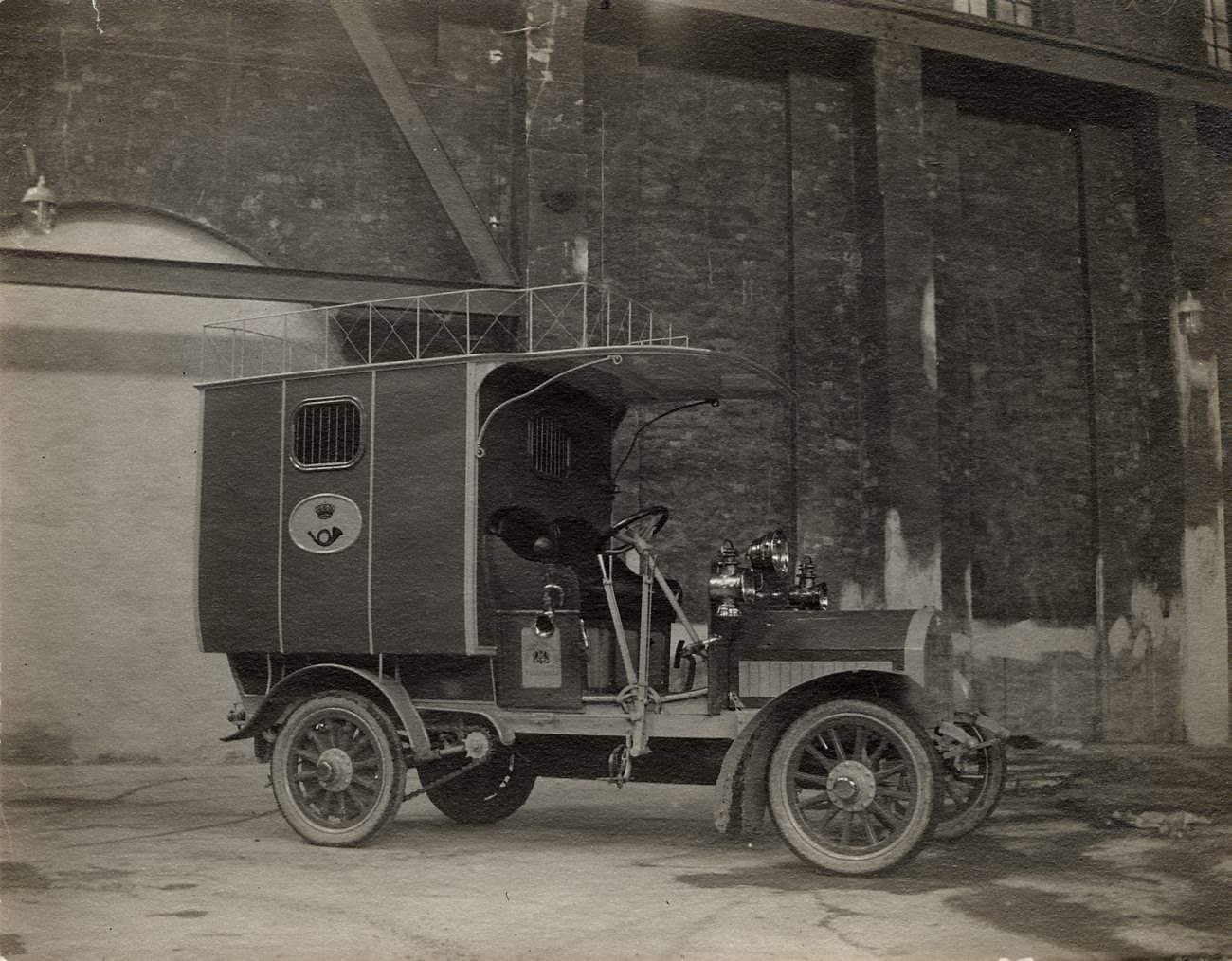
A Tidaholm mail truck from 1912.

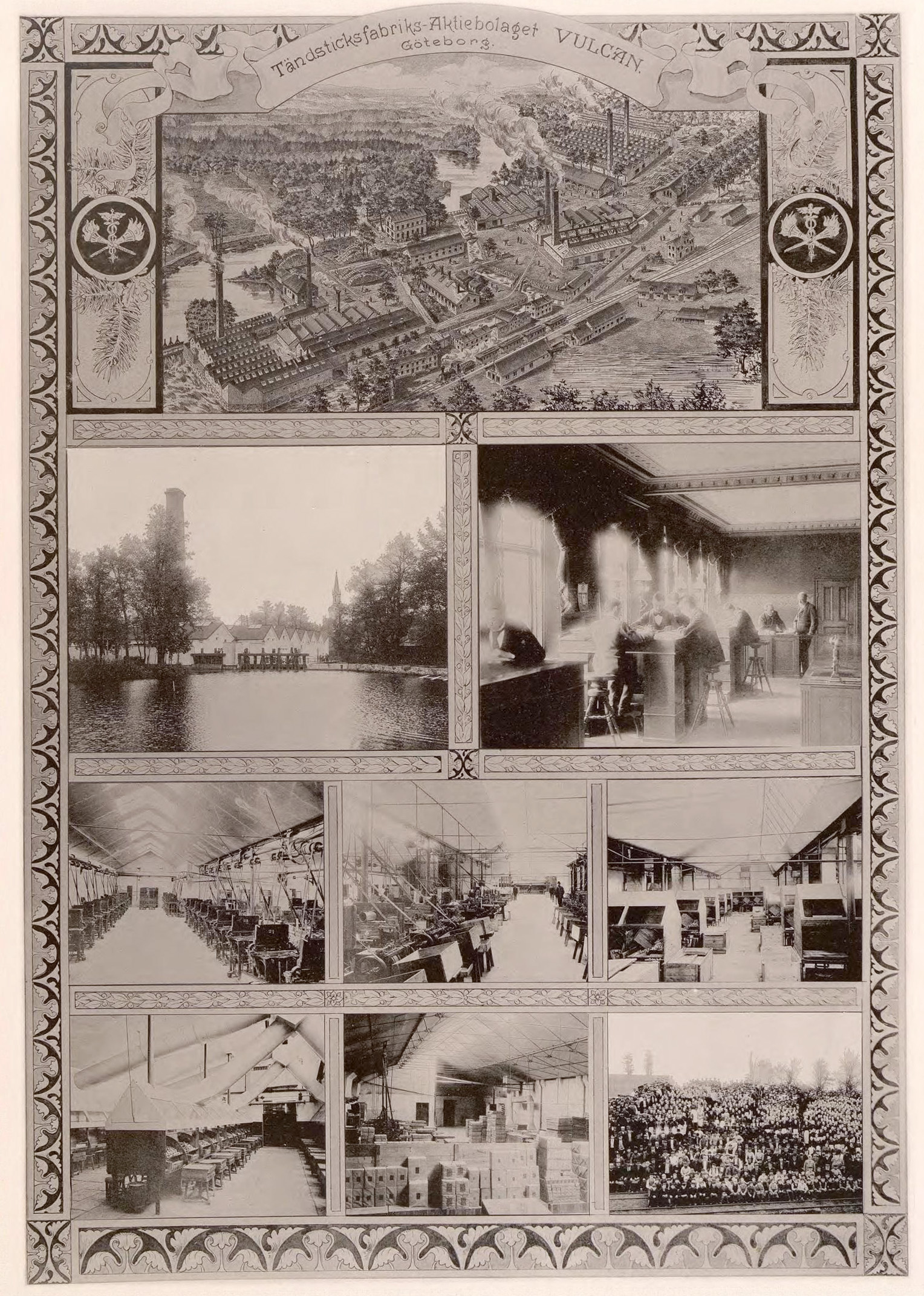
A Vulcan poster, from 1894 to 1907.

== The islands ==
(Selection was limited by availability.)

=== Vulcanön island ===
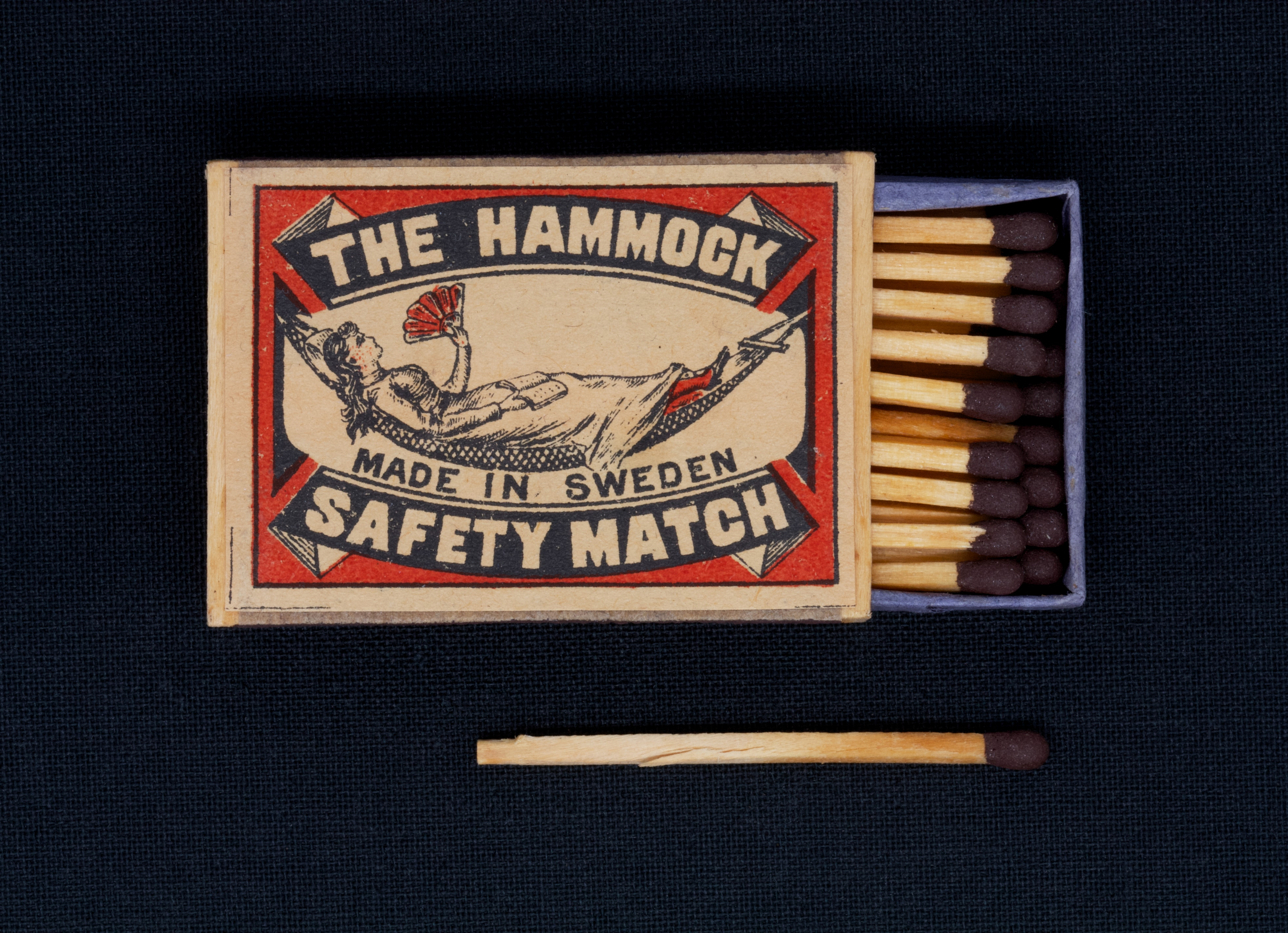
Vulcan's Hammock line, 1903.

Both Tidaholm Bruk as well as Vulcan Tidaholm were headquartered on Vulcanön island and, nowadays, Tidaholm Museum is located here. Not surprisingly, the museum focuses on the town's industrial history and its two major industries, and it keeps nine Tidaholm Bruk cars on permanent display. Although many buildings were demolished in the area, a lot of historic architecture remains.

=== Turbinhusön island ===
There is an art gallery at the former turbine house (Turbinhusön) open in the summer and close to Hellidens folkhögskola you will find Sweden's only Lithographic Museum, as well as cafés and other small shops here.

== Sites ==
- Gamla Torget — Gamla Torget is effectively the city square. Surrounded by many historic 19th century buildings, it functions as a key gathering place for many local events.
- Idrottshistoriska Museet — The Sports Museum documents the history of local sports, celebrating the achievements of local athletes and sports teams.
- Tidaholms Stadsbibliotek — The public library is housed in a renaissance building from the end of the 19th century. It is also a location for temporary exhibitions.

== Architectural gallery ==
(Selection was limited by availability.)

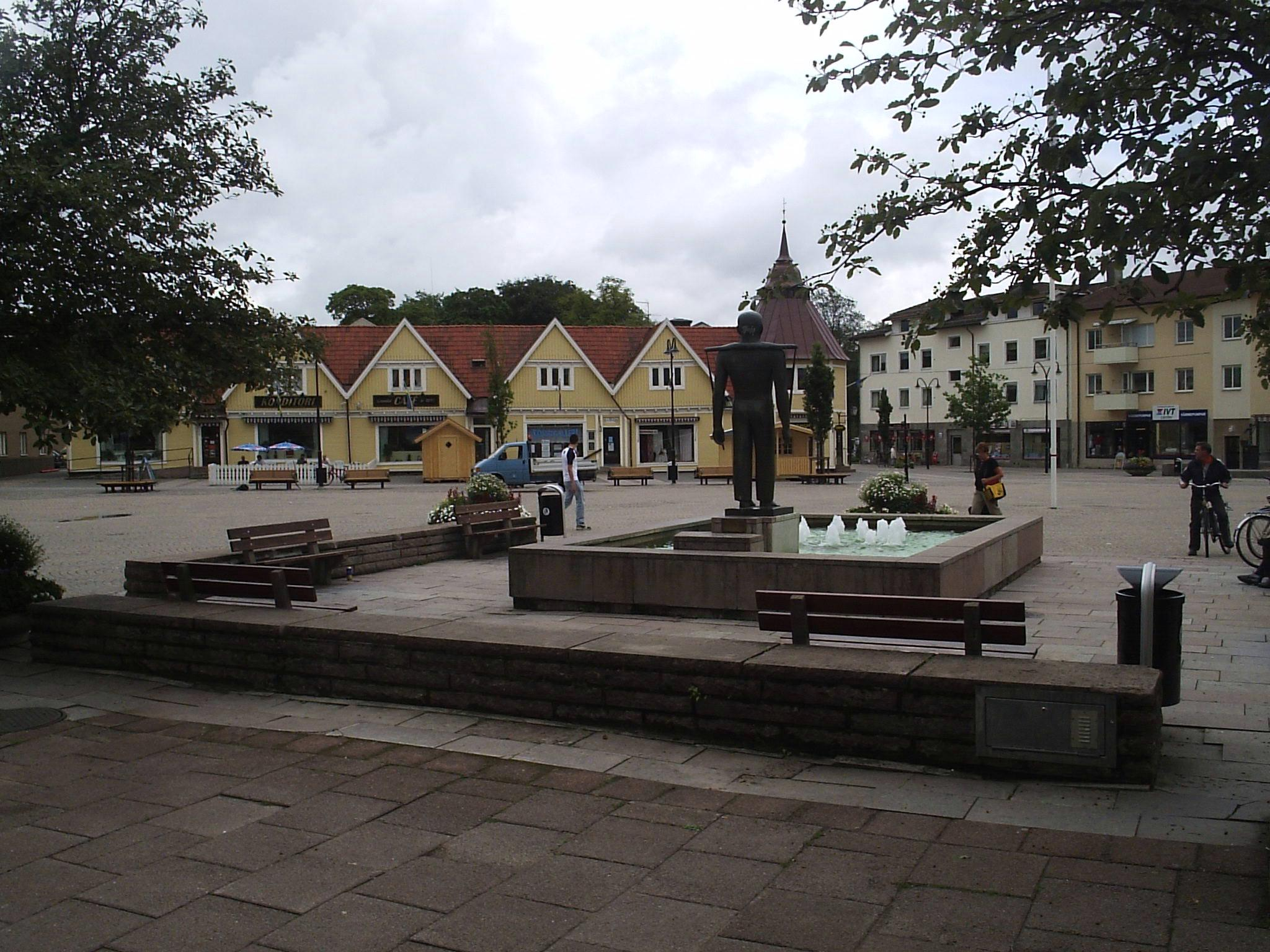
Tidaholm's town square.

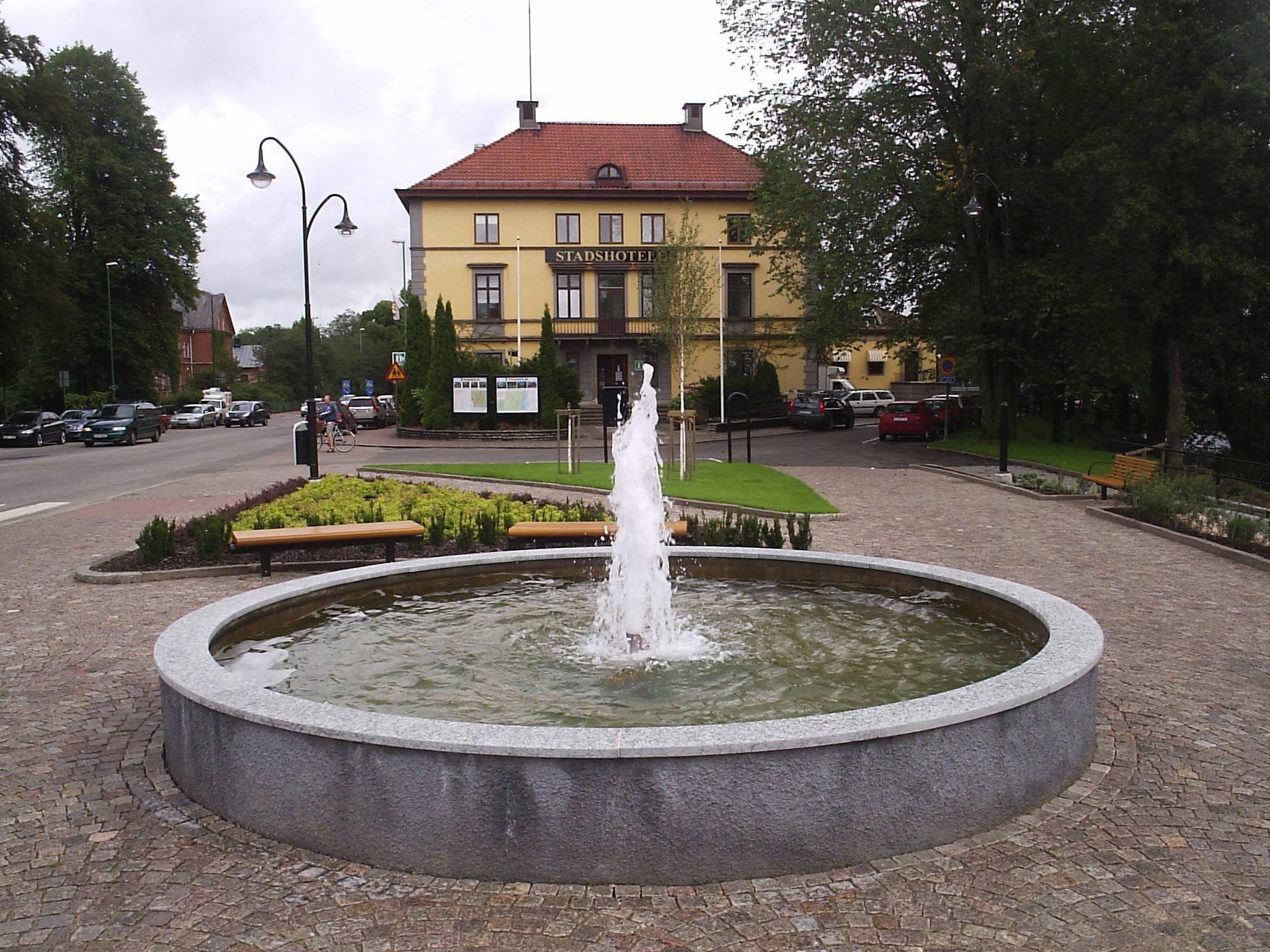
The City Hall, designed by Gotthard Ålander. Photo by Harri Blomberg.

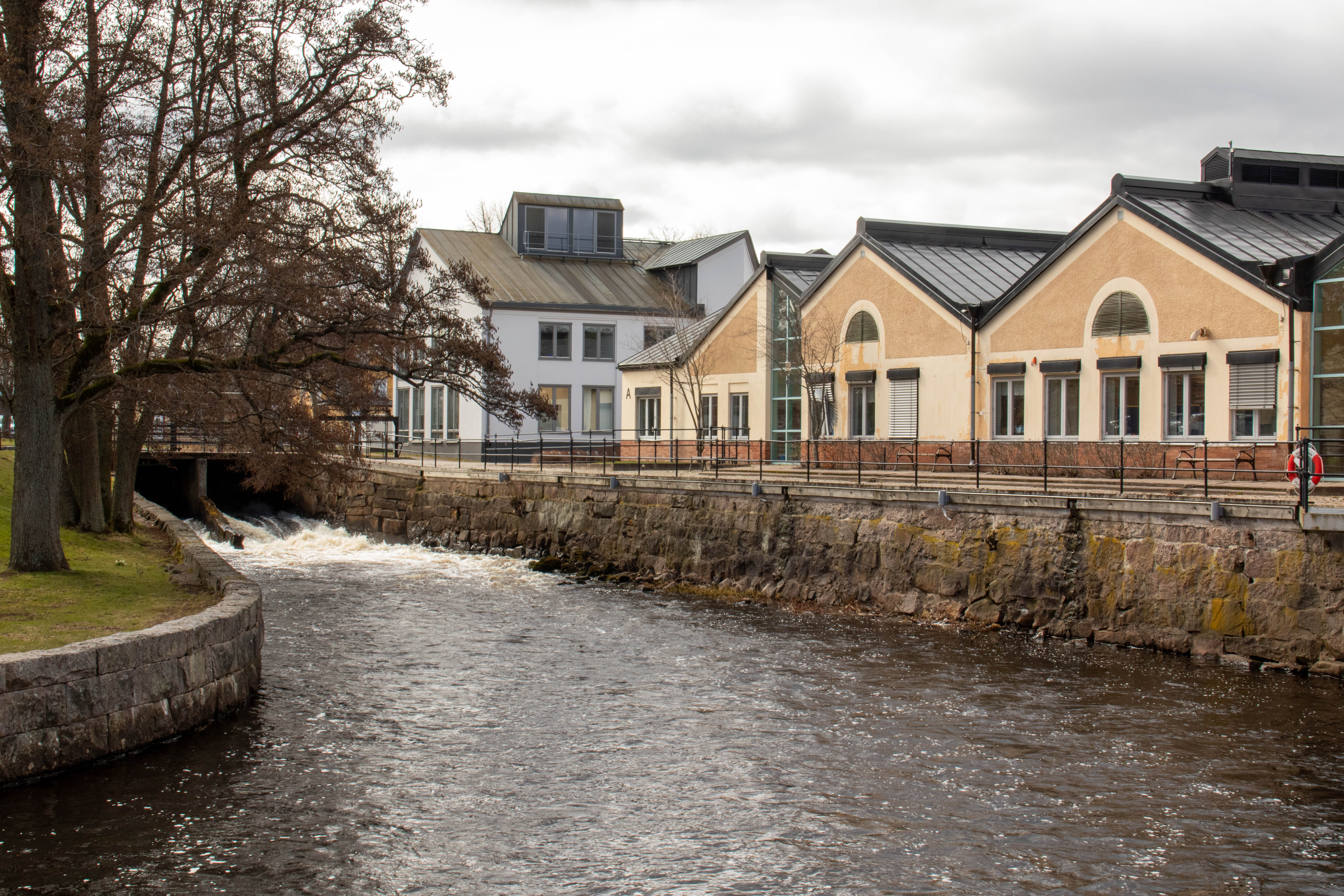
Rudbeck High School (Rudbecksgymnasiet) in Tidaholm, along the Tidan River.

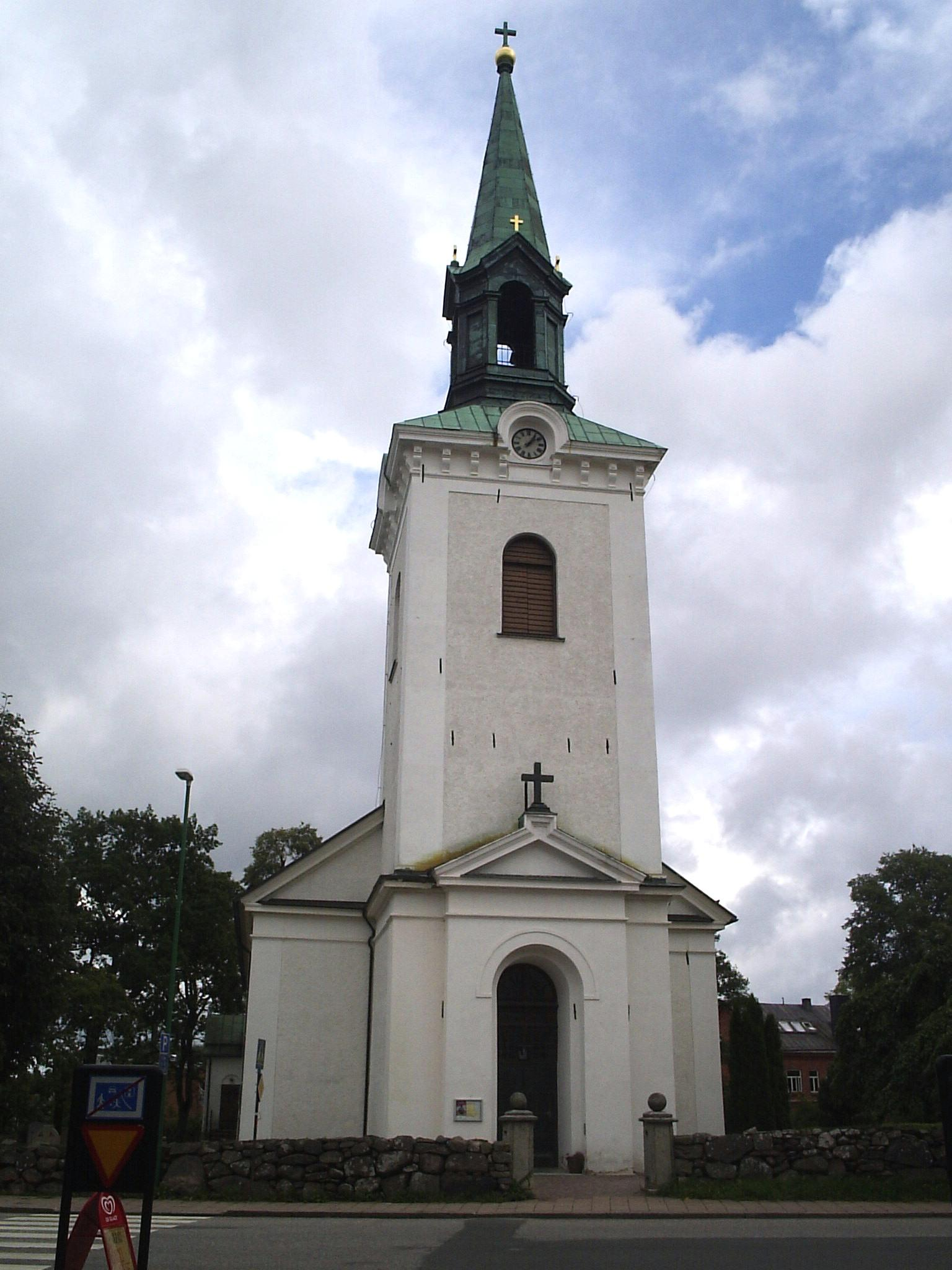
Tidaholm Church.

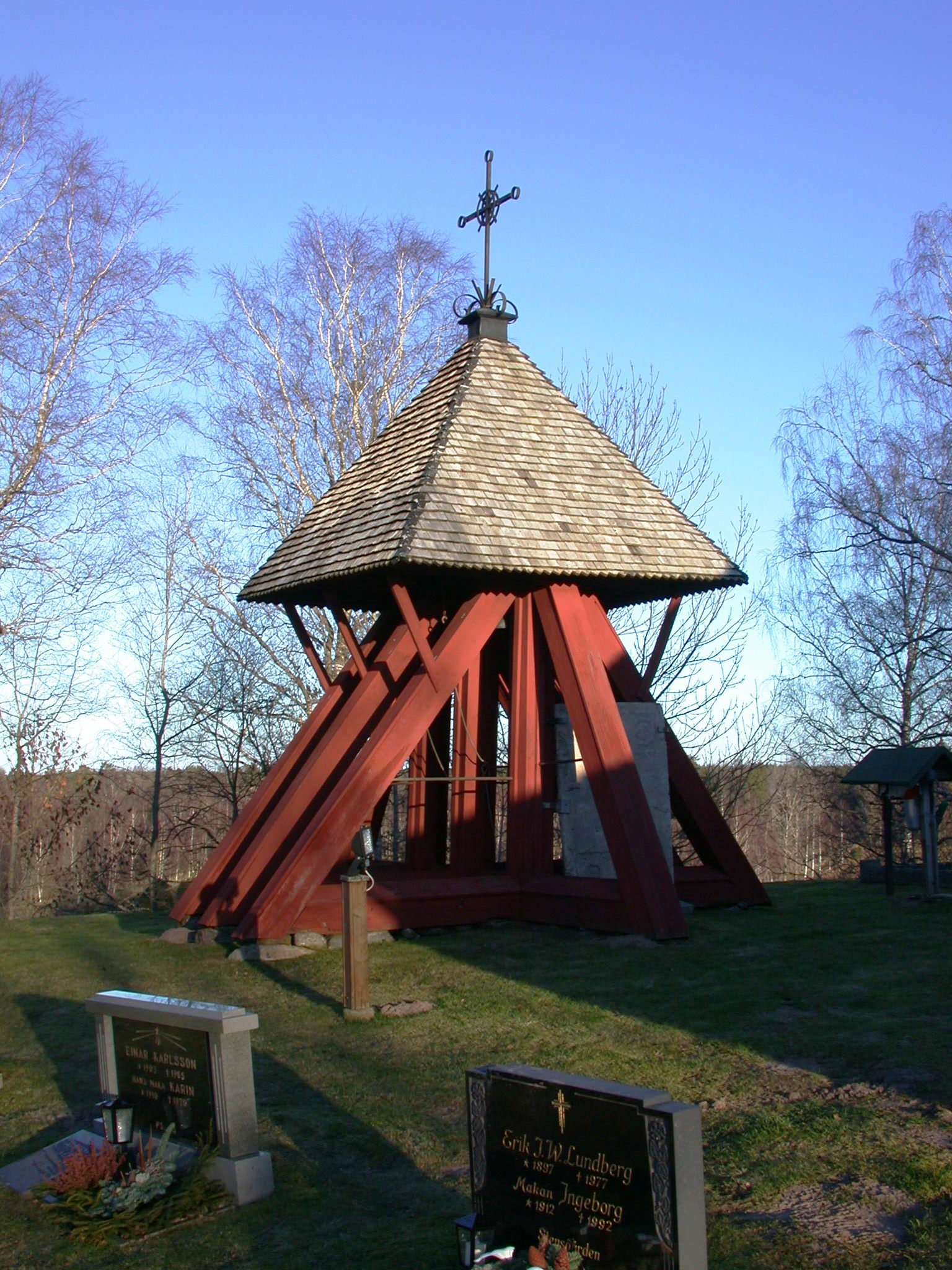
The Vättak Church belfry.

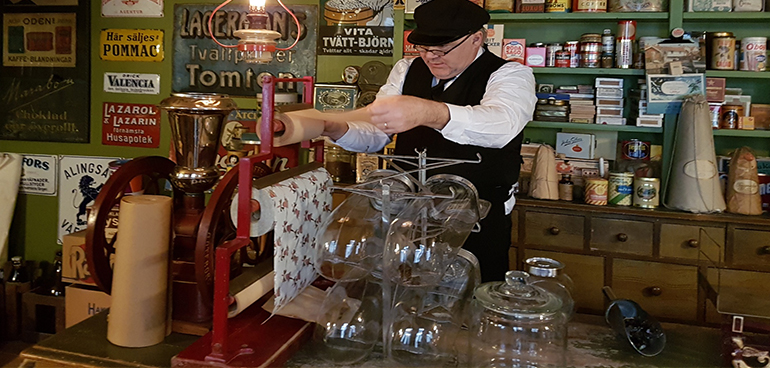
Varola's old general store was donated to the Tidaholm Museum.

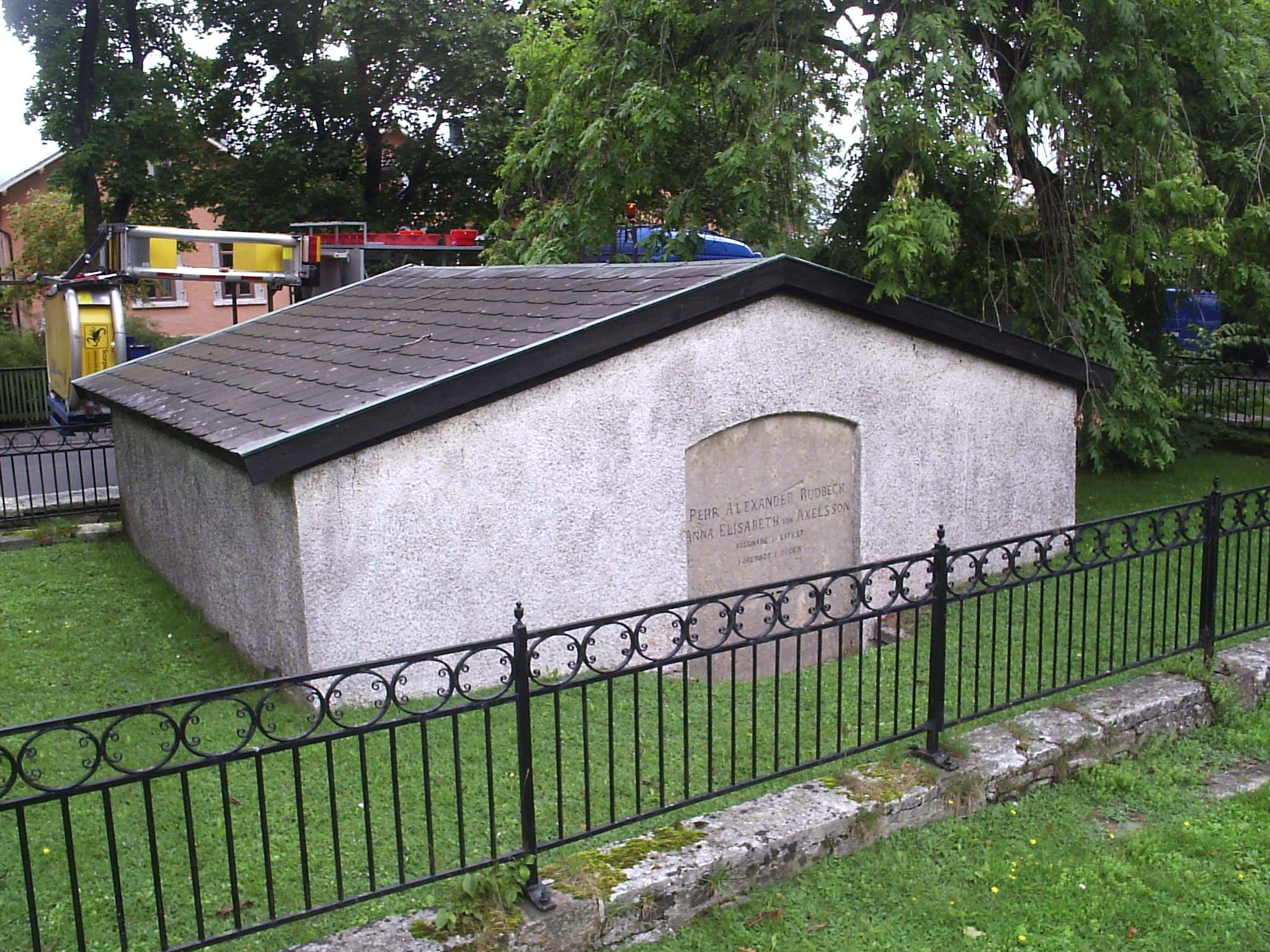
Site of Agnetorp Parish ruins in Tidaholm.

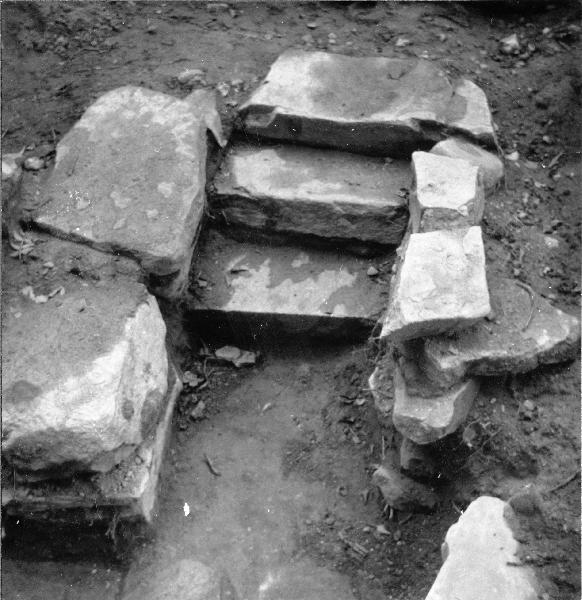
Agnetorp Parish ruins in Tidaholm.

== Greater Tidaholm ==
=== Helliden Castle ===
Hans Henrik Von Essen was both one of the owners of Tidaholm Bruk and a founder of Vulcan Tidaholm. He first built Helliden, a manor house, colloquially known as Helliden Castle, at the edge of the municipality in 1858. Today, it houses a high school and an adult education center.
