= Japanese submarine chaser Cha-214 =

History

Imperial Japanese Navy
- Name: Cha-214
- Builder: Shikoku Funabashi Kogyosho Co., Ltd, Takamatsu
- Laid down: 10 June 1944
- Launched: 21 September 1944
- Completed: 8 December 1944
- Commissioned: 8 December 1944
- Decommissioned: 30 November 1945
- Fate: mobilized by the Allied occupation forces, 1 December 1945

Allied Occupation Force
- Acquired: 1 December 1945
- Decommissioned: 15 June 1946
- Fate: transferred to Ministry of Transportation, 1 January 1948

Ministry of Transportation
- Acquired: 1 January 1948
- Fate: transferred to Japan Maritime Safety Agency, 1 May 1948

Japan Maritime Safety Agency
- Acquired: 1 May 1948
- Renamed: Minesweeper No. 214 (MS-15), 20 August 1948; Minesweeper Special No. 214 (MS-15), 20 October 1949; Hayatori (MS-15), 1 December 1951
- Fate: transferred to the Coastal Safety Force, 1 August 1952

Japan Coastal Safety Force
- Acquired: 1 August 1952
- Fate: transferred to Japan Maritime Self-Defense Force, 1 July 1954

Japan Maritime Self-Defense Force
- Acquired: 1 July 1954
- Decommissioned: 31 April 1965
- Renamed: Hayatori (MSI-699), 1 September 1957
- Fate: unknown

General characteristics
- Class & type: No.1-class submarine chaser
- Displacement: 130 long tons (132 t) standard
- Length: 29.20 m (95 ft 10 in) overall
- Beam: 5.65 m (18 ft 6 in)
- Draught: 1.97 m (6 ft 6 in)
- Propulsion: 1 × intermediate diesel; shingle shaft, 400 bhp (300 kW)
- Speed: 11.0 knots (20.4 km/h; 12.7 mph)
- Range: 1,000 nmi (1,900 km; 1,200 mi) at 10.0 kn (18.5 km/h; 11.5 mph)
- Complement: 32
- Armament: 1 × 13.2 mm machine gun; 22 × depth charges; 1 × dunking hydrophone; 1 × simple sonar

Cha-214 or No. 214 (Japanese: 第二百十四號驅潜特務艇) was a No.1-class auxiliary submarine chaser of the Imperial Japanese Navy that served during World War II.

== History ==
She was laid down on 10 June 1944 as ship 2064 at the Takamatsu shipyard of Shikoku Funabashi Kogyosho Co., Ltd. (株式會社四国船渠工業所) and launched on 21 September 1944. She was completed and commissioned on 8 December 1944, fitted with armaments at the Kure Naval Arsenal, and assigned to the Saiki Defense Unit, Kure Naval District. On 7 April 1945, she was assigned to the 2nd minesweeping division. On 10 April 1945, she was attached to the Shanghai Base Force (上海方面根據地隊所属), China Area Fleet (jp:支那方面艦隊) and assigned to patrol, escort, and minesweeping activities in the Tsushima Strait. On 5 June 1945, she was assigned to the Shimonoseki Defense Force, Sasebo Naval District under the newly formed 7th Fleet. Cha-214 survived the war and was decommissioned on 30 November 1945.

On 1 December 1945, she was enrolled as a minesweeper by the occupation forces, one of 269 Japanese ships that served as a minesweeper under the Allied forces after the war. On 15 June 1946, she was demobilized. On 1 January 1948, she was released to the Ministry of Transportation.

On 1 May 1948, she was assigned to the Japan Maritime Safety Agency, a sub-agency of the Ministry of Transportation, and designated on 20 August 1948 as Minesweeper No. 214 (MS-15). On 20 October 1949, she was re-designated as Minesweeper Special No. 214 (MS-15) and on 1 December 1951 she was assigned the name Hayatori (はやとり) (MS-15). On 1 August 1952, she was assigned to the Coastal Safety Force. She served as part of the Special Minesweeping Corps (jp:日本特別掃海隊) during the Korean War. On 1 July 1954, she was transferred to the newly created Japan Maritime Self-Defense Force and re-designated on 1 September 1957 as Hayatori (MSI-699). She was delisted on 31 April 1965.
