= Japanese submarine chaser Cha-217 =

History

Imperial Japanese Navy
- Name: Cha-217
- Builder: Miho Shipyard Co. Ltd., Shimizu
- Laid down: 26 April 1944
- Launched: 1944
- Completed: 6 December 1944
- Commissioned: 6 December 1944
- Decommissioned: 15 September 1945
- Home port: Shimonoseki
- Fate: released to the Ministry of Transportation, 28 August 1947

Japan Maritime Safety Agency
- Acquired: 1 May 1948
- Renamed: Tsugumi (PB-07), 20 August 1948
- Fate: transferred to Japan Maritime Self-Defense Force, 1 May 1954

Japan Maritime Self-Defense Force
- Acquired: 1 May 1954
- Decommissioned: 16 January 1961
- Renamed: Tsugumi (PB-127)
- Fate: unknown

General characteristics
- Class & type: No.1-class submarine chaser
- Displacement: 130 long tons (132 t) standard
- Length: 29.20 m (95 ft 10 in) overall
- Beam: 5.65 m (18 ft 6 in)
- Draught: 1.97 m (6 ft 6 in)
- Propulsion: 1 × intermediate diesel; shingle shaft, 400 bhp
- Speed: 11.0 knots (20.4 km/h; 12.7 mph)
- Range: 1,000 nmi (1,900 km; 1,200 mi) at 10.0 kn (18.5 km/h; 11.5 mph)
- Complement: 32
- Armament: 1 × 13.2 mm machine gun; 22 × depth charges; 1 × dunking hydrophone; 1 × simple sonar

Cha-217 or No. 217 (Japanese: 第二百十七號驅潜特務艇) was a No.1-class auxiliary submarine chaser of the Imperial Japanese Navy that served during World War II.

== History ==
She was laid down on 26 April 1944 at the Shimizu shipyard of Miho Shipyard Co. Ltd. (株式會社三保造船所) and launched later in the year. She was completed and commissioned on 6 December 1944, fitted with armaments at the Yokosuka Naval Arsenal, and assigned to the Yokosuka Defense Unit, Yokosuka Naval District. In March 1945, Captain Masakichi Inoue was appointed as commanding officer and she was assigned to the Shimonoseki Defense Force, 7th Fleet.

She mostly conducted patrol and minesweeping duties in and around the Kanmon Straits and the Tsushima Strait. Cha-217 survived the war and was decommissioned on 15 September 1945.

On 1 December 1945, she was demobilized and enrolled as a minesweeper by the occupation forces. On 28 August 1947, she was released to the Ministry of Transportation. On 1 May 1948, she was assigned to the Japan Maritime Safety Agency, a sub-agency of the Ministry of Transportation, and designated on 20 August 1948 as patrol boat 07 (PB-07) with the name Tsugumi (つぐみ). On 1 July 1949, she was re-designated patrol ship 7 (PS-07) using the same name Tsugumi. On 1 May 1954, she was transferred to the newly created Japan Maritime Self-Defense Force and designated as Tsugumi (PB-127). She was delisted on 16 January 1961.
