= Japanese submarine chaser Cha-246 =

History

Imperial Japanese Navy
- Name: Cha-246
- Builder: Yamanishi Shipbuilding Co., Ltd. Ishinomaki
- Laid down: 30 August 1944
- Launched: 8 October 1944
- Completed: 22 January 1945
- Commissioned: 22 January 1945
- Decommissioned: 30 December 1945
- Home port: Sasebo
- Fate: transferred to Japan Maritime Safety Agency, 1 January 1948

History

Japan Maritime Safety Agency
- Name: MS-05
- Acquired: 1 January 1948
- Renamed: Yamabato, 1 December 1951
- Home port: Sasebo
- Fate: transferred to Japan Maritime Self-Defense Force, 1 September 1954

History

Japan Maritime Self-Defense Force
- Name: Yamabato
- Acquired: 1 July 1954
- Decommissioned: 1 June 1958
- Home port: Osaka
- Fate: unknown

General characteristics
- Class & type: No.1-class Submarine chaser
- Displacement: 130 long tons (132 t) standard
- Length: 29.20 m (95 ft 10 in) overall
- Beam: 5.65 m (18 ft 6 in)
- Draught: 1.97 m (6 ft 6 in)
- Propulsion: 1 × intermediate diesel; shingle shaft, 400 bhp
- Speed: 11.0 knots (12.7 mph; 20.4 km/h)
- Range: 1,000 nmi (1,900 km) at 10.0 kn (11.5 mph; 18.5 km/h)
- Complement: 32
- Armament: 1 × 13.2mm machine gun; 22 × depth charges; 1 × dunking hydrophone; 1 × simple sonar

Cha-246 or No. 246 (Japanese: 第二百四十六號驅潜特務艇) was a No.1-class auxiliary submarine chaser of the Imperial Japanese Navy that served during World War II.

== History ==
She was laid down on 30 August 1944 at the Ishinomaki shipyard of Yamanishi Shipbuilding Co., Ltd. (jp:ヤマニシ) and launched on 8 October 1944. She was fitted with armaments at the Kure Naval Arsenal; completed and commissioned on 22 January 1945; and assigned to the Osaka Guard Force, First Fleet. On 15 June 1945, she was assigned to the Sasebo Guard Force, Shimonoseki Defense Team, Seventh Fleet. She survived the war. On 30 December 1945, she was demobilized and assigned to mine-sweeping duties by the occupying forces.

On 1 January 1948, she was assigned to the Japan Maritime Safety Agency as a minesweeper and designated MS-05 on 1 May 1948. On 1 December 1951, she was renamed Yamabato (まばと) and served during the Korean War. On 1 July 1954, she was transferred to the newly created Japan Maritime Self-Defense Force. On 1 April 1956, she was designated Special Affairs Boat No.2 (MS-05) and on 31 March 1957, as Special Agent Boat No. 6 (YAS-06). She was delisted on 1 June 1958.
