= Japanese submarine chaser Cha-222 =

History

Imperial Japanese Navy
- Name: Cha-222
- Builder: Fukushima Shipbuilding Iron Works, Matsue
- Laid down: 28 April 1944
- Launched: 1 November 1944
- Completed: 19 November 1944
- Commissioned: 19 November 1944
- Decommissioned: 30 November 1945
- Home port: Saiki, Ōita
- Fate: released to the Ministry of Transportation, 1 January 1948

Japan Maritime Safety Agency
- Acquired: 5 May 1948
- Renamed: Minesweeper No. 222 (MS-03), 20 August 1948; Hatsutaka (MS-03), 1 December 1951
- Fate: transferred to Japan Maritime Self-Defense Force, 1 September 1954

Japan Maritime Self-Defense Force
- Acquired: 1 September 1954
- Decommissioned: 31 March 1962
- Renamed: Hatsutaka (MSI-696), 1 September 1957
- Fate: unknown

General characteristics
- Class & type: No.1-class submarine chaser
- Displacement: 130 long tons (132 t) standard
- Length: 29.20 m (95 ft 10 in) overall
- Beam: 5.65 m (18 ft 6 in)
- Draught: 1.97 m (6 ft 6 in)
- Propulsion: 1 × intermediate diesel; shingle shaft, 400 bhp (300 kW)
- Speed: 11.0 knots (20.4 km/h; 12.7 mph)
- Range: 1,000 nmi (1,900 km; 1,200 mi) at 10.0 kn (18.5 km/h; 11.5 mph)
- Complement: 32
- Armament: 1 × 13.2 mm machine gun; 22 × depth charges; 1 × dunking hydrophone; 1 × simple sonar

Cha-222 or No. 222 (Japanese: 第二百二十二號驅潜特務艇) was a No.1-class auxiliary submarine chaser of the Imperial Japanese Navy that served during World War II.

== History ==
She was laid down on 28 April 1944 at the Matsue shipyard of Fukushima Shipbuilding Iron Works (福島造船鉄工所) and launched on 1 November 1944. She was completed and commissioned on 19 November 1944, fitted with armaments at the Kure Naval Arsenal, and assigned to the Saiki Defense Unit, Kure Defense Force, Kure Naval District. In December 1944, Captain Tashiro Doi was appointed as commanding officer and on 24 March 1945, she was put under the control of the Imperial Japanese Army serving at Shimonoseki for minesweeping duty. On 7 April 1945, she was assigned to the 1st Special Minesweeping Division. On 11 April 1945, she towed Cha-215 and Cha-230 to Yoshimi, Saitama after they had been disabled by mines. On 12 June 1945, she was released from Army control and reassigned to the Kure Defense Force again operating out of Saiki. Cha-222 survived the war and was decommissioned on 30 November 1945.

On 1 December 1945, she was demobilized and enrolled as a minesweeper by the occupation forces. On 1 January 1948, she was released to the Ministry of Transportation. On 5 May 1948, she was assigned to the Japan Maritime Safety Agency, a sub-agency of the Ministry of Transportation, and designated on 20 August 1948 as Minesweeper No. 222 (MS-03). On 1 December 1951 she was assigned the name Hatsutaka (はつたか) (MS-03). She served as part of the Special Minesweeping Corps (jp:日本特別掃海隊) during the Korean War, first with the 2nd Mine Warfare Force (along with MS-06, MS-14, MS-17, PS-02, PS-04, PS-08) and later the 5th Mine Warfare Force (along with MS-21, MS-06, MS-08, PS-58) under Captain Ryohei Oga (jp:大賀良平). On 1 September 1954, she was transferred to the newly created Japan Maritime Self-Defense Force and re-designated on 1 September 1957 as Hatsutaka (MSI-696). She was delisted on 31 March 1962.
