= Sentarō Ōmori =

Japanese admiral (1892–1974)

- 大森 仙太郎
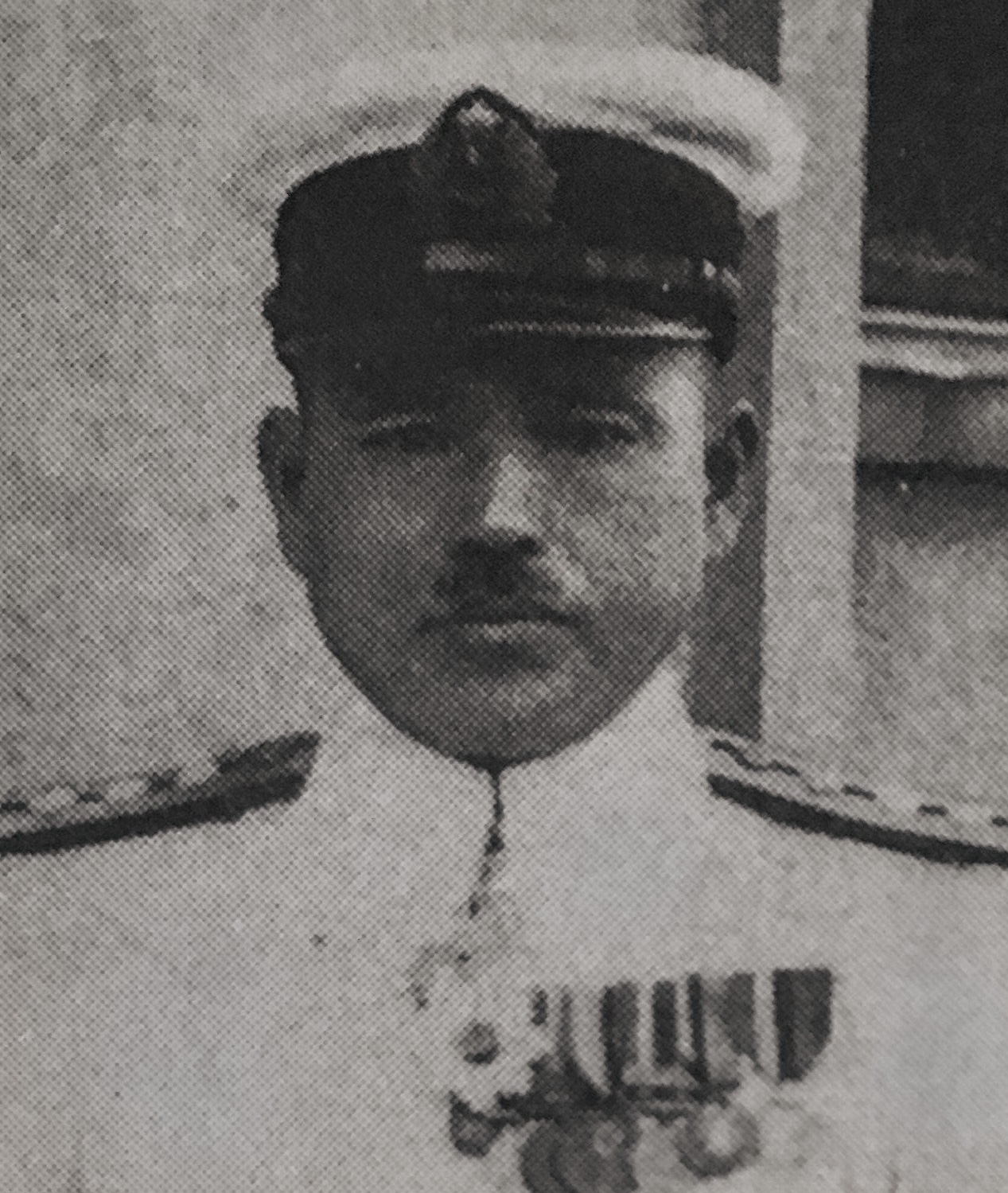
- Born: 3 October 1892; Kumamoto Prefecture, Japan
- Died: 24 December 1974 (aged 82)
- Alma mater: Imperial Japanese Naval Academy
- Military career
- Allegiance: Empire of Japan
- Branch: Imperial Japanese Navy
- Service years: 1913–1945
- Rank: Vice Admiral
- Commands: Hibiki, Namikaze, Kamikaze, Yugiri, 16th Destroyer Division, 21st Destroyer Division, Kamikawa Maru, Ise, 1st Destroyer Squadron, 5th Squadron, Naval Torpedo School, 7th Fleet
- Conflicts: World War II; Pacific War; Attack on Pearl Harbor; Indian Ocean Raid; Battle of the Aleutian Islands; Battle of Empress Augusta Bay

Sentarō Ōmori (大森 仙太郎, Ōmori Sentarō; 3 October 1892 – 24 December 1974), was an admiral in the Imperial Japanese Navy during World War II.

== Biography ==
=== Early life ===
Ōmori was born in Kumamoto prefecture and graduated from the 41st class of the Imperial Japanese Naval Academy in 1913. He was ranked 16th out of 118 cadets. He served his midshipman duty aboard the cruiser Azuma, battleships Kongō and Iwami, and was commissioned as an ensign in 1914. He subsequently served on the battleship Yamashiro and destroyer Shirayuki.

Ōmori returned to school, and became a torpedo expert. He served as lieutenant on the destroyers Ashi and Nokaze and the battleship Mutsu before being given his first command on 1 December 1923: the destroyer Hibiki.

Through the 1920 and 1930s, Ōmori subsequently commanded the destroyers Namikaze, Kamikaze and Yugiri, seaplane tender Kamikawa Maru, and finally the battleship Ise from 1939–1940, while steadily increasing in rank and returning at regular intervals to torpedo school to remain expert on the latest developments in torpedo technology and tactics. He was promoted to rear admiral on 15 November 1940.

=== World War II ===
At the start of World War II, Ōmori was in command of Destroyer Squadron 1 (DesRon1), which accompanied the main strike force during the attack on Pearl Harbor. It also participated in the Indian Ocean Raid of early 1942. During the Battle of Midway, DesRon1 directed the occupation of Attu Island in the Battle of the Aleutian Islands. Omori was given command of Cruiser Division 5 (CruDiv5). Assigned to the Solomon Islands, he was ordered to attack American transports off Bougainville Island in early November 1943. In the resultant Battle of Empress Augusta Bay of 1–2 November 1943, the Japanese forces (heavy cruisers Myōkō and Haguro, light cruisers Agano and Sendai, and destroyers Shigure, Samidare, Shiratsuyu, Naganami, Hatsukaze, and Wakatsuki) suffered a decisive defeat. Ōmori and his heavy cruisers narrowly escaped damage in an air raid at Rabaul, New Britain the following day, and retreated to the main Japanese base at Truk, Caroline Islands. Ōmori was relieved of his command for having withdrawn at Empress Augusta Bay against an inferior force and was sent back to Japan.

Ōmori became Commandant of the Naval Torpedo School, and was promoted to vice admiral on 1 May 1944. He was director of the Special Attack Division from 13 September 1944–10 August 1945, supervising work with the Kaiten human-guided torpedoes. At the very end of World War II, he was appointed Commander in Chief of the IJN 7th Fleet.

Ōmori died on 24 December 1974.
