= Japanese submarine chaser Cha-245 =

History

Imperial Japanese Navy
- Name: Cha-245
- Builder: Goriki Shipyard Co., Ltd, Ujiyamada
- Laid down: 23 June 1944
- Launched: 10 September 1944
- Completed: 5 November 1944
- Commissioned: 5 November 1944
- Home port: Sasebo
- Fate: transferred to Japan Maritime Safety Agency, 28 August 1947

History

Japan Maritime Safety Agency
- Acquired: 28 August 1947
- Renamed: Manazuru (PS-03)
- Fate: transferred to Japan Maritime Self-Defense Force, 1 May 1954
- Notes: Call sign: JRUX

History

Japan Maritime Self-Defense Force
- Acquired: 1 May 1954
- Decommissioned: 20 February 1962
- Renamed: Manazuru (PS-03)
- Fate: unknown

General characteristics
- Class & type: No.1-class Submarine chaser
- Displacement: 130 long tons (132 t) standard
- Length: 29.20 m (95 ft 10 in) overall
- Beam: 5.65 m (18 ft 6 in)
- Draught: 1.97 m (6 ft 6 in)
- Propulsion: 1 × intermediate diesel; shingle shaft, 400 bhp
- Speed: 11.0 knots (12.7 mph; 20.4 km/h)
- Range: 1,000 nmi (1,900 km) at 10.0 kn (11.5 mph; 18.5 km/h)
- Complement: 32
- Armament: 1 × 13.2mm machine gun; 22 × depth charges; 1 × dunking hydrophone; 1 × simple sonar

Cha-245 or No. 245 (Japanese: 第二百四十五號驅潜特務艇) was a No.1-class auxiliary submarine chaser of the Imperial Japanese Navy that served during World War II.

== History ==
She was laid down on 23 June 1944 at the Ujiyamada shipyard of Goriki Shipyard Co., Ltd. (強力造船所)(also translated as Kyōryoku Shipyard) and launched on 10 September 1944. She was completed and commissioned on 5 November 1944 at the Kure Naval Arsenal; and assigned to the Sasebo Guard Force. On 15 June 1945, she was assigned to the Shimonoseki Guard Force, 7th Fleet. She survived the war. On 20 December 1945, she was demobilized.

On 28 August 1947, she was assigned to the Japan Maritime Safety Agency and on 20 August 1948 she was designated a patrol boast (PS-03) and renamed Manazuru (まなづる). On 1 May 1954, she was transferred to the newly created Japan Maritime Self-Defense Force and designated PS-123. She was delisted on 20 February 1962.
