= Japanese submarine chaser Cha-3 =

History

Imperial Japanese Navy
- Name: Cha-3
- Builder: Yamanishi Shipbuilding & Iron Works Co., Ltd.
- Laid down: 22 January 1942
- Launched: 27 October 1942
- Completed: 2 March 1943
- Stricken: 3 May 1947
- Home port: Yokosuka

General characteristics
- Class & type: No.1-class Submarine chaser
- Displacement: 130 long tons (132 t) standard
- Length: 29.20 m (95 ft 10 in) overall
- Beam: 5.65 m (18 ft 6 in)
- Draught: 1.97 m (6 ft 6 in)
- Propulsion: 1 × intermediate diesel; shingle shaft, 400 bhp
- Speed: 11.0 knots (12.7 mph; 20.4 km/h)
- Range: 1,000 nmi (1,900 km) at 10.0 kn (11.5 mph; 18.5 km/h)
- Complement: 32
- Armament: 1 × 7.7 mm machine gun; 22 × depth charges; 1 × dunking hydrophone; 1 × simple sonar; From mid 1943, the 7.7 mm machine gun was replaced with a 13.2mm machine gun

Cha-3 or No. 3 (Japanese: 第二號驅潜特務艇) was a No.1-class auxiliary submarine chaser of the Imperial Japanese Navy that served during World War II.

== History ==
She was laid down on 22 January 1942 by Yamanishi Shipbuilding & Iron Works Co., Ltd. and launched on 27 October 1942. She was completed on 2 March 1943, fitted with armaments at the Maizuru Naval Arsenal, and assigned to the Kii Defense Force, Osaka Guard District, where she served as an escort and sub chaser in the waters near Japan. On 15 August 1943, she was reassigned to the Southeast Area Fleet. She survived the war and was seized by allied forces at Rabaul. She was removed from the Navy List on 3 May 1947.
