= Japanese submarine chaser Cha-221 =

History

Imperial Japanese Navy
- Name: Cha-221
- Builder: Shikoku Dock Industry Co., Ltd. Takamatsu
- Laid down: 18 January 1944
- Launched: 3 July 1944
- Completed: 28 August 1944
- Commissioned: 28 August 1944
- Decommissioned: 1 December 1945
- Home port: Osaka
- Fate: released to the Ministry of Transportation, 1 January 1948

History

Japan Maritime Safety Agency
- Name: Minesweeper No. 221
- Acquired: 1 May 1948
- Renamed: Yoshikiri (MS-02), 1 December 1951
- Home port: Osaka
- Fate: transferred to Japan Maritime Self-Defense Force, 1 July 1954

History

Japan Maritime Self-Defense Force
- Acquired: 1 July 1954
- Decommissioned: 31 March 1962
- Renamed: Yoshikiri (MSI-690)
- Fate: unknown

General characteristics
- Class & type: No.1-class Submarine chaser
- Displacement: 130 long tons (132 t) standard
- Length: 29.20 m (95 ft 10 in) overall
- Beam: 5.65 m (18 ft 6 in)
- Draught: 1.97 m (6 ft 6 in)
- Propulsion: 1 × intermediate diesel; shingle shaft, 400 bhp
- Speed: 11.0 knots (12.7 mph; 20.4 km/h)
- Range: 1,000 nmi (1,900 km) at 10.0 kn (11.5 mph; 18.5 km/h)
- Complement: 32
- Armament: 1 × 13.2mm machine gun; 22 × depth charges; 1 × dunking hydrophone; 1 × simple sonar

Cha-221 or No. 221 (Japanese: 第二百二十一號驅潜特務艇) was a No.1-class auxiliary submarine chaser of the Imperial Japanese Navy that served during World War II.

== History ==
She was laid down on 18 January 1944 at the Takamatsu shipyard of Shikoku Dock Industry Co., Ltd. (株式會社四国船渠工業所) and launched on 3 July 1944. She was completed and commissioned on 28 August 1944, fitted with armaments at the Kure Naval Arsenal, and assigned to the Kii Defense Unit, Osaka Guard District under commanding officer Teruo Takeuchi. She mostly conducted patrol and escort duties out of the port of Yura, Wakayama. On 6 May 1945, she was attacked and damaged by two Consolidated B-24 Liberators off Komatsushima. She was repaired at Osaka in June 1945. Cha-221 survived the war.

On 1 December 1945, she was demobilized and enrolled as a minesweeper by the occupation forces. On 1 January 1948, she was released to the Ministry of Transportation. On 1 May 1948, she was assigned to the Japan Maritime Safety Agency, a sub-agency of the Ministry of Transportation, and designated Minesweeper No. 221 (MS-02) on 20 August 1948. On 1 December 1951, she was renamed Yoshikiri (MS-02) (よしきり). On 1 July 1954, she was transferred to the newly created Japan Maritime Self-Defense Force and designated as Yoshikiri (MS-02) and later MSI-690. She was delisted on 31 March 1962.
