= Japanese submarine chaser Cha-241 =

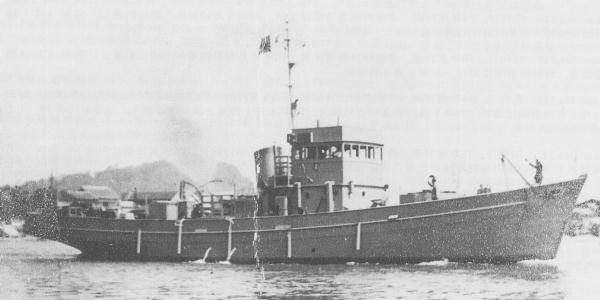
- Vessel of the No.1 class on 10 January 1945

History

Imperial Japanese Navy
- Name: Cha-241
- Builder: Koyanagi Shipyard Co., Ltd., Yokosuka
- Laid down: 1 April 1944
- Launched: 19 September 1944
- Completed: 22 October 1944
- Commissioned: 22 October 1944
- Home port: Osaka
- Fate: transferred to Japan Maritime Safety Agency, 1 January 1947

History

Japan Maritime Safety Agency
- Acquired: 1 January 1947
- Renamed: Furutaka (MS-04)
- Fate: transferred to Japan Maritime Self-Defense Force, 1 April 1956

History

Japan Maritime Self-Defense Force
- Acquired: 1 April 1956
- Decommissioned: 31 March 1962
- Renamed: Furutaka (MS-04)
- Fate: unknown

General characteristics
- Class & type: No.1-class Submarine chaser
- Displacement: 130 long tons (132 t) standard
- Length: 29.20 m (95 ft 10 in) overall
- Beam: 5.65 m (18 ft 6 in)
- Draught: 1.97 m (6 ft 6 in)
- Propulsion: 1 × intermediate diesel; shingle shaft, 400 bhp
- Speed: 11.0 knots (12.7 mph; 20.4 km/h)
- Range: 1,000 nmi (1,900 km) at 10.0 kn (11.5 mph; 18.5 km/h)
- Complement: 32
- Armament: 1 × 13.2mm machine gun; 22 × depth charges; 1 × dunking hydrophone; 1 × simple sonar

Cha-241 or No. 241 (Japanese: 第二百四十一號驅潜特務艇) was a No.1-class auxiliary submarine chaser of the Imperial Japanese Navy that served during World War II.

== History ==
She was laid down on 1 April 1944 at the Yokosuka shipyard of Koyanagi Shipyard Co., Ltd. (株式會社小柳造船所) and launched on 19 September 1944. She was completed and commissioned on 22 October 1944; fitted with armaments at the Yokosuka Naval Arsenal; and assigned to the Kii Defense Force, Osaka Guard District under Ensign Koji Matsumoto. On 29 November 1944, Cha-241 joined the destroyers Hamakaze, Yukikaze, and Isokaze who were escorting the carrier Shinano en route from Yokosuka for Kure when the carrier was torpedoed and sunk by the US submarine Archerfish at 33°07′N 137°04′E. Cha-241 survived the war.

On 1 December 1945, she was demobilized and enrolled as a minesweeper by the occupation forces. On 1 January 1947, she was assigned to the Japan Maritime Safety Agency and on 20 August 1948 she was designated a minesweeper (MS-04). On 1 December 1951, she was renamed Furutaka (ふるたか). On 1 April 1956, she was transferred to the newly created Japan Maritime Self-Defense Force. She was delisted on 31 March 1962.
