= Japanese submarine chaser Cha-196 =

History

Imperial Japanese Navy
- Name: Cha-196
- Builder: Yamanishi Shipbuilding Iron Works, Ishinomaki
- Yard number: 2046
- Laid down: 6 March 1944
- Launched: 8 August 1944
- Completed: 15 October 1944
- Commissioned: 15 October 1944
- Decommissioned: 30 November 1945
- Fate: mobilized by the Allied occupation forces, 1 December 1945

Allied Occupation Force
- Acquired: 1 December 1945
- Decommissioned: 1 August 1947
- Fate: transferred to Ministry of Transportation, 28 August 1947

Ministry of Transportation
- Acquired: 28 August 1947
- Fate: transferred to Japan Maritime Safety Agency, 1 May 1948

Japan Maritime Safety Agency
- Acquired: 1 May 1948
- Renamed: Patrol Vessel Wakataka (PB-25), 23 August 1948; Patrol Vessel Wakataka (PS-25), 25 July 1950; Minesweeper Wakataka (MS-83), 1 December 1951
- Fate: transferred to the Coastal Safety Force, 1 August 1952

Japan Coastal Safety Force
- Acquired: 1 August 1952
- Fate: transferred to Japan Maritime Self-Defense Force, 1 July 1954

Japan Maritime Self-Defense Force
- Acquired: 1 July 1954
- Decommissioned: 31 March 1965
- Renamed: Special Service Boat No. 8 (MS-83), 1 April 1956; Special Service Boat No. 8 (ASM-58), 1 September 1957; Special Service Miscellaneous Ship No. 31 (YAS-31), 31 March 1962
- Fate: unknown

General characteristics
- Class & type: No.1-class submarine chaser
- Displacement: 130 long tons (132 t) standard
- Length: 29.20 m (95 ft 10 in) overall
- Beam: 5.65 m (18 ft 6 in)
- Draught: 1.97 m (6 ft 6 in)
- Propulsion: 1 × intermediate diesel; shingle shaft, 400 bhp (300 kW)
- Speed: 11.0 knots (20.4 km/h; 12.7 mph)
- Range: 1,000 nmi (1,900 km; 1,200 mi) at 10.0 kn (18.5 km/h; 11.5 mph)
- Complement: 32
- Armament: 1 × 13.2 mm machine gun; 22 × depth charges; 1 × dunking hydrophone; 1 × simple sonar

Cha-196 or No. 196 (Japanese: 第百九十六號驅潜特務艇) was a No.1-class auxiliary submarine chaser of the Imperial Japanese Navy that served during World War II and with Japan during the post-war period.

== History ==
Her construction was authorized under the Maru Sen Programme (Ship # 2001–2100). She was laid down on 6 March 1944 as ship 2046 at the Yamanishi Shipbuilding Iron Works (jp:ヤマニシ) in Ishinomaki and launched on 8 August 1944.

She was completed and commissioned on 15 October 1944, fitted with armaments at the Yokosuka Naval Arsenal, and assigned to the Ōminato Guard District under lieutenant Mitsuharu Haneda (海老澤 経男). On 1 November 1944, she was assigned to the Tsugaru Defense Force and tasked with defending the Tsugaru Strait. She spent most of the war conducting anti-submarine and minesweeping patrols from the port of Muroran. On 26 June 1945, she was assigned to the Maizuru Naval District. Cha-196 survived the war and was decommissioned on 30 November 1945.

On 1 December 1945, she was enrolled as a minesweeper by the occupation forces, one of 269 Japanese ships that served as a minesweeper under the Allied forces after the war. She conducted minesweeping operations based out of Ominato and later Shimonoseki. On 1 August 1947, she was demobilized and on 28 August 1947, she was released to the Ministry of Transportation.

On 1 May 1948, she was assigned to the Japan Maritime Safety Agency, a sub-agency of the Ministry of Transportation, and designated on 23 August 1948 as patrol vessel Wakataka (わかたか) (PB-25). On 25 July 1950, she was re-designated as patrol vessel Wakataka (PS-25) and on 1 December 1951 she was redesignated as minesweeper Wakataka (MS-83). On 1 August 1952, she was assigned to the Coastal Safety Force. On 1 July 1954, she was transferred to the newly created Japan Maritime Self-Defense Force and re-designated on 1 April 1956 as special service boat No. 8 (MS-83). On 1 September 1957 she was re-designated as special service boat No. 8 (ASM-58) and on 31 March 1962 as special service miscellaneous ship No. 31 (YAS-31). She was delisted on 31 March 1964.
