= Japanese submarine chaser Cha-28 =

History

Empire of Japan
- Name: Cha-28
- Builder: Saga Shipbuilding Co., Ltd., Shinminato
- Laid down: 5 April 1942
- Launched: 30 March 1943
- Completed: 26 April 1943
- Commissioned: 26 April 1943
- Stricken: 31 March 1944
- Home port: Maizuru
- Fate: Sunk by aircraft, 30 January 1944

General characteristics
- Class & type: No.1-class Submarine chaser
- Displacement: 130 long tons (132 t) standard
- Length: 29.20 m (95 ft 10 in) overall
- Beam: 5.65 m (18 ft 6 in)
- Draught: 1.97 m (6 ft 6 in)
- Propulsion: 1 × intermediate diesel; shingle shaft, 400 bhp
- Speed: 11.0 knots (12.7 mph; 20.4 km/h)
- Range: 1,000 nmi (1,900 km) at 10.0 kn (11.5 mph; 18.5 km/h)
- Complement: 32
- Armament: 1 × 7.7 mm machine gun; 22 × depth charges; 1 × dunking hydrophone; 1 × simple sonar; From mid 1943, the 7.7 mm machine gun was replaced with a 13.2mm machine gun

Cha-28 or No. 28 (Japanese: 第二十八號驅潜特務艇) was a No.1-class auxiliary submarine chaser of the Imperial Japanese Navy that served during World War II.

== History ==
She was laid down on 25 April 1942 at the Shinminato shipyard of the Saga Shipbuilding Co., Ltd. (株式會社佐賀造船鐵工所) and launched on 30 March 1943. She was completed and commissioned on 26 April 1943 and assigned to the Maizuru Town Guard, Maizuru Naval District. On 30 January 1944, Douglas SBD Dauntless dive bombers and Grumman F6F Hellcat fighters from Task Group 52.8 comprising fleet carriers Enterprise, Yorktown, Bunker Hill, and escort carrier Belleau Wood, sink Cha-28, Cha-14, and Cha-19, northeast of Mili Atoll in the Ratak Chain of the Marshall Islands. She was removed from the Navy List on 31 March 1944.
