= Japanese submarine chaser Cha-194 =

History

Imperial Japanese Navy
- Name: Cha-194
- Builder: Miho Shipyard, Shizuoka
- Yard number: 2044
- Laid down: 31 January 1944
- Launched: 29 June 1944
- Completed: 21 August 1944
- Commissioned: 21 August 1944
- Decommissioned: 30 November 1945
- Fate: mobilized by the Allied occupation forces, 1 December 1945

Allied Occupation Force
- Acquired: 1 December 1945
- Decommissioned: 1 August 1947
- Fate: transferred to Ministry of Transportation, 1 January 1948

Ministry of Transportation
- Acquired: 1 January 1948
- Fate: transferred to Japan Maritime Safety Agency, 1 May 1948

Japan Maritime Safety Agency
- Acquired: 1 May 1948
- Renamed: Patrol Vessel Mizutori (PB-42), 1 August 1949; Patrol Vessel Mizutori (PS-42), 1 July 1950
- Stricken: 1 April 1953
- Fate: ran aground and abandoned, August 1952

General characteristics
- Class & type: No.1-class submarine chaser
- Displacement: 130 long tons (132 t) standard
- Length: 29.20 m (95 ft 10 in) overall
- Beam: 5.65 m (18 ft 6 in)
- Draught: 1.97 m (6 ft 6 in)
- Propulsion: 1 × intermediate diesel; shingle shaft, 400 bhp (300 kW)
- Speed: 11.0 knots (20.4 km/h; 12.7 mph)
- Range: 1,000 nmi (1,900 km; 1,200 mi) at 10.0 kn (18.5 km/h; 11.5 mph)
- Complement: 32
- Armament: 1 × 13.2 mm machine gun; 22 × depth charges; 1 × dunking hydrophone; 1 × simple sonar

Cha-194 or No. 194 (Japanese: 第百九十四號驅潜特務艇) was a No.1-class auxiliary submarine chaser of the Imperial Japanese Navy that served during World War II and with Japan during the post-war period.

== History ==
Her construction was authorized under the Maru Sen Programme (Ship # 2001–2100). She was laid down on 31 January 1944 as ship 2044 at the Miho Shipyard in Shimizu City (jp:清水市, now part of Shizuoka City) and launched on 29 June 1944.

She was completed and commissioned on 21 August 1944, fitted with armaments at the Yokosuka Naval Arsenal, and assigned to the Chishima Area Base Force, Northeast Area Fleet under captain Someya Sakuji (染谷 作次) and tasked with patrolling around the Kuril Islands. On 18 June 1945, she was assigned to the Tsugaru Defense Force and tasked with defending the Tsugaru Strait. Cha-194 survived the war and was decommissioned on 30 November 1945.

On 1 December 1945, she was enrolled as a minesweeper by the occupation forces, one of 269 Japanese ships that served as a minesweeper under the Allied forces after the war. She conducted minesweeping operations based out of Ominato and later Shimonoseki. On 1 August 1947, she was demobilized and on 1 January 1948, she was released to the Ministry of Transportation.

On 1 May 1948, she was assigned to the Japan Maritime Safety Agency, a sub-agency of the Ministry of Transportation, and designated on 1 August 1949 as patrol vessel Mizutori (みずとり) (PB-42). On 1 July 1950, she was re-designated as patrol vessel Mizutori (PS-42). In August 1952, she ran aground near Sakata and was abandoned as a total loss. She was delisted on 1 April 1953.
