= Japanese submarine chaser Cha-249 =

History

Imperial Japanese Navy
- Name: Cha-249
- Builder: Fukushima Shipbuilding Co., Ltd., Matsue
- Laid down: 18 May 1944
- Launched: 8 September 1944
- Completed: 14 November 1944
- Commissioned: 14 November 1944
- Home port: Zhenhai
- Fate: transferred to Japan Maritime Safety Agency, 1 January 1948

History

Japan Maritime Safety Agency
- Name: MS-06
- Acquired: 1 January 1948
- Renamed: Kamozuru, 1 December 1951
- Home port: Nagaura
- Fate: transferred to Japan Maritime Self-Defense Force, 1 September 1954
- Notes: Call sign: JNEL

History

Japan Maritime Self-Defense Force
- Name: Kamozuru
- Acquired: 1 September 1954
- Decommissioned: 31 March 1962
- Fate: unknown

General characteristics
- Class & type: No.1-class Submarine chaser
- Displacement: 130 long tons (132 t) standard
- Length: 29.20 m (95 ft 10 in) overall
- Beam: 5.65 m (18 ft 6 in)
- Draught: 1.97 m (6 ft 6 in)
- Propulsion: 1 × intermediate diesel; shingle shaft, 400 bhp
- Speed: 11.0 knots (12.7 mph; 20.4 km/h)
- Range: 1,000 nmi (1,900 km) at 10.0 kn (11.5 mph; 18.5 km/h)
- Complement: 32
- Armament: 1 × 13.2mm machine gun; 22 × depth charges; 1 × dunking hydrophone; 1 × simple sonar

Cha-249 or No. 249 (Japanese: 第二百四十九號驅潜特務艇) was a No.1-class auxiliary submarine chaser of the Imperial Japanese Navy that served during World War II.

== History ==
She was laid down on 18 May 1944 at the Matsue shipyard of Fukushima Shipbuilding Co., Ltd. (有限會社福島造船鐵工所) and launched on 8 September 1944. She was fitted with armaments at the Kure Naval Arsenal; completed and commissioned on 14 November 1944; and assigned to the Zhenhai Guard Force. On 15 June 1945, she was assigned to the Sasebo Guard Force. She survived the war. On 20 December 1945, she was demobilized and assigned to mine-sweeping duties.

On 1 January 1948, she was assigned to the Japan Maritime Safety Agency as a minesweeper and designated MS-06 on 1 May 1948. On 1 December 1951, she was renamed Kamozuru (かもづる) and served during the Korean War. On 1 September 1954, she was transferred to the newly created Japan Maritime Self-Defense Force. She was delisted on 31 March 1962.
