= Japanese submarine chaser Cha-231 =

History

Imperial Japanese Navy
- Name: Cha-231
- Builder: Yamanishi Shipbuilding Co., Ltd., Ishinomaki
- Laid down: 30 August 1944
- Launched: 1944
- Completed: 7 December 1944
- Commissioned: 7 December 1944
- Home port: Sasebo
- Fate: transferred to Japan Maritime Safety Agency, 1 January 1947

History

Japan Maritime Safety Agency
- Acquired: 1 January 1947
- Renamed: Shiratori (MS-17)
- Fate: transferred to Japan Maritime Self-Defense Force, 1 July 1954

History

Japan Maritime Self-Defense Force
- Acquired: 1 July 1954
- Decommissioned: 31 March 1962
- Renamed: Shiratori (MS-17)
- Fate: unknown

General characteristics
- Class & type: No.1-class Submarine chaser
- Displacement: 130 long tons (132 t) standard
- Length: 29.20 m (95 ft 10 in) overall
- Beam: 5.65 m (18 ft 6 in)
- Draught: 1.97 m (6 ft 6 in)
- Propulsion: 1 × intermediate diesel; shingle shaft, 400 bhp
- Speed: 11.0 knots (12.7 mph; 20.4 km/h)
- Range: 1,000 nmi (1,900 km) at 10.0 kn (11.5 mph; 18.5 km/h)
- Complement: 32
- Armament: 1 × 13.2mm machine gun; 22 × depth charges; 1 × dunking hydrophone; 1 × simple sonar

Cha-231 or No. 231 (Japanese: 第二百三十一號驅潜特務艇) was a No.1-class auxiliary submarine chaser of the Imperial Japanese Navy that served during World War II.

== History ==
She was laid down on 30 August 1944 at the Ishinomaki shipyard of Yamanishi Shipbuilding Co., Ltd. (株式會社山西造船鐵工所) and launched later in the same year. She was fitted with armaments at the Yokosuka Naval Arsenal; completed and commissioned on 7 December 1944; and assigned to the Sasebo Defense Force, Sasebo Naval District. Cha-231 survived the war.

On 1 December 1945, she was demobilized and enrolled as a minesweeper by the occupation forces. On 1 January 1947, she was assigned to the Japan Maritime Safety Agency and on 20 August 1948 she was designated minesweeper MS-17. On 1 December 1951, she was renamed Shiratori (しらとり). On 1 July 1954, she was transferred to the newly created Japan Maritime Self-Defense Force. She was delisted on 31 March 1962.
