= Joseph F. Enright =

United States Navy officer

Joseph Francis Enright
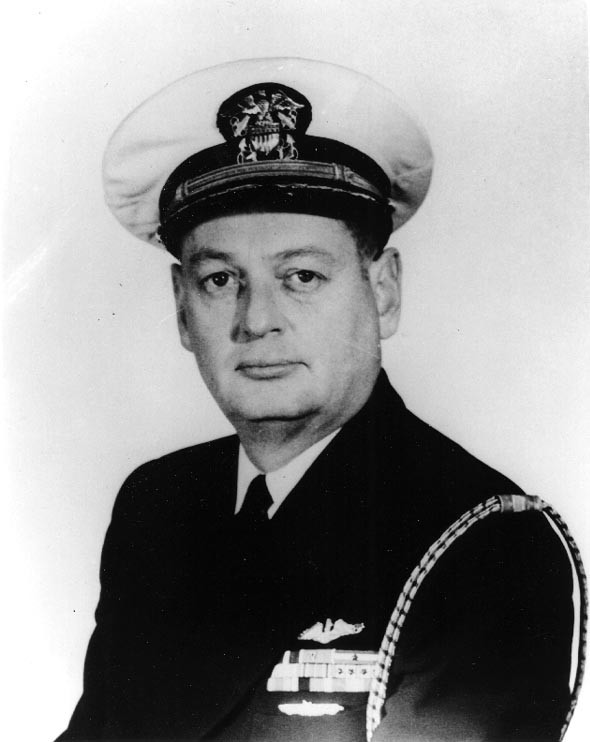
- Joseph Enright in 1957
- Born: September 18, 1910; Minot, North Dakota, US
- Died: July 20, 2000 (aged 89); Fairfax, Virginia, US
- Burial place: Arlington National Cemetery
- Military career
- Allegiance: United States of America
- Branch: United States Navy
- Service years: 1933–1963
- Rank: Captain (United States O-6)
- Commands: USS O-10 (SS-71); USS Dace (SS-247); USS Archerfish (SS-311)
- Conflicts: World War II
- Awards: Navy Cross; Legion of Merit with "V" Device

Joseph Francis Enright (September 18, 1910 – July 20, 2000) was a submarine captain in the United States Navy. He is best known as the man who sank the Japanese aircraft carrier Shinano–the "most significant single submarine sinking of World War II."

== US Navy career ==
Enright was born in Minot, North Dakota. He graduated from United States Naval Academy in 1933, served three years on USS Maryland (BB-46) and achieved submariner's qualification in 1936. During World War II, Lieutenant Commander Enright commanded USS O-10 (SS-71), USS Dace (SS-247) and USS Archerfish (SS-311).

Enright assumed command of the newly built USS Dace on July 23, 1943, and in October sailed out on her first war patrol into busy Japanese waters. On November 15 an Ultra message alerted him to intercept aircraft carrier Shōkaku; Enright located the target and "made a timid approach, abandoning the effort as daylight approached". He then found another target, a tanker, but was depth charged by escort ships and withdrew from active pursuit. In the end the 49-day patrol brought no results. Enright took the blame for failure: "I was responsible for an unproductive patrol and request to be relieved by an officer who can perform more satisfactorily". Admiral Lockwood granted the request and demoted Enright to administrative duties ashore. After half a year at Midway submarine base, Enright requested to be given another submarine command and received "a rare second chance", command of USS Archerfish (SS-311) in September 1944.

Archerfish left Pearl Harbor on October 30, 1944, and reached Saipan on November 9. For the next two weeks the submarine provided search and rescue support to American aviators in the areas of planned air strikes. On November 28, no air raids were scheduled, giving Enright free rein to prowl along Tokyo Bay. While the submarine was patrolling south from Nagoya, radar identified a surface contact 12 miles (19 km) away. Visual contact became possible at 2140, and by 2300 Enright identified it as an aircraft carrier protected by three destroyers.

Enright had initially assumed the target was a tanker. Once he realized it was a carrier, he ordered it tracked "from ahead" in hopes of getting into position for an attack from below.

At 0241, on November 29, the target turned away from Archerfish and then straight at her. At 0305, Enright ordered Archerfish to dive. At 0317 at a mere 1,400 yards (1,300 m) from the target, Enright fired all six forward torpedo tubes at the carrier, scoring four hits. He deliberately set the torpedoes to run shallow (10 feet [3.0 m]); he not only wanted to ensure a hit in case they ran deeper than set, but also hoped to increase the likelihood of capsizing the carrier by holing it further up on its hull. Enright stayed at periscope depth to see the first two torpedoes hit Shinano, then dived down to 400 feet (120 m) in order to escape depth charge revenge from her escorts. While rigged for silent running, Enright and his crew heard loud breaking-up noises for 47 minutes, and were certain they had sent their quarry to the bottom. It was only after the war that the carrier was identified as Shinano, the long-rumored third battleship of the Yamato class. Her keel had been converted into an aircraft carrier while still under construction. The crew struggled with damage for more than seven hours, however the ship capsized at 10:57. With a full-load displacement of 72,000 tons, Shinano is the largest warship in history to be sunk by a submarine. The action earned Enright his Navy Cross.

While researching Shinano!, an account of the sinking, Enright discovered that the carrier was hindered by severe design flaws and strategic errors. According to a post-mortem by the U.S. Naval Technical Mission to Japan, Enright's torpedoes slammed into a poorly-designed joint between the waterline armor belt on the upper hull and the anti-torpedo bulge. Shinano was also compromised by inadequate watertight integrity. A number of watertight doors had not been installed, and the compartments had not been air tested. The carrier's executive officer recalled hearing air rushing through gaps in the doors mere minutes after the last torpedo hit. He knew this meant seawater was already surging into Shinano, proving the doors were unseaworthy. Enright also discovered that task group commander Toshio Abe had operated under the assumption that Archerfish was part of a wolfpack rather than a lone sub. In hopes of outrunning Archerfish, Abe inadvertently turned into the sub's path on a number of occasions. Most seriously, just before Enright opened fire, Abe inadvertently exposed Shinano's entire side to Archerfish, an ideal firing situation for a submarine. As it turned out, this magnified the damage when Enright loosed his torpedoes.

On September 2, 1945, Enright and his crew, along with eleven other submarines, were honored with the task of accompanying USS Missouri (BB-63) during the signing of the Japanese Instrument of Surrender.

After the end of the war, Enright commanded Submarine Division 31 (1949–1950), USS Fulton (AS-11) (1953–1954), Submarine Squadron 8 (1954–1955), was chief of staff for the submarine force of the United States Atlantic Fleet (1955–1957) and commander of USS Boston (CA-69) (1959–1963).

== Retirement years ==
After retirement in 1963 Enright worked at Northrop on the OMEGA Navigation System.

He died in Fairfax, Virginia, and is buried at Arlington National Cemetery.

== Awards and decorations ==

Submarine Warfare insignia
Navy Cross	Legion of Merit w/ "V" Device	Navy Presidential Unit Citation w/ 3/16" bronze star
American Defense Service Medal w/ Fleet Clasp (3/16" bronze star)	American Campaign Medal	Asiatic-Pacific Campaign Medal w/ four 3/16" bronze stars
World War II Victory Medal	Navy Occupation Service Medal w/ 'Japan' clasp	National Defense Service Medal w/ 3/16" bronze star

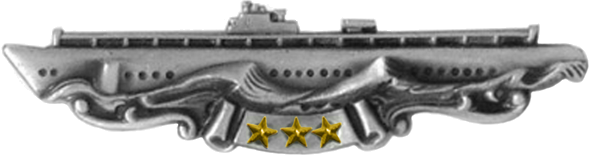

Submarine Combat Patrol Insignia

=== Navy Cross citation ===

Commander Joseph Francis Enright
U.S. Navy
Date Of Action: 30 October 1944 to 15 December 1944

The President of the United States of America takes pleasure in presenting the Navy Cross to Commander Joseph Francis Enright, United States Navy, for extraordinary heroism and distinguished service in the line of his profession as Commanding Officer of the USS Archerfish (SS-311), during the Fifth War Patrol of that vessel in enemy Japanese-controlled waters in the Pacific War Area, from 30 October to 15 December 1944. Quick to act when his ship contacted a high-speed Japanese Task Force on 28 November Commander Enright commenced an all-out pursuit, maneuvering his vessel at top speed to outdistance the zigzagging enemy aircraft carrier. After six hours of determined chase, he succeeded in bringing the submarine to a favorable attack position ahead and, submerging to attack, expertly directed his ship in penetrating the escort screen. Still undetected by the enemy, he launched a full torpedo salvo against the carrier to strike the target with four torpedoes and inflict severe damage which later sank the carrier. Although counterattacked by his victim's escorts, he skillfully evaded all hostile countermeasures and brought the Archer Fish safe to port. By his courage and determination in the face of overwhelming odds, Commander Enright contributed materially to the success of his vessel in sinking the 72,000-ton Japanese carrier. His leadership and zealous devotion to duty throughout were in keeping with the highest traditions of the United States Naval Service.
