= No.1-class submarine chaser (1943) =

Imperial Japanese Navy ship class

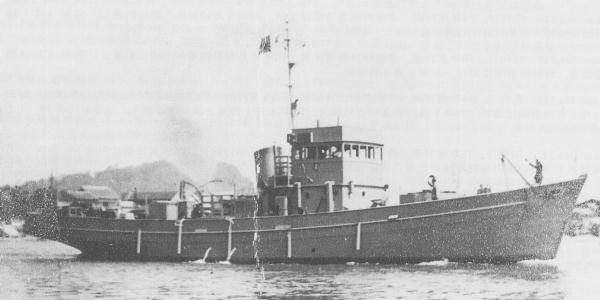
- No.1 class on 10 January 1945

Class overview
- Name: No.1 class
- Builders: Hull; Ichikawa Shipyard; Gōriki Shipyard; Koyanagi Shipyard; Saga Iron Works; Shikoku Dock Company; Jinen Iron Works; Tokushima Limited Sipyard; Nishii Shipyard; Hayashikane Heavy Industries; Fukuoka Iron Works; Fukushima Iron Works; Funaya Iron Works; Miho Shipyard; Murakami Shipyard; Yamanishi Iron Works; Yonago Shipyard; Fitted with armaments; Kure Naval Arsenal; Maizuru Naval Arsenal; Sasebo Naval Arsenal; Yokosuka Naval Arsenal
- Operators: Imperial Japanese Navy; Allied Occupation Force; Japan Maritime Safety Agency; Japan Coastal Safety Force; Japan Maritime Self-Defense Force; Government of Japan; Republic of China Navy; People's Liberation Army Navy
- Built: 1942–1945
- In commission: 1943–1971
- Planned: 200
- Completed: 200
- Lost: 81
- Retired: 119

General characteristics
- Type: Submarine chaser
- Displacement: 130 long tons (132 t) standard
- Length: 29.20 m (95 ft 10 in) overall
- Beam: 5.65 m (18 ft 6 in)
- Draught: 1.97 m (6 ft 6 in)
- Propulsion: 1 × intermediate diesel; shingle shaft, 400 bhp (300 kW)
- Speed: 11.0 knots (20.4 km/h; 12.7 mph)
- Range: 1,000 nmi (1,900 km; 1,200 mi) at 10.0 kn (18.5 km/h; 11.5 mph)
- Complement: 32
- Armament: 1 × 7.7 mm machine gun; 22 × depth charges; 1 × dunking hydrophone; 1 × simple sonar; From mid 1943, the 7.7 mm machine gun was replaced with a 13.2mm machine gun; From mid 1944, the 13.2 mm (0.52 in) machine gun was replaced with a Type 96 25 mm (0.98 in) cannon

The No.1-class submarine chaser (第一号型駆潜特務艇,, Dai Ichi Gō-gata Kusen-Tokumutei) was a class of auxiliary submarine chasers of the Imperial Japanese Navy (IJN), serving during World War II. 200 vessels were built under the Maru Kyū Programme (Ship # 500–599) and the Maru Sen Programme (Ship # 2001–2100).

== Background ==
In 1939 the Imperial Japanese Navy had two diesel-engined harbour tugs built, No.1182 and No.1183. (Other contemporary Japanese harbour tugs were powered by compound steam engines). They had wooden hulls and were designed so that they could be converted to fishing boats after hostilities ended. The two tugs, which were completed in 1940, formed the basis for a class of auxiliary subchasers.

The IJN evaluated them, confirmed that they were effective subchasers, and in 1941, ordered 100 vessels. Their wartime performance was good, but they were always troubled by insect damage because their hull was wooden. Those that survived the war played an active part in the sweeping of magnetic mines in company with the No.1-class auxiliary patrol boats.

== Ships in class ==
Maru Kyū Programme vessels. (Ship # 500–599):

- Aux. Submarine Chaser No.1, completed on 27 March 1943, survived war. Transferred to Japan Maritime Safety Agency as patrol boat and renamed Chidori (PS-18) on 1 May 1948. Later renumbered PS-134. Discarded 1960.
- Aux. Submarine Chaser No.2, completed on 15 March 1943, sunk by HMS Tally-Ho on 6 October 1944.
- Aux. Submarine Chaser No.3, completed on 4 April 1943, survived war.
- Aux. Submarine Chaser No.4, completed on 18 April 1943, survived war. Transferred to Japan Maritime Safety Agency and renamed Kiji (PB-20) on 1 May 1948. Renumbered NS 81 in 1953. Discarded 1959.
- Aux. Submarine Chaser No.5, completed on 26 February 1943, sunk by USS Nicholas, USS Chevalier, USS O'Bannon, and USS Taylor on 18 August 1943 in Battle off Horaniu.
- Aux. Submarine Chaser No.6, completed on 12 March 1943, sunk by USN submarine on 7 July 1944.
- Aux. Submarine Chaser No.7, completed on 12 March 1943, survived war.
- Aux. Submarine Chaser No.8, completed on 17 April 1943, struck a naval mine and sunk on 9 September 1944.
- Aux. Submarine Chaser No.9, completed on 10 May 1943, struck a naval mine and sunk on 9 September 1944.
- Aux. Submarine Chaser No.10, completed on 9 April 1943, sunk in action on 18 March 1944.
- Aux. Submarine Chaser No.11, completed on 12 March 1943, survived war. Sold to steamship company on 27 April 1948.
- Aux. Submarine Chaser No.12, completed on 6 April 1943, sunk by USS Nicholas, USS Chevalier, USS O'Bannon, and USS Taylor on 18 August 1943 in Battle off Horaniu.
- Aux. Submarine Chaser No.13, completed on 12 March 1943, heavily damaged in action on 1 November 1943, later scuttled.
- Aux. Submarine Chaser No.14, completed on 8 May 1943, sunk in action on 30 January 1944.
- Aux. Submarine Chaser No.15, completed on 6 March 1943, sunk in action on 22 October 1944.
- Aux. Submarine Chaser No.16, completed on 10 May 1943, sunk in action on 16 February 1944.
- Aux. Submarine Chaser No.17, completed on 10 May 1943, sunk in action on 18 February 1944.
- Aux. Submarine Chaser No.18, completed on 30 April 1943, sunk in action on 30 January 1944.
- Aux. Submarine Chaser No.19, completed on 24 April 1943, sunk in action on 30 January 1944.
- Aux. Submarine Chaser No.20, completed on 15 April 1943, survived war.
- Aux. Submarine Chaser No.21, completed on 5 May 1943, sunk in action on 30 January 1944.
- Aux. Submarine Chaser No.22, completed on 20 June 1943, sunk in action on 30 March 1944.
- Aux. Submarine Chaser No.23, completed on 5 June 1943, sunk in action on 9 July 1944.
- Aux. Submarine Chaser No.24, completed on 8 July 1943, survived war.
- Aux. Submarine Chaser No.25, completed on 14 May 1943, sunk in action on 31 January 1944.
- Aux. Submarine Chaser No.26, completed on 1 June 1943, sunk in action on 30 March 1944.
- Aux. Submarine Chaser No.27, completed on 10 July 1943, survived war. Transferred to Japan Maritime Safety Agency and renamed Tsubame (PS-23) on 1 May 1948. Discarded 1952.
- Aux. Submarine Chaser No.28, completed on 26 May 1943, sunk in action on 30 January 1944 by planes from Task Group 52.8 comprising fleet carriers Enterprise, Yorktown, and Bunker Hill and escort carrier Belleau Wood.
- Aux. Submarine Chaser No.29, completed on 5 August 1943, sunk in action on 22 February 1944.
- Aux. Submarine Chaser No.30, completed on 10 July 1943, sunk in action on 4 November 1943.
- Aux. Submarine Chaser No.31, completed on 10 June 1943, sunk in action on 16 October 1943.
- Aux. Submarine Chaser No.32, completed on 15 June 1943, sunk in action on 24 September 1944.
- Aux. Submarine Chaser No.33, completed on 21 May 1943, sunk in action on 31 January 1944.
- Aux. Submarine Chaser No.34, completed on 14 August 1943, sunk in action on 19 February 1944.
- Aux. Submarine Chaser No.35, completed on 17 August 1943, survived war.
- Aux. Submarine Chaser No.36, completed on 5 August 1943, survived war.
- Aux. Submarine Chaser No.37, completed on 5 August 1943, sunk by USS Lizardfish on 5 July 1945.
- Aux. Submarine Chaser No.38, completed on 28 June 1943, sunk in action on 30 April 1944.
- Aux. Submarine Chaser No.39, completed on 24 July 1943, sunk in action on 21 September 1944.
- Aux. Submarine Chaser No.40, completed on 20 August 1943, sunk in action on 22 January 1944.
- Aux. Submarine Chaser No.41, completed on 15 July 1943, survived war.
- Aux. Submarine Chaser No.42, completed on 27 August, sunk by USS Hardhead on 23 June 1945.
- Aux. Submarine Chaser No.43, completed on 24 August 1943, converted tugboat and renamed No.1648 on 15 February 1944, survived war.
- Aux. Submarine Chaser No.44, completed on 15 September 1943, converted tugboat and renamed No.1649 on 15 February 1944, survived war.
- Aux. Submarine Chaser No.45, completed on 15 July 1943, survived war.
- Aux. Submarine Chaser No.46, completed on 20 July 1943, sunk in action on 4 April 1944.
- Aux. Submarine Chaser No.47, completed on 22 September 1943, sunk in action on 20 March 1944.
- Aux. Submarine Chaser No.48, completed on 30 September 1943, sunk in action on 21 February 1944.
- Aux. Submarine Chaser No.49, completed on 20 October 1943, survived war.
- Aux. Submarine Chaser No.50, completed on 9 August 1943, sunk by USS Bluefish on 9 July 1945.
- Aux. Submarine Chaser No.51, completed on 4 August 1943, sunk in action on 13 June 1944.
- Aux. Submarine Chaser No.52, completed on 19 October 1943, sunk in action on 25 October 1944.
- Aux. Submarine Chaser No.53, completed on 5 October 1943, sunk in action on 30 March 1944.
- Aux. Submarine Chaser No.54, completed on 5 October 1943, sunk in action on 17 June 1944.
- Aux. Submarine Chaser No.55, completed on 15 November 1943, survived war.
- Aux. Submarine Chaser No.56, completed on 15 October 1943, sunk in action on 17 June 1944.
- Aux. Submarine Chaser No.57, completed on 30 October 1943, survived war. Transferred to Japan Maritime Safety Agency as patrol boat and renamed Kawasemi (PS-21) on 1 May 1948. Later renumbered PS 136. Discarded 1957.
- Aux. Submarine Chaser No.58, completed on 16 November 1943, survived war. Transferred to Japan Maritime Safety Agency as patrol boat and renamed Uzura (PS-32) on 1 May 1948. Renumbered PS 140 later and discarded 1960.
- Aux. Submarine Chaser No.59, completed on 28 August 1943, sunk in action in June 1945.
- Aux. Submarine Chaser No.60, completed on 18 October 1943, survived war.
- Aux. Submarine Chaser No.61, completed on 11 September 1943, survived war.
- Aux. Submarine Chaser No.62, completed on 27 August 1943, sunk in action on 20 March 1944.
- Aux. Submarine Chaser No.63, completed on 25 December 1943, lost in an accident on 10 June 1945.
- Aux. Submarine Chaser No.64, completed on 20 November 1943, sunk in action on 6 January 1945.
- Aux. Submarine Chaser No.65, completed on 4 December 1943, survived war. Sold to Aomori Prefecture on 21 April 1948.
- Aux. Submarine Chaser No.66, completed on 24 October 1943, sunk in action on 7 August 1945.
- Aux. Submarine Chaser No.67, completed on 27 December 1943, survived war.
- Aux. Submarine Chaser No.68, completed on 9 December 1943, survived war.
- Aux. Submarine Chaser No.69, completed on 30 December 1943, survived war.
- Aux. Submarine Chaser No.70, completed on 30 September 1943, survived war.
- Aux. Submarine Chaser No.71, completed on 30 October 1943, survived war. Transferred to Japan Maritime Safety Agency as patrol boat and renamed Hōjiro (PS-39) on 1 May 1948. Discarded 1964.
- Aux. Submarine Chaser No.72, completed on 20 December 1943, survived war. Transferred to Japan Maritime Safety Agency as minesweeper and renamed Umitsubame (MS 07) on 1 May 1948. To Maritime Self Defense Force 1954. Renumbered MSI 697. Transferred to harbour service 1961.
- Aux. Submarine Chaser No.73, completed on 22 December 1943, sunk by USS Bearss on 26 June 1945.
- Aux. Submarine Chaser No.74, completed on 17 November 1943, survived war.
- Aux. Submarine Chaser No.75, completed on 8 February 1944, survived war.
- Aux. Submarine Chaser No.76, completed on 1 January 1944, sunk in action on 11 December 1944.
- Aux. Submarine Chaser No.77, completed on 20 December 1943, sunk in action on 28 August 1944.
- Aux. Submarine Chaser No.78, completed on 15 October 1943, survived war. Transferred to Japan Maritime Safety Agency and renamed Ōtori (PS-28) on 1 May 1948. Redesignated MS 82 1953. Transferred to Maritime Self Defense Force 1954. Discarded 1959
- Aux. Submarine Chaser No.79, completed on 26 February 1944, survived war. Transferred to Japan Maritime Safety Agency and renamed MS 08 on 1 May 1948.
- Aux. Submarine Chaser No.80, completed on 15 December 1943, survived war. Transferred to Japan Maritime Safety Agency and renamed Sekirei (PB-08) on 1 May 1948.
- Aux. Submarine Chaser No.81, completed on 11 January 1944, survived war.
- Aux. Submarine Chaser No.82, completed on 22 December 1943, sunk in action on 22 October 1944.
- Aux. Submarine Chaser No.83, completed on 22 December 1943, survived war.
- Aux. Submarine Chaser No.84, completed on 19 January 1944, sunk in action on 12 November 1944.
- Aux. Submarine Chaser No.85, completed on 23 March 1944, sunk in action on 8 July 1945.
- Aux. Submarine Chaser No.86, completed on 20 December 1943, survived war. Transferred to Japan Maritime Safety Agency and renamed MS 09 on 1 May 1948.
- Aux. Submarine Chaser No.87, completed on 13 February 1944, sunk in action on 12 October 1944.
- Aux. Submarine Chaser No.88, completed on 25 February 1944, survived war. Transferred to Japan Maritime Safety Agency and renamed MS 10 on 1 May 1948.
- Aux. Submarine Chaser No.89, completed on 5 November 1943, survived war. Sold to Ministry of Education on 29 May 1948.
- Aux. Submarine Chaser No.90, completed on 12 February 1944, survived war. Transferred to Japan Maritime Safety Agency and renamed MS 11 on 1 May 1948.
- Aux. Submarine Chaser No.91, completed on 13 March 1944, sunk in action on 25 January 1945.
- Aux. Submarine Chaser No.92, completed on 27 January 1944, lost in an accident on 4 October 1944.
- Aux. Submarine Chaser No.93, completed on 1 March 1944, survived war. Transferred to Japan Maritime Safety Agency and renamed MS 12 on 1 May 1948.
- Aux. Submarine Chaser No.94, completed on 9 March 1944, sunk by rough weather on 23 September 1944.
- Aux. Submarine Chaser No.95, completed on 29 March 1944, sunk in action on 18 October 1944.
- Aux. Submarine Chaser No.96, completed on 10 March 1944, survived war.
- Aux. Submarine Chaser No.97, completed on 10 February 1944, sunk by USS Sennet on 19 April 1945.
- Aux. Submarine Chaser No.98, completed on 20 February 1944, sunk in action on 24 July 1945.
- Aux. Submarine Chaser No.99, completed on 11 March 1944, survived war. Transferred to Japan Maritime Safety Agency and renamed MS 13 on 1 May 1948.
- Aux. Submarine Chaser No.100, completed on 10 February 1944, survived war.

Maru Sen Programme vessels. (Ship # 2001–2100)

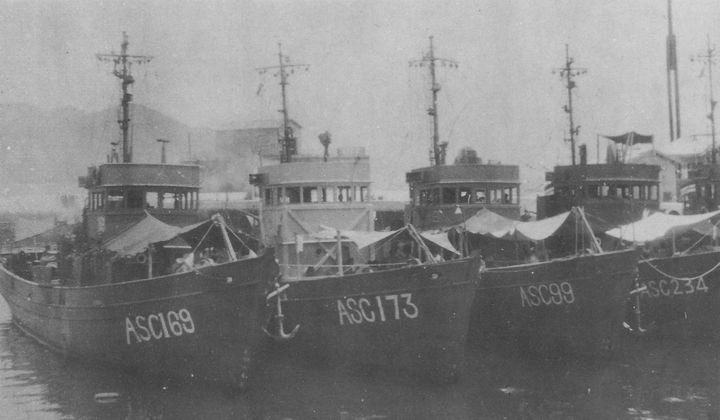
No.169, No.173, No.99 and No.234 in 1946

- Aux. Submarine Chaser No.151, completed on 14 March 1944, aground by rough weather on 15 April 1945, later scuttled.
- Aux. Submarine Chaser No.152, completed on 10 February 1944, missing in action in end of 1944.
- Aux. Submarine Chaser No.153, completed on 19 April 1944, struck a naval mine and sunk in shallow water on 6 July 1945.
- Aux. Submarine Chaser No.154, completed on 24 April 1944, survived war. Transferred to Japan Maritime Safety Agency and renamed Uguisu (PB-06) on 1 May 1948.
- Aux. Submarine Chaser No.155, completed on 25 April 1944, survived war. Transferred to Japan Maritime Safety Agency and renamed Shigi (PB-26) on 1 May 1948.
- Aux. Submarine Chaser No.156, completed on 31 March 1944, sunk in action on 29 March 1945.
- Aux. Submarine Chaser No.157, completed on 20 April 1944, survived war. Transferred to Japan Maritime Safety Agency and renamed Aosagi (PB-37) on 1 August 1948.
- Aux. Submarine Chaser No.158, completed on 24 April 1944, survived war. Sold to Ministry of Education on 25 May 1948.
- Aux. Submarine Chaser No.159, completed on 17 May 1944, survived war. Transferred to Japan Maritime Safety Agency and renamed Hinazuru (PB-38) on 1 August 1948.
- Aux. Submarine Chaser No.160, completed on 3 May 1944, survived war.
- Aux. Submarine Chaser No.161, completed on 3 July 1944, survived war. Transferred to Japan Maritime Safety Agency and renamed Kotaka (PB-24) on 1 May 1948.
- Aux. Submarine Chaser No.162, completed on 26 May 1944, survived war. Sold to fishery company on 5 May 1948.
- Aux. Submarine Chaser No.163, completed on 23 June 1944, heavily damaged in action on 4 January 1945, later scuttled.
- Aux. Submarine Chaser No.164, completed on 22 June 1944, survived war. Sold to steamship company on 5 May 1948.
- Aux. Submarine Chaser No.165, completed on 25 April 1944, survived war.
- Aux. Submarine Chaser No.166, completed on 10 June 1944, survived war. Transferred to Japan Maritime Safety Agency and renamed Hato (PB-17) on 1 May 1948.
- Aux. Submarine Chaser No.167, completed on 13 June 1944, struck a naval mine and sunk on 15 August 1945.
- Aux. Submarine Chaser No.168, completed on 6 July 1944, survived war. Transferred to Japan Maritime Safety Agency and renamed MS 57 on 1 May 1948.
- Aux. Submarine Chaser No.169, completed on 31 May 1944, survived war. Transferred to Japan Maritime Safety Agency and renamed Yamasemi (PB-11) on 1 May 1948.
- Aux. Submarine Chaser No.170, completed on 5 May 1944, survived war. (in apraxia)
- Aux. Submarine Chaser No.171, completed on 11 May 1944, survived war. Transferred to Japan Maritime Safety Agency and renamed MS 01 on 1 May 1948.
- Aux. Submarine Chaser No.172, completed on 15 June 1944, struck a naval mine and sunk on 26 May 1945.
- Aux. Submarine Chaser No.173, completed on 30 May 1944, survived war. Transferred to Japan Maritime Safety Agency and renamed Shirataka (PB-40) on 1 August 1948.
- Aux. Submarine Chaser No.174, completed on 22 June 1944, survived war.
- Aux. Submarine Chaser No.175, completed on 9 August 1944, survived war. Transferred to Japan Maritime Safety Agency and renamed Kasasagi (PB-01) on 1 May 1948.
- Aux. Submarine Chaser No.176, completed on 9 August 1944, sunk in action on 4 January 1945.
- Aux. Submarine Chaser No.177, completed on 18 May 1944, survived war.
- Aux. Submarine Chaser No.178, completed on 7 July 1944, survived war.
- Aux. Submarine Chaser No.179, completed on 30 May 1944, survived war. Transferred to Japan Maritime Safety Agency and renamed Yamagara (PB-41) on 1 August 1948.
- Aux. Submarine Chaser No.180, completed on 17 July 1944, survived war.
- Aux. Submarine Chaser No.181, completed on 15 June 1944, survived war. Transferred to Japan Maritime Safety Agency and renamed Hibari (PB-16) on 1 May 1948.
- Aux. Submarine Chaser No.182, completed on 3 July 1944, survived war. (in apraxia)
- Aux. Submarine Chaser No.183, completed on 3 July 1944, survived war. Transferred to Japan Maritime Safety Agency and renamed Benizuru (PB-12) on 1 May 1948.
- Aux. Submarine Chaser No.184, completed on 14 July 1944, survived war.
- Aux. Submarine Chaser No.185, completed on 3 September 1944, survived war. Transferred to Japan Maritime Safety Agency and renamed Hayabusa (PB-19) on 1 May 1948.
- Aux. Submarine Chaser No.186, completed on 4 September 1944, survived war. Transferred to Japan Maritime Safety Agency and renamed Hatsukari (PB-13) on 1 May 1948.
- Aux. Submarine Chaser No.187, completed on 3 June 1944, survived war. Transferred to Japan Maritime Safety Agency and renamed Yamadori (PB-04) on 1 May 1948.
- Aux. Submarine Chaser No.188, completed on 10 July 1944, struck a naval mine and sunk on 3 July 1945.
- Aux. Submarine Chaser No.189, completed on 31 July 1944, sunk in action on 29 March 1945.
- Aux. Submarine Chaser No.190, completed on 25 July 1944, survived war.
- Aux. Submarine Chaser No.191, completed on 28 July 1944, survived war.
- Aux. Submarine Chaser No.192, completed on 30 June 1944, sunk in action on 29 March 1945.
- Aux. Submarine Chaser No.193, completed on 20 August 1944, survived war.
- Aux. Submarine Chaser No.194, completed on 21 August 1944, survived war. Transferred to Japan Maritime Safety Agency and renamed Mizutori (PB-42) on 1 May 1948.
- Aux. Submarine Chaser No.195, completed on 18 August 1944, struck a naval mine and sunk on 6 June 1945.
- Aux. Submarine Chaser No.196, completed on 15 October 1944, survived war. Transferred to Japan Maritime Safety Agency and renamed Wakataka (PB-25) on 1 May 1948.
- Aux. Submarine Chaser No.197, completed on 14 October 1944, struck a naval mine and sunk on 18 June 1945.
- Aux. Submarine Chaser No.198, completed on 26 June 1944, survived war.
- Aux. Submarine Chaser No.199, completed on 17 August 1944, missing in action in Spring 1945.
- Aux. Submarine Chaser No.200, completed on 25 July 1944, sunk in action on 29 March 1945.
- Aux. Submarine Chaser No.201, completed on 1 September 1944, survived war.
- Aux. Submarine Chaser No.202, completed on 1 September 1944, survived war. Transferred to Japan Maritime Safety Agency and renamed MS 14 on 1 May 1948. Sunk off Wonsan Korea during minesweeping operations on 17 October 1950.
- Aux. Submarine Chaser No.203, completed on 14 October 1944, survived war. Transferred to Japan Maritime Safety Agency and renamed Hiyodori (PB-22) on 1 May 1948.
- Aux. Submarine Chaser No.204, completed on 18 September 1944, survived war.
- Aux. Submarine Chaser No.205, completed on 30 September 1944, sunk in action on 29 March 1945.
- Aux. Submarine Chaser No.206, completed on 25 August 1944, sunk in action on 26 June 1945.
- Aux. Submarine Chaser No.207, completed on 17 August 1944, survived war.
- Aux. Submarine Chaser No.208, completed on 6 October 1944, survived war.
- Aux. Submarine Chaser No.209, completed on 28 July 1944, sunk in action on 26 June 1945.
- Aux. Submarine Chaser No.210, completed on 29 August 1944, sunk in action on 5 May 1945.
- Aux. Submarine Chaser No.211, completed on 20 September 1944, heavily damaged in action and sunk in shallow water on 18 July 1945.
- Aux. Submarine Chaser No.212, completed on 25 October 1944, survived war.
- Aux. Submarine Chaser No.213, completed on 28 November 1944, survived war. (in apraxia) Sold to Kanagawa Prefecture on 16 February 1948.
- No.2064 vessel (Aux. Submarine Chaser No.214), transferred to Karafuto Prefecture, before completed.
- Aux. Submarine Chaser No.214, substitution of the No.2064 vessel, completed on 8 December 1944, survived war. Transferred to Japan Maritime Safety Agency and renamed MS 15 on 1 May 1948.
- Aux. Submarine Chaser No.215, completed on 15 August 1944, survived war. Transferred to Japan Maritime Safety Agency and renamed MS 16 on 1 May 1948.
- Aux. Submarine Chaser No.216, completed on 13 September 1944, sunk in action on 9 January 1945.
- Aux. Submarine Chaser No.217, completed on 6 December 1944, survived war. Transferred to Japan Maritime Safety Agency and renamed Tsugumi (PB-07) on 1 May 1948.
- Aux. Submarine Chaser No.218, completed on 25 November 1944, survived war.
- Aux. Submarine Chaser No.219, completed on 9 November 1944, survived war. Transferred to Japan Maritime Safety Agency and renamed Shirasagi (PB-14) on 1 May 1948.
- Aux. Submarine Chaser No.220, completed on 28 December 1944, survived war. Captured by Republic of China in 1945, betrayed to People's Republic of China in 1949.
- Aux. Submarine Chaser No.221, completed on 28 August 1944, survived war. Transferred to Japan Maritime Safety Agency and renamed MS 02 on 1 May 1948.
- Aux. Submarine Chaser No.222, completed on 1 November 1944, survived war. Transferred to Japan Maritime Safety Agency and renamed MS 03 on 1 May 1948.
- Aux. Submarine Chaser No.223, completed on 25 November 1944, survived war. Captured by Republic of China in 1945, betrayed to People's Republic of China in 1949.
- Aux. Submarine Chaser No.224, completed on 5 October 1944, sunk in action on 5 March 1945.
- Aux. Submarine Chaser No.225, completed on 31 August 1944, sunk in action on 18 July 1945.
- Aux. Submarine Chaser No.226, completed on 14 November 1944, survived war. (in apraxia)
- Aux. Submarine Chaser No.227, completed on 24 October 1944, survived war.
- Aux. Submarine Chaser No.228, completed on 21 September 1944, survived war. Sunk in typhoon on 18 September 1945.
- Aux. Submarine Chaser No.229, completed on 11 January 1945, survived war.
- Aux. Submarine Chaser No.230, completed on 25 October 1944, lost in an accident on 5 June 1945.
- Aux. Submarine Chaser No.231, completed on 7 December 1944, survived war. Transferred to Japan Maritime Safety Agency and renamed MS 17 on 1 May 1948.
- Aux. Submarine Chaser No.232, completed on 31 December 1944, survived war. Transferred to Japan Maritime Safety Agency and renamed Ōtaka (PB-09) on 1 May 1948.
- Aux. Submarine Chaser No.233, completed on 10 November 1944, sunk in action on 31 March 1945.
- Aux. Submarine Chaser No.234, completed on 1 November 1944, survived war.
- Aux. Submarine Chaser No.235, completed on 18 September 1944, survived war.
- Aux. Submarine Chaser No.236, completed on 26 October 1944, survived war.
- Aux. Submarine Chaser No.237, completed on 15 January 1945, sunk in action on 11 June 1945.
- Aux. Submarine Chaser No.238, completed on 25 November 1944, survived war.
- Aux. Submarine Chaser No.239, completed on 12 January 1945, survived war.
- Aux. Submarine Chaser No.240, completed on 9 January 1945, survived war. Captured by Republic of China in 1945.
- Aux. Submarine Chaser No.241, completed on 22 October 1944, survived war. Transferred to Japan Maritime Safety Agency and renamed MS 04 on 1 May 1948.
- Aux. Submarine Chaser No.242, completed on 19 December 1944, survived war.
- Aux. Submarine Chaser No.243, completed on 1 November 1944, survived war.
- Aux. Submarine Chaser No.244, completed on 1 December 1944, sunk in action on 20 May 1945.
- Aux. Submarine Chaser No.245, completed on 5 November 1944, survived war. Transferred to Japan Maritime Safety Agency and renamed Manazuru (PB-03) on 1 May 1948.
- Aux. Submarine Chaser No.246, completed on 22 January 1945, survived war. Transferred to Japan Maritime Safety Agency and renamed MS 05 on 1 May 1948.
- Aux. Submarine Chaser No.247, completed on 11 December 1944, survived war.
- Aux. Submarine Chaser No.248, completed on 11 November 1944, survived war.
- Aux. Submarine Chaser No.249, completed on 14 November 1944, survived war. Transferred to Japan Maritime Safety Agency and renamed MS 06 on 1 May 1948.
- Aux. Submarine Chaser No.250, completed on 6 October 1944, survived war.

== Bibliography ==
- Gardiner, Robert and Stephen Chumbley. Conway's All The World's Fighting Ships 1947–1995. Annapolis, Maryland, USA: Naval Institute Press, 1995. ISBN 1-55750-132-7.
- Jentschura, Hansgeorg, Dieter Jung and Peter Michel. Warships of the Imperial Japanese Navy, 1869–1945, Annapolis, Maryland, USA: Naval Institute Press, 1977. ISBN 0-87021-893-X
- Ships of the World special issue Vol.45, Escort Vessels of the Imperial Japanese Navy, Kaijinsha, (Japan), February 1996
- The Maru Special-Japanese Naval Vessels No.49, Japanese submarine chasers, Ushio Shobō (Japan), March 1981
