= Japanese submarine chaser Cha-13 =

History

Empire of Japan
- Name: Cha-13
- Builder: Fukuoka Shipbuilding Co., Ltd., Fukuoka
- Laid down: 30 January 1942
- Launched: 28 February 1943
- Completed: 12 March 1943
- Commissioned: 12 March 1943
- Stricken: 30 April 1944
- Home port: Sasebo
- Fate: Sunk by aircraft, 30 April 1943

General characteristics
- Class & type: No.1-class Submarine chaser
- Displacement: 130 long tons (132 t) standard
- Length: 29.20 m (95 ft 10 in) overall
- Beam: 5.65 m (18 ft 6 in)
- Draught: 1.97 m (6 ft 6 in)
- Propulsion: 1 × intermediate diesel; shingle shaft, 400 bhp
- Speed: 11.0 knots (12.7 mph; 20.4 km/h)
- Range: 1,000 nmi (1,900 km) at 10.0 kn (11.5 mph; 18.5 km/h)
- Complement: 32
- Armament: 1 × 7.7 mm machine gun; 22 × depth charges; 1 × dunking hydrophone; 1 × simple sonar; From mid 1943, the 7.7 mm machine gun was replaced with a 13.2mm machine gun

Cha-13 or No. 13 (Japanese: 第十三號驅潜特務艇) was a No.1-class auxiliary submarine chaser of the Imperial Japanese Navy that served during World War II.

== History ==
She was laid down on 30 January 1942 at the Fukuoka shipyard of the Fukuoka Shipbuilding Co., Ltd. and launched on 28 February 1943. She was completed on 12 March 1943 and assigned to the Sasebo Defense Force, Sasebo Naval District. On 1 June 1943, she was reassigned to support Army operations in the South Pacific and order to proceed to Rabaul.

On 1 November 1943 she was attacked and sunk by aircraft from Task Force 38 east of Shortland Island at 07°00′S 155°30′E. She was removed from the Navy List on 30 April 1944.
