= Japanese submarine chaser Cha-187 =

Japanese submarine chaser

History

Imperial Japanese Navy
- Name: Cha-187
- Builder: Shikoku Shipyard Industry Co., Ltd, Takamatsu
- Yard number: 2037
- Laid down: 9 November 1943
- Launched: 26 April 1944
- Completed: 3 June 1944
- Commissioned: 3 June 1944
- Decommissioned: 30 November 1945
- Fate: mobilized by the Allied occupation forces, 1 December 1945

Allied Occupation Force
- Acquired: 1 December 1945
- Decommissioned: 1 August 1947
- Fate: transferred to Ministry of Transportation, 28 August 1947

Ministry of Transportation
- Acquired: 28 August 1947
- Fate: transferred to Japan Maritime Safety Agency, 1 May 1948

Japan Maritime Safety Agency
- Acquired: 1 May 1948
- Renamed: Patrol Vessel Yamadori (PB-04), 20 October 1949; Patrol Vessel Yamadori (PS-04), 1 July 1950; Patrol Vessel Yamadori (PS-124), 1 July 1951
- Stricken: 28 February 1955
- Fate: unknown

General characteristics
- Class & type: No.1-class submarine chaser
- Displacement: 130 long tons (132 t) standard
- Length: 29.20 m (95 ft 10 in) overall
- Beam: 5.65 m (18 ft 6 in)
- Draught: 1.97 m (6 ft 6 in)
- Propulsion: 1 × intermediate diesel; shingle shaft, 400 bhp (300 kW)
- Speed: 11.0 knots (20.4 km/h; 12.7 mph)
- Range: 1,000 nmi (1,900 km; 1,200 mi) at 10.0 kn (18.5 km/h; 11.5 mph)
- Complement: 32
- Armament: 1 × 13.2 mm machine gun; 22 × depth charges; 1 × dunking hydrophone; 1 × simple sonar

Cha-187 or No. 187 (Japanese: 第百八十七號驅潜特務艇) was a No.1-class auxiliary submarine chaser of the Imperial Japanese Navy that served during World War II and with Japan during the post-war period.

== History ==
Her construction was authorized under the Maru Sen Programme (Ship # 2001–2100). She was laid down on 31 January 1944 as ship 2037 at the Shikoku Shipyard Industry Co., Ltd shipyard in Takamatsu and launched on 26 April 1944.

She was completed and commissioned on 3 June 1944, fitted with armaments at the Kure Naval Arsenal, and assigned to the Saeki Defense squadron, Kure Defense Force, Kure Naval District under captain Yoshihiko Higashiide (東出 義彦) She conducted escort duty between Oshima and Miike (jp:三池, now part of Ōmuta City); and then proceeded to Yamakawa where she was drydocked on 13 November 1944. In November 1944, ensign Hajime Katada (堅田 肇) was placed in command; and in December 1944, he was replaced by ensign Kanichi Kamihara (神原 勘一). In February 1945, she returned to Kure for further repair and on 10 June 1945, she was assigned to 81st Squadron, Kure Defense Force. Cha-187 survived the war and was decommissioned on 30 November 1945.

On 1 December 1945, she was enrolled as a minesweeper by the occupation forces, one of 269 Japanese ships that served as a minesweeper under the Allied forces after the war. She conducted minesweeping operations based out of Kure and later Otake. On 1 August 1947, she was demobilized and on 28 August 1947, she was released to the Ministry of Transportation.

On 1 May 1948, she was assigned to the Japan Maritime Safety Agency, a sub-agency of the Ministry of Transportation, and designated on 20 October 1949 as patrol vessel Yamadori (やまどり) (PB-04). On 1 July 1950, she was re-designated as patrol vessel Yamadori (PS-04). On 1 July 1951, she was re-designated as patrol vessel Yamadori (PS-124). She was delisted on 28 February 1955.
