= Japanese submarine chaser Cha-232 =

History

Imperial Japanese Navy
- Name: Cha-232
- Builder: Nishii Shipyards, Ujiyamada
- Laid down: 26 August 1944
- Launched: 1944
- Completed: 31 December 1944
- Commissioned: 31 December 1944
- Home port: Sasebo
- Fate: transferred to Japan Maritime Safety Agency, 1 July 1954

History

Japan Maritime Safety Agency
- Acquired: 1 July 1954
- Renamed: Ōtaka (PB-09)
- Fate: transferred to Japan Maritime Self-Defense Force, 1 April 1956

History

Japan Maritime Self-Defense Force
- Acquired: 1 April 1956
- Decommissioned: 31 March 1962
- Renamed: Ōtaka (MS-86)
- Fate: unknown

General characteristics
- Class & type: No.1-class Submarine chaser
- Displacement: 130 long tons (132 t) standard
- Length: 29.20 m (95 ft 10 in) overall
- Beam: 5.65 m (18 ft 6 in)
- Draught: 1.97 m (6 ft 6 in)
- Propulsion: 1 × intermediate diesel; shingle shaft, 400 bhp
- Speed: 11.0 knots (12.7 mph; 20.4 km/h)
- Range: 1,000 nmi (1,900 km) at 10.0 kn (11.5 mph; 18.5 km/h)
- Complement: 32
- Armament: 1 × 13.2mm machine gun; 22 × depth charges; 1 × dunking hydrophone; 1 × simple sonar

Cha-232 or No. 232 (Japanese: 第二百三十二號驅潜特務艇) was a No.1-class auxiliary submarine chaser of the Imperial Japanese Navy that served during World War II.

== History ==
She was laid down on 26 August 1944 at the Ujiyamada shipyard of Nishii Shipyards (西井=西井造船所) and launched in 1944. She was fitted with armaments at the Yokosuka Naval Arsenal, completed and commissioned on 31 December 1944, and assigned to the Sasebo Guard Force. On 15 May 1945, she was assigned to the Shimonoseki Defense Team. Cha-232 survived the war.

On 30 December 1945, she was demobilized and enrolled as a minesweeper by the occupation forces operating out of Shimonoseki. On 28 August 1947, she was assigned to the Japan Maritime Safety Agency and on 20 August 1948 she was designated as a patrol boat (PB-09) and renamed Ōtaka. On 1 July 1950, she was re-designated as PS-09 and on 1 August 1951 as minesweeper MS-86. On 1 July 1954, she was transferred to the newly created Japan Maritime Self-Defense Force. On 1 April 1956, she was re-designated Special Boat No. 10 (MS-86). She was delisted on 31 March 1957.
