= Japanese submarine chaser Cha-219 =

History

Imperial Japanese Navy
- Name: Cha-219
- Builder: Yamanishi Shipbuilding Co., Ltd. Takamatsu
- Laid down: 25 June 1944
- Launched: 1944
- Completed: 9 November 1944
- Commissioned: 9 November 1944
- Decommissioned: 1 December 1945
- Home port: Yokosuka
- Fate: released to the Ministry of Transportation, 8 August 1947

History

Japan Maritime Safety Agency
- Acquired: 1 May 1948
- Renamed: Shirasagi (PB-14), 20 August 1948; Shirasagi (MS-85), 20 August 1951
- Fate: transferred to Japan Maritime Self-Defense Force, 1 July 1954

History

Japan Maritime Self-Defense Force
- Acquired: 1 July 1954
- Decommissioned: 31 March 1962
- Renamed: Shirasagi (MS-85)
- Fate: unknown

General characteristics
- Class & type: No.1-class Submarine chaser
- Displacement: 130 long tons (132 t) standard
- Length: 29.20 m (95 ft 10 in) overall
- Beam: 5.65 m (18 ft 6 in)
- Draught: 1.97 m (6 ft 6 in)
- Propulsion: 1 × intermediate diesel; shingle shaft, 400 bhp
- Speed: 11.0 knots (12.7 mph; 20.4 km/h)
- Range: 1,000 nmi (1,900 km) at 10.0 kn (11.5 mph; 18.5 km/h)
- Complement: 32
- Armament: 1 × 13.2mm machine gun; 22 × depth charges; 1 × dunking hydrophone; 1 × simple sonar

Cha-219 or No. 219 (Japanese: 第二百十九號驅潜特務艇) was a No.1-class auxiliary submarine chaser of the Imperial Japanese Navy that served during World War II.

== History ==
She was laid down on 18 January 1944 at the Takamatsu shipyard of Yamanishi Shipbuilding Co., Ltd. (株式會社山西造船鐵工所) and launched later in the year. She was completed and commissioned on 9 November 1944, fitted with armaments at the Yokosuka Naval Arsenal, and assigned to the Yokosuka Defense Unit, Yokosuka Naval District. She mostly conducted patrol and escort duties out of the port of Uraga, Kanagawa. On 5 June 1945, she was assigned to the Ise Defense Force. Cha-219 survived the war.

On 1 December 1945, she was demobilized and enrolled as a minesweeper by the occupation forces. On 8 August 1947, she was released to the Ministry of Transportation. On 1 May 1948, she was assigned to the Japan Maritime Safety Agency, a sub-agency of the Ministry of Transportation, and designated on 20 August 1948 as patrol boat 14 (PB-14) with the name Shirasagi (しらさぎ). On 20 August 1951, she was re-designated as minesweeper Shirasagi (MS-85). On 1 July 1954, she was transferred to the newly created Japan Maritime Self-Defense Force and designated as Shirasagi (MS-85) and later as special agent boat YAS-08. She was delisted on 31 March 1962.
