= Japanese submarine chaser Cha-42 =

History

Empire of Japan
- Name: Cha-42
- Laid down: 10 July 1942
- Launched: 7 June 1943
- Completed: 27 August 1943
- Commissioned: 27 August 1943
- Stricken: 3 May 1947
- Home port: Sasebo
- Fate: Torpedoed and sunk, 23 June 1945

General characteristics
- Class & type: No.1-class submarine chaser
- Displacement: 130 long tons (132 t) standard
- Length: 29.20 m (95 ft 10 in) overall
- Beam: 5.65 m (18 ft 6 in)
- Draught: 1.97 m (6 ft 6 in)
- Propulsion: 1 × intermediate diesel; shingle shaft, 400 bhp (300 kW)
- Speed: 11.0 knots (20.4 km/h; 12.7 mph)
- Range: 1,000 nmi (1,900 km; 1,200 mi) at 10.0 kn (18.5 km/h; 11.5 mph)
- Complement: 32
- Sensors & processing systems: 1 × dunking hydrophone; 1 × simple sonar
- Armament: 1 × 7.7 mm machine gun; 22 × depth charges; From mid 1943, the 7.7 mm machine gun was replaced with a 13.2 mm machine gun

Cha-42 or No. 42 (Japanese: 第四十二號驅潜特務艇) was a No.1-class submarine chaser of the Imperial Japanese Navy that served during World War II.

== History ==
She was laid down on 10 July 1942 and launched on 7 June 1943. On 27 August 1943, she was completed, commissioned, and assigned to the Sasebo Defense Force, Sasebo Naval District. On 15 October 1943, she was reassigned to the 31st Guard Unit Unit, Manila. On 20 February 1945, she was reassigned to the 21st Special Base Force, Surabaya, Java.

On 23 June 1945, she was attacked and sunk by a torpedo from the American submarine USS Hardhead southeast of the Masalembu Islands at 05°44′S 114°16′E. She was removed from the Navy List on 3 May 1947.
