= Japanese submarine chaser Cha-186 =

Japanese submarine chaser

History

Imperial Japanese Navy
- Name: Cha-186
- Builder: Ichikawa Shipyard, Ujiyamada
- Yard number: 2036
- Laid down: 3 May 1944
- Launched: 6 July 1944
- Completed: 4 September 1944
- Commissioned: 4 September 1944
- Decommissioned: 30 November 1945
- Fate: mobilized by the Allied occupation forces, 1 December 1945

Allied Occupation Force
- Acquired: 1 December 1945
- Decommissioned: 1 August 1947
- Fate: transferred to Ministry of Transportation, 28 August 1947

Ministry of Transportation
- Acquired: 28 August 1947
- Fate: transferred to Japan Maritime Safety Agency, 1 May 1948

Japan Maritime Safety Agency
- Acquired: 1 May 1948
- Renamed: Patrol Vessel Hatsukari (PB-13), 23 August 1948; Patrol Vessel Hatsukari (PS-13), 1 July 1950; Patrol Vessel Hatsukari (PS-131), 1 July 1951
- Stricken: 20 November 1956
- Fate: unknown

General characteristics
- Class & type: No.1-class submarine chaser
- Displacement: 130 long tons (132 t) standard
- Length: 29.20 m (95 ft 10 in) overall
- Beam: 5.65 m (18 ft 6 in)
- Draught: 1.97 m (6 ft 6 in)
- Propulsion: 1 × intermediate diesel; shingle shaft, 400 bhp (300 kW)
- Speed: 11.0 knots (20.4 km/h; 12.7 mph)
- Range: 1,000 nmi (1,900 km; 1,200 mi) at 10.0 kn (18.5 km/h; 11.5 mph)
- Complement: 32
- Armament: 1 × 13.2 mm machine gun; 22 × depth charges; 1 × dunking hydrophone; 1 × simple sonar

Cha-186 or No. 186 (Japanese: 第百八十六號驅潜特務艇) was a No.1-class auxiliary submarine chaser of the Imperial Japanese Navy that served during World War II and with Japan during the post-war period.

== History ==
Her construction was authorized under the Maru Sen Programme (Ship # 2001–2100). She was laid down on 3 May 1944 as ship 2036 at the Ichikawa Shipyard (jp:市川造船所) in Ujiyamada and launched on 6 July 1944.

She was completed and commissioned on 4 September 1944, fitted with armaments at the Yokosuka Naval Arsenal, and assigned to the Yokosuka Defense squadron, Yokosuka Defense Force, Yokosuka Naval District and tasked with securing Tokyo Bay. She operated out of Uraga, Kanagawa with patrols to Tateyama, Chiba. On 7 September 1944, she was assigned to the Shimoda, Shizuoka patrol unit. On 4 March 1945, she was assigned to Tateyama guard area. On 15 May 1945, she was assigned to the Tsushima Defense Force, Kanmon Straits Defense Unit. On 5 June 1945, she was assigned to the Shimonoseki Defense Corps. Cha-186 survived the war and was decommissioned on 30 November 1945.

On 1 December 1945, she was enrolled as a minesweeper by the occupation forces, one of 269 Japanese ships that served as a minesweeper under the Allied forces after the war. She conducted minesweeping operations based out of Shimonoseki and later Kure and then Osaka. On 1 August 1947, she was demobilized and on 28 August 1947, she was released to the Ministry of Transportation.

On 1 May 1948, she was assigned to the Japan Maritime Safety Agency, a sub-agency of the Ministry of Transportation, and designated on 23 August 1948 as patrol vessel Hatsukari (はつかり) (PB-13). On 1 July 1950, she was re-designated as patrol vessel Hatsukari (PS-13). On 1 July 1951, she was re-designated as patrol vessel Hatsukari (PS-131). She was delisted on 20 November 1956.
