= USS Archerfish (SS-311) =

WWII-era United States Navy submarine

Coordinates: 32°23′0″N 122°58′6″W

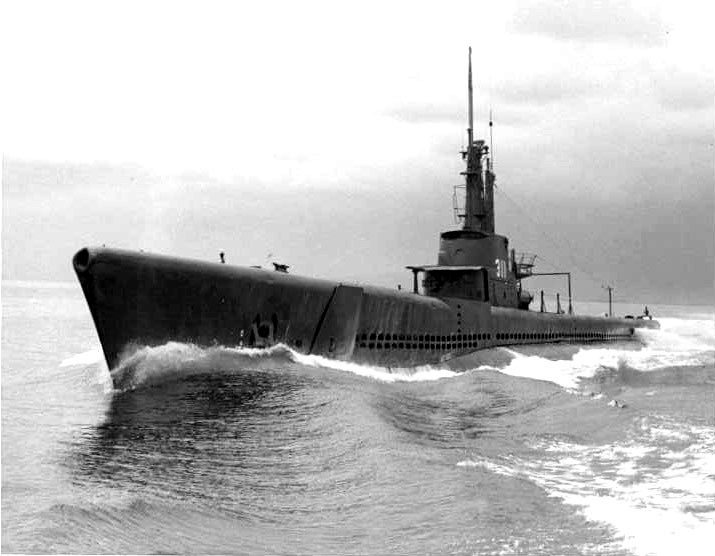
- USS Archerfish (SS-311)

History

United States
- Namesake: Archerfish
- Builder: Portsmouth Naval Shipyard, Kittery, Maine
- Laid down: 22 January 1943
- Launched: 28 May 1943
- Commissioned: 4 September 1943
- Decommissioned: 12 June 1946
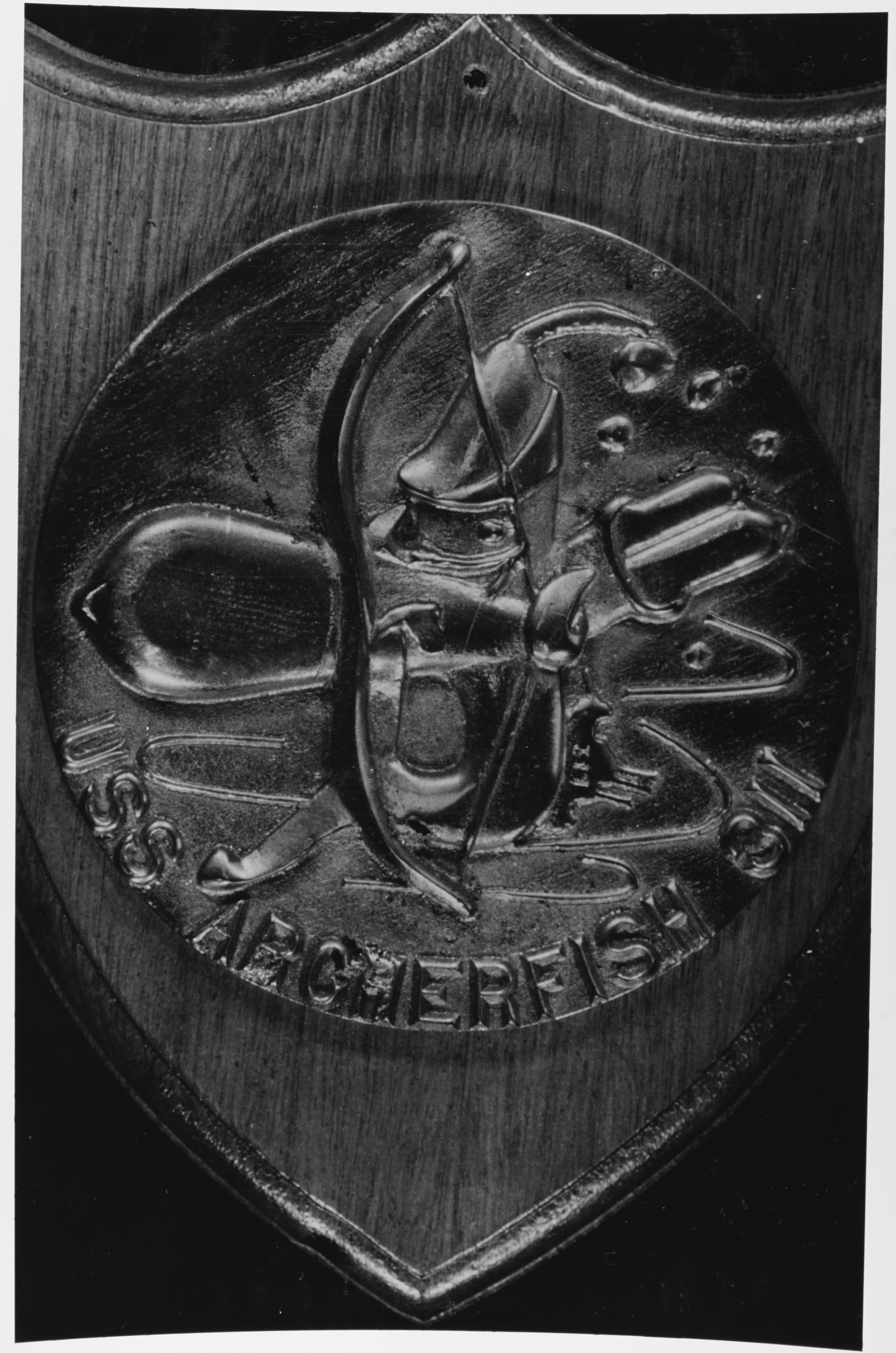
- Badge
- Recommissioned: 6 March 1952
- Decommissioned: 21 October 1955
- Recommissioned: 1 August 1957
- Decommissioned: 1 May 1968
- Stricken: 1 May 1968
- Fate: Sunk as a target off California on 19 October 1968
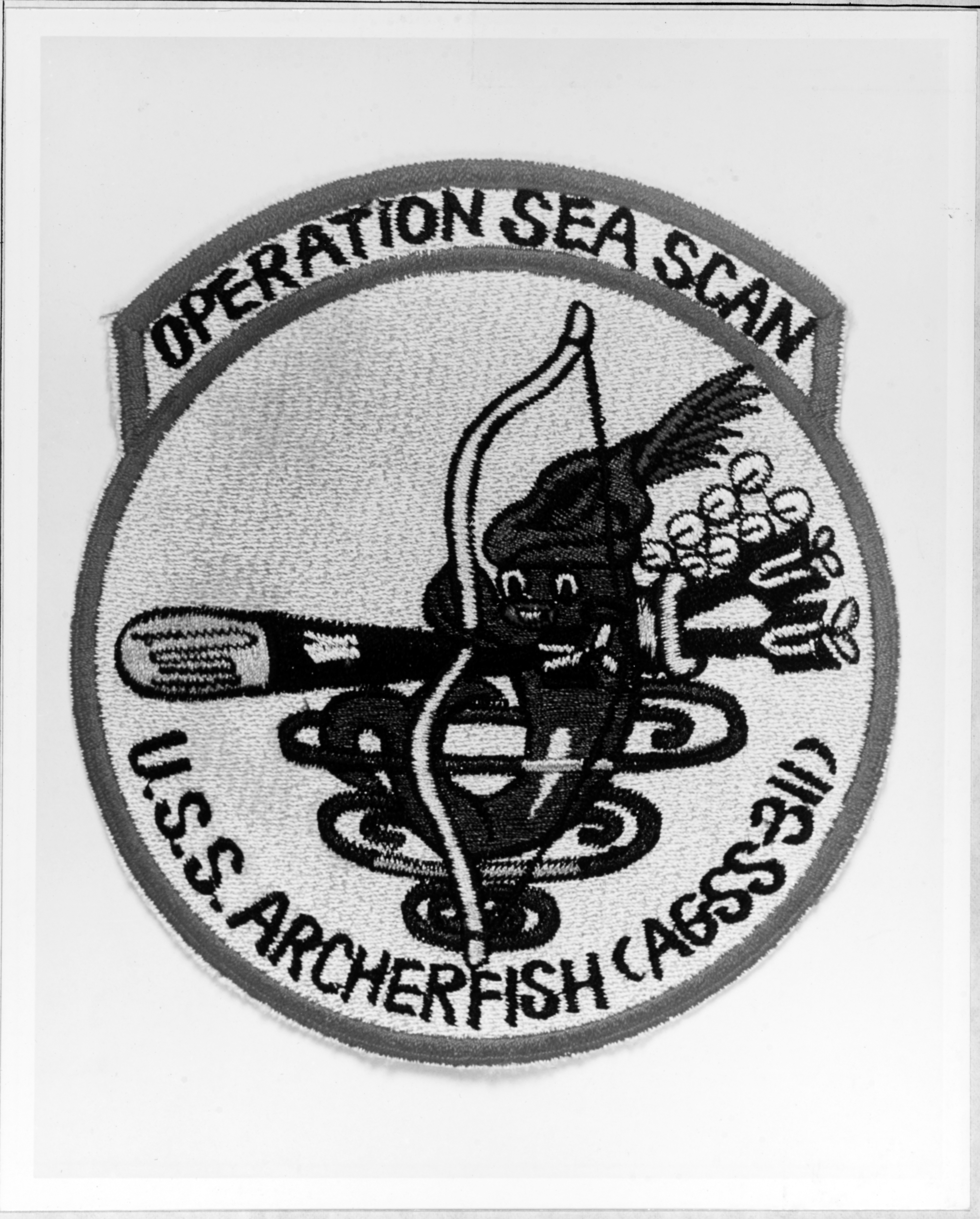
- Badge

General characteristics
- Class & type: Balao-class diesel-electric submarine
- Displacement: 1,526 tons (1,550 t) surfaced, 2,391 tons (2,429 t) submerged
- Length: 311 ft 9 in (95.02 m)
- Beam: 27 ft 3 in (8.31 m)
- Draft: 16 ft 10 in (5.13 m) maximum
- Propulsion: 4 × Fairbanks-Morse Model 38D8-1/8 9-cylinder opposed-piston diesel engines driving electrical generators; 2 × 126-cell Sargo batteries; 4 × high-speed Elliott electric motors with reduction gears; 2 × propellers; 5,400 shp (4.0 MW) surfaced; 2,740 shp (2.04 MW) submerged
- Speed: 20.25 kn (37.50 km/h) surfaced, 8.75 kn (16.21 km/h) submerged
- Range: 11,000 nmi (20,000 km) at 10 kn (19 km/h) surfaced
- Endurance: 48 hours at 2 kn (3.7 km/h) submerged, 75 days on patrol
- Test depth: 400 ft (120 m)
- Complement: 10 officers, 70–71 enlisted
- Armament: 10 × 21-inch (533 mm) torpedo tubes; 6 forward, 4 aft; 24 torpedoes; 1 × 4-inch (102 mm) / 50 caliber deck gun; Bofors 40 mm and Oerlikon 20 mm cannon

USS Archerfish (SS/AGSS-311) was a Balao-class submarine. She was the first ship of the United States Navy to be named for the archerfish. Archerfish is best known for sinking the Japanese aircraft carrier Shinano in November 1944, the largest warship ever sunk by a submarine. For this achievement, she received a Presidential Unit Citation after World War II.

== Construction and commissioning ==
Archerfish's keel was laid down on 22 January 1943 in the Portsmouth Navy Yard in Kittery, Maine. She was launched on 28 May 1943, sponsored by Malvina Thompson, the personal secretary to first lady Eleanor Roosevelt. The boat was commissioned on 4 September 1943.

== World War II ==
Archerfish underwent shakedown training through the first part of November off the New England coast, and headed for Hawaii via the Panama Canal. She arrived at Pearl Harbor on 29 November 1943 and joined the Pacific Fleet.

=== First four patrols, December 1943 – September 1944 ===
After receiving voyage repairs and undergoing training exercises, Archerfish got under way on 23 December, for her first war patrol. She paused at Midway Atoll on 27 December, to refuel before proceeding to her patrol area north of Taiwan. During this patrol, she attacked three ships, but scored no kills before returning to Midway on 16 February 1944 for repairs and training.

The submarine stood out of Midway on 16 March 1944 on her second war patrol but encountered no Japanese targets during her 42 days at sea, mostly near the Palau Islands. She returned to the Submarine Base at Pearl Harbor via Johnston Island on 27 April, to commence refitting.

A month and a day later, Archerfish left Pearl Harbor, bound for the Bonin Islands area and her third patrol. She was assigned lifeguard duty during the strikes against Iwo Jima on 4 July, and rescued downed aviator Ensign John B. Anderson before returning to Midway on 15 July.

After a refit alongside submarine tender Proteus and training exercises, Archerfish got under way again on 7 August, to begin another patrol. She prowled the waters off Honshū for more than a month without bagging any enemy ships, and returned to Pearl Harbor on 29 September, after 53 days at sea.

=== Fifth patrol, October–December 1944: Sinking Shinano ===
Archerfish left Hawaii on 30 October, under the command of Commander Joseph F. Enright, visited Saipan on 9 November, for quick voyage repairs, and departed two days later to carry out her next patrol, in which her primary mission was to provide lifeguard services for the first B-29 Superfortress strikes against Tokyo. On 28 November, she received word that no air raids would be launched that day, giving her carte blanche to roam the waters near Tokyo Bay. That evening, lookouts spotted what looked like a tanker leaving the bay. It was later discovered that it was actually a large aircraft carrier screened by three destroyers (Hamakaze, Yukikaze, Isokaze) and a submarine chaser (Cha-241).

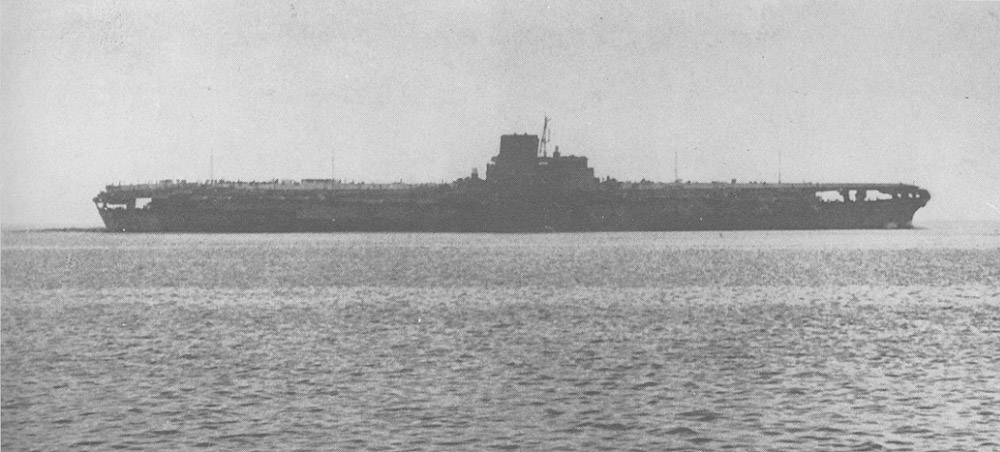
Shinano underway during sea trials in Tokyo Bay

Enright ordered the carrier tracked from ahead in preparation for an attack from below. After six hours, the enemy carrier turned back into Archerfish's path, and Archerfish got into an attack position. Archerfish submerged and fired six torpedoes, four of which found their mark. Enright deliberately set the torpedoes to run shallow (10 ft or 3 m) in hopes of capsizing the target by holing it higher up on its hull. He also wanted to increase the chances of a hit in case the torpedoes ran deeper than set. Before Archerfish descended to 400 ft (120 m) to avoid a depth charge attack, Enright saw that the carrier was listing to starboard. The crew began picking up loud breaking-up noises from the target shortly after firing the last torpedo. The noises continued for 47 minutes.

The patrol ended at Guam on 15 December, after 48 days on station. Initially, the Office of Naval Intelligence thought that Archerfish had sunk a cruiser, not believing that there were any carriers in that stretch of ocean. However, Enright had made sketches of the target, and Archerfish was given credit for sinking a 28,000-ton carrier.

It was only after the war that the Americans learned the identity of Archerfish's quarry: Shinano, the biggest aircraft carrier ever built at the time. It was originally the third of the Yamato-class battleships, but had been converted into a 72,000-ton supercarrier after the Battle of Midway. Four of Archerfish's six torpedoes had hit, striking the carrier between the anti-torpedo bulge and the waterline at approximately 03:20. The damage was magnified by the fact that Shinano had turned south just minutes before Enright loosed his torpedoes, thus exposing her entire side to Archerfish—a nearly ideal firing situation for a submarine. Task group commander Toshio Abe erroneously believed that Archerfish was part of a wolfpack rather than a lone opponent, and inadvertently turned into the sub's path several times while trying to outrun it. He even went as far as to order one of his destroyer escorts to turn back when it tried to engage Archerfish, believing the sub was being used as a decoy to give the wolfpack a clear shot at Shinano. The ship initially continued under way, but it lost power around 06:00. The crew were unable to contain the flooding due to serious design flaws and inexperience, and the carrier capsized just before 11:00. Archerfish received the Presidential Unit Citation and Enright received the Navy Cross for this action. Shinano is the largest warship to be sunk by a submarine.

=== Last two patrols, January–September 1945 ===
While her officers and crew spent the holidays at a rest and recreation camp located on Guam, Archerfish underwent refit at the island. On 10 January 1945, the submarine got underway for her sixth patrol. Enright was in command of "Joe's Jugheads", a three-submarine wolfpack comprising Archerfish, Batfish, and Blackfish. This mission took her to waters in the South China Sea off Hong Kong and the southern tip of Formosa. She damaged one unidentified target and claimed a submarine on 14 February 1945 during this patrol which ended on 3 March, three days earlier than scheduled, due to bow-plane problems. (The submarine sinking was not confirmed until after the war.) Archerfish touched at Saipan and Pearl Harbor before arriving back in the United States at San Francisco, California on 13 March. She then proceeded to the Hunters Point Navy Yard for overhaul and drydocking.

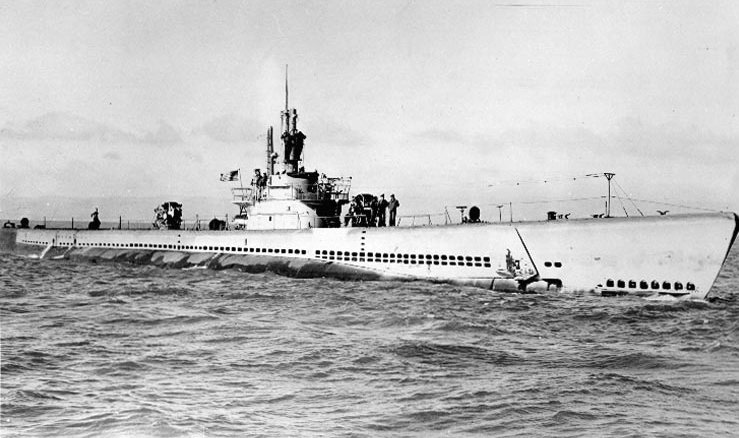
Archerfish undergoing a sea test on 5 June 1945 near San Francisco

Following completion of the yard work, Archerfish sailed on 14 June, for Oahu. She arrived at Pearl Harbor on 22 June, and commenced voyage repairs and training exercises. The submarine got underway on 10 July, for her seventh and last war patrol, which she conducted in the area off the east coast of Honshū and the south coast of Hokkaidō, providing lifeguard services for Superfortresses striking the Japanese home islands. She was still off Hokkaidō on 15 August, when word of the Japanese capitulation arrived. Archerfish was one of 12 submarines that entered Tokyo Bay on 31 August, and moored alongside tender Proteus, near the Yokosuka Navy Yard. After the formal Japanese surrender on 2 September, Archerfish departed Tokyo Bay, bound for Pearl Harbor, and arrived there on 12 September. She was then assigned to Submarine Squadron 1 (SubRon 1) for duty and training.

=== Post-war ===
The submarine left Pearl Harbor on 2 January 1946, bound for San Francisco. From 8 January, to 13 March, the ship's force carried out her preinactivation overhaul. On the latter day, she proceeded to the Mare Island Naval Shipyard where the final stages of inactivation were completed. Archerfish was decommissioned on 12 June 1946 and placed in the Pacific Reserve Group berthed at Mare Island.

== 1952–1955 ==
During the Korean War, many inactive Navy vessels were recommissioned. Archerfish was chosen for recommissioning on 7 January 1952. She was recommissioned on 7 March and reported for duty to the Pacific Fleet on 26 March. The next day she sailed for three weeks of shakedown training out of San Diego, California. However, a fire broke out in her maneuvering room on 28 March, and the ship returned to Mare Island under her own power for a restricted availability to have the damage corrected.

With repairs complete on 27 May, Archerfish held shakedown off the West Coast. She then transited the Panama Canal and joined the Atlantic Fleet on 3 July. Attached to SubRon 12, she operated out of Key West, Florida, visiting such places as Santiago and Guantánamo Bay, Cuba; Port-au-Prince, Haiti; San Juan, Puerto Rico; and Trinidad, British West Indies. The vessel departed Key West on 25 April 1955 and proceeded to the Philadelphia Naval Shipyard for decommissioning. After completing her inactivation overhaul, the ship was towed to Atlantic Reserve Fleet, New London in New London, Connecticut, and was decommissioned on 21 October 1955.

== Oceanographic work, 1958–1964 ==
Archerfish was reactivated at New London in July 1957, placed back in commission on 1 August, and again joined SubRon 12 at Key West. On 13 January 1958, she got underway for a cruise under the technical supervision of the Navy Hydrographic Office. On this deployment, she visited Recife, Brazil, and Trinidad. Upon completion of that mission she provided services for the fleet training commands at Key West and Guantánamo Bay. (In this time, she also portrayed the USS Sea Tiger in the 1959 movie Operation Petticoat for the underwater and distance scenes and shots.)

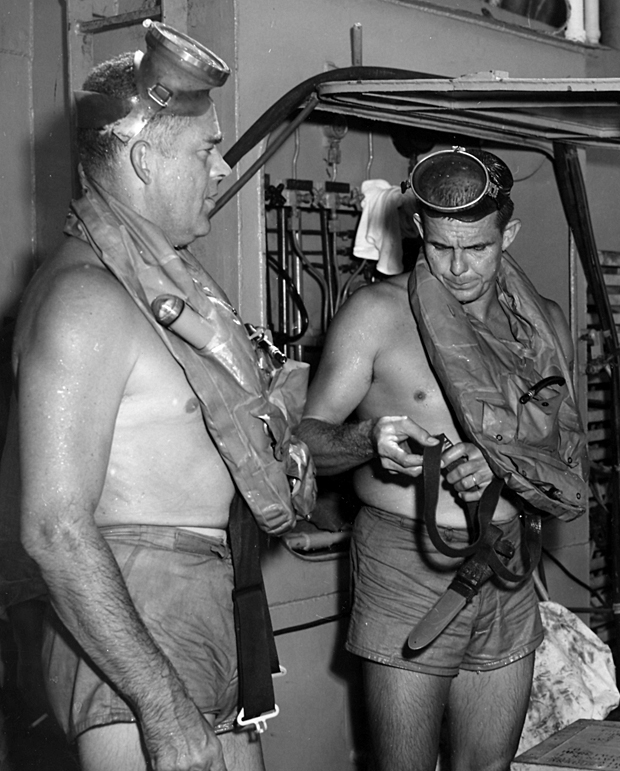
Dr. George Bond and Chief Engineman Cyril Tuckfield following record buoyant ascent in 1959.

On 2 October 1959, approximately 15 miles southwest of Key West, over Vestal Shoal, Archerfish bottomed at 322 feet (98 m). Commander George F. Bond and Chief Engineman Cyril Tuckfield safely completed a 52-second, 302-foot buoyant ascent from the forward escape trunk. Both men received the Legion of Merit in 1960 for establishing the feasibility of deep submarine escape by locking out.

In early 1960, Archerfish was chosen to participate in Operation "Sea Scan", a scientific study of marine weather conditions, water composition, ocean depths, and temperature ranges. She entered the Philadelphia Naval Shipyard in January to be specially equipped for this new mission. During this time, the vessel was redesignated an auxiliary submarine, with hull classification symbol AGSS-311. Embarking a team of civilian scientists, she commenced the first phase of "Sea Scan" on 18 May. On the cruise, the submarine visited Portsmouth, England; Hammerfest and Bergen, Norway; Faslane, Scotland; Thule, Godthaab, and Julianehab, Greenland; Belfast, Northern Ireland; and Halifax, Nova Scotia, before mooring at New London on 3 December.

After six weeks of upkeep, Archerfish got underway on 20 January 1961 for the Pacific phase of "Sea Scan", transited the Panama Canal on 6 February, and proceeded via San Diego to Hawaii. She left Pearl Harbor on 27 March. During her operations the submarine visited Yokosuka and Hakodate, Japan, Hong Kong; Subic Bay, Philippines; Bangkok, Thailand; Penang, Malaya; Colombo, Ceylon; and Fremantle, Australia, and closed out 1961 moored at Yokosuka.

Phase two of Operation "Sea Scan" continued during the early months of 1962 with operations in the western Pacific area and port calls at Sasebo, Japan, Guam, and Cebu City, Philippines. Early in March, the submarine completed phase two and proceeded via Pago Pago to Pearl Harbor. On 27 April, she entered the San Francisco Naval Shipyard for overhaul. After completion of overhaul, the submarine moved to San Diego for a two-week upkeep. She then commenced phase three of "Sea Scan" in the eastern Pacific area, with stops in Pearl Harbor and Midway Atoll, and returned to San Diego for the Christmas holidays.

Archerfish departed San Diego on 10 January 1963, bound for Yokosuka, where she began a three-week upkeep period. Following two and one-half months of operations she returned to the United States for a brief visit to San Francisco, California, before reentering Pearl Harbor early in May. Late May and most of June were devoted to surveying off the northwest coast of the United States and Canada, with port calls in Portland, Oregon; Seattle, Washington; and Vancouver, British Columbia. The submarine was back in Yokosuka for drydocking in July and August before beginning three months of continuous surveying in the mid-Pacific, broken only by brief fuelling and upkeep stops at Midway and Pearl Harbor. She departed Yokosuka on 25 November, for an extended cruise to the southern hemisphere, arrived in Australia in mid-December and took a three-week holiday in Newcastle and Sydney. From the latter port, Archerfish travelled to Guam for a two-week upkeep in late January 1964 and finally reached Pearl Harbor on 5 March.

Departing Pearl Harbor on 30 March, the ship continued "Sea Scan" operations in the eastern Pacific. She visited San Francisco in April and Vancouver, in May before returning to Pearl Harbor on 25 May, ending the third phase of "Sea Scan".

Archerfish began an extended fourth and final phase of Operation "Sea Scan" when she left Pearl Harbor on 17 June, and headed for the eastern Pacific. She made port calls during July at Seattle and Olympia, Washington, and returned to Pearl Harbor on 19 August, for a three-week upkeep and drydocking before undertaking a cruise to the South Pacific. The submarine sailed on 9 September, for the Fiji Islands. After briefly touching Suva, she headed for Auckland, New Zealand, for an 11-day visit. Her next stop was Wellington, New Zealand, but she left New Zealand on 19 October, and arrived in Yokosuka on 6 November. She got underway again on 27 November, to continue survey operations in the Caroline Islands area. After spending New Year's Eve in Guam, the ship sailed for Subic Bay, Philippines, where she closed the year in upkeep.

== 1965–1968 ==
During the remaining three and a half years of her Navy career Archerfish carried out various research assignments in the eastern Pacific. In early 1968, Archerfish was declared unfit for further naval service and was struck from the Naval Vessel Register on 1 May 1968. She was towed to a target position off San Diego and sunk by a torpedo fired from the submarine Snook (SSN-592) on 17 October 1968.

== Awards ==
- Presidential Unit Citation
- Asiatic-Pacific Campaign Medal with seven battle stars for World War II service
- Navy Occupation Service Medal with "ASIA" clasp
