= Japanese submarine chaser Cha-215 =

History

Imperial Japanese Navy
- Name: Cha-215
- Builder: Tokushima Joint Shipbuilding Co., Ltd., Tokushima
- Laid down: 13 January 1944
- Launched: 1944
- Completed: 15 August 1944
- Commissioned: 15 August 1944
- Decommissioned: 30 November 1945
- Home port: Saiki; Tokuyama (from 10 June 1945)
- Fate: released to the Ministry of Transportation, 1 January 1948

Japan Maritime Safety Agency
- Acquired: 20 August 1948
- Renamed: Minesweeper No. 215 (MS-16), 20 August 1948; Minesweeper Special No. 215 (MS-16), 20 October 1949; Tomozuru (MS-16), 1 December 1951
- Fate: transferred to Japan Maritime Self-Defense Force, 1 July 1954

Japan Maritime Self-Defense Force
- Acquired: 1 July 1954
- Decommissioned: 31 March 1962
- Renamed: Tomozuru (MSI-693), 1 September 1957
- Fate: unknown

General characteristics
- Class & type: No.1-class submarine chaser
- Displacement: 130 long tons (132 t) standard
- Length: 29.20 m (95 ft 10 in) overall
- Beam: 5.65 m (18 ft 6 in)
- Draught: 1.97 m (6 ft 6 in)
- Propulsion: 1 × intermediate diesel; shingle shaft, 400 bhp (300 kW)
- Speed: 11.0 knots (20.4 km/h; 12.7 mph)
- Range: 1,000 nmi (1,900 km; 1,200 mi) at 10.0 kn (18.5 km/h; 11.5 mph)
- Complement: 32
- Armament: 1 × 13.2 mm machine gun; 22 × depth charges; 1 × dunking hydrophone; 1 × simple sonar

Cha-215 or No. 215 (Japanese: 第二百十五號驅潜特務艇) was a No.1-class auxiliary submarine chaser of the Imperial Japanese Navy that served during World War II.

== History ==
She was laid down on 13 January 1944 at the Tokushima shipyard of Tokushima Joint Shipbuilding Co., Ltd. (徳島合同造船株式會社) and launched later in the year. She was completed and commissioned on 15 August 1944, fitted with armaments at the Kure Naval Arsenal, and assigned to the Saiki Defense Unit, Kure Naval District. In December 1944, Captain Shunji Inuchi (井内 俊治) was appointed as commanding officer and on 10 June 1945, she was assigned to the Tokuyama Defense Force, Kure Naval District.

She mostly conducted patrol and minesweeping duties in and around Saiki, Ōita and later Tokuyama. Cha-215 survived the war and was decommissioned on 30 November 1945.

On 1 December 1945, she was demobilized and enrolled as a minesweeper by the occupation forces. On 1 January 1948, she was released to the Ministry of Transportation. On 20 August 1948, she was assigned to the Japan Maritime Safety Agency, a sub-agency of the Ministry of Transportation, and designated on 20 August 1948 as Minesweeper No. 215 (MS-16). On 20 October 1949, she was re-designated as Minesweeper Special No. 215 (MS-16) and on 1 December 1951 she was assigned the name Tomozuru (ともづる) (MS-16). On 1 July 1954, she was transferred to the newly created Japan Maritime Self-Defense Force and re-designated on 1 September 1957 as Tomozuru (MSI-693). She was delisted on 31 March 1962.
