= Osaka Guard District =

The Osaka Guard District (大阪警備府, Osaka Keibifu) was a major navy base for the Imperial Japanese Navy in central Japan during World War II. Located at Osaka 34°42′04″N 135°27′50″E), Osaka Guard District was responsible for guarding the approach to the old capital of Kyoto, the Kansai industrial zone, port of Kobe and the Inland Sea of Japan.

== History ==
The Guard Districts (警備府, Keibifu) were considered second tier naval bases, similar to the first tier Naval Districts (鎮守府), with docking, fueling and resupply facilities, but typically lacked a shipyard or training school. They tended to be established by strategic waterways or major port cities for defensive purposes. In concept, the Guard District was similar to the United States Navy Sea Frontiers concept. the Guard District maintained a small garrison force of ships and Naval Land Forces which reported directly to the Guard District commander, and hosted detachments of the numbered fleets on a temporary assignment basis.

Osaka, a strategic port city and location of several shipyards was initially ranked as a third echelon naval port or yokobu (要港部) reporting to the Kure Naval District. The military base itself was established in 1939, but was little more than a base in name only, and was intended to form an administrative structure as legal representative of the Imperial Japanese Navy in the Osaka area. It lacked in any base facilities, not even a repair yard, fueling depot or stores, and it relied on civilian-owned port facilities to service passing warships. Nonetheless, it was raised to the status of Guard District on March 13, 1940.

== Order of Battle at time of the attack on Pearl Harbor ==
- Osaka Guard District
- Komatsujima Air Group
  - 8 × Nakajima E8N Dave
  - 8 × Kawanishi E7K Alf
- Osaka Guard Force
- Kii Defense Unit
- Minesweeper Division 32 (Eguchi Maru, Senyu Maru No. 2, Takashima Maru)

== List of commanders ==
=== Commanding Officer ===
- Vice-Admiral Masashi Kobayashi (20 Nov 1941 – 9 Mar 1943)
- Vice-Admiral Kakusaburo Makita (9 Mar 1943 – 1 Apr 1944)
- Vice-Admiral Ichiro Ono (1 Apr 1944 – 1 Nov 1944)
- Vice-Admiral Arata Oka (1 Nov 1944 – 30 Nov 1945)

=== Chief of Staff ===
- Rear-Admiral Shinichi Torigoe (20 Nov 1941 – 13 Aug 1943)
- Rear-Admiral Bunjiro Yamaguchi (13 Aug 1943 – 26 Feb 1945)
- Rear-Admiral Akira Maysuzaki (26 Feb 1945 – 30 Nov 1945)
