= 7th Fleet (Imperial Japanese Navy) =

The 7th Fleet (第七艦隊, Dai-nana Kantai) was a fleet of the Imperial Japanese Navy during World War II, primarily responsible for control of the Tsushima Strait.

== History ==
The IJN 7th Fleet was formed on 15 April 1945, during the closing stages of World War II. It was essentially an administrative fleet tasked with coordinating local defenses and control of the sea lanes between northern Kyūshū and far western Honshū, and the Korean Peninsula. It was headquartered at Moji-ku, Kitakyūshū. The “fleet” was assigned an old minelayer, converted merchant vessels and a small number of anti-submarine patrol boats, so that its actual combat potential was almost nonexistent. It was disbanded at the end of World War II.

The commander of the IJN 7th Fleet concurrently held the post of commander in chief of the 1st Escort Fleet.

== Commanders of the IJN 7th Fleet ==
Commander in chief
Rank	Name	Date
Vice-Admiral	Fukuji Kishi	15 Apr 1945 – 20 Aug 1945
Vice-Admiral	Sentarō Ōmori	20 Aug 1945 – 15 Sep 1945

Chief of staff
Rank	Name	Date
Rear-Admiral	Mitsutaro Goto	10 April 1945 – 10 July 1945
Rear-Admiral	Kiyoma Fujiwara	10 July 1945 – 15 September 1945
