= No.1-class =

No.1-class may refer to:

- No.1-class auxiliary minelayer, built 1941 – 1942
- No.1-class auxiliary minesweeper, built 1941 – 1943
- No.1-class auxiliary submarine chaser, built c. 1942 – 1945
- No.1-class escort ship, built 1943 – 1946
- No.1-class landing ship, built 1943 – 1945
- No.1-class minesweeper, built 1922 – 1929
- No.1-class patrol boat, built 1940
- No.1-class submarine chaser, built 1933 – 1936

== See also ==
- Kaiyō No.1-class oceanographic research ship
