= Japanese cruiser Naka =

Sendai-class warship (1925–1944)

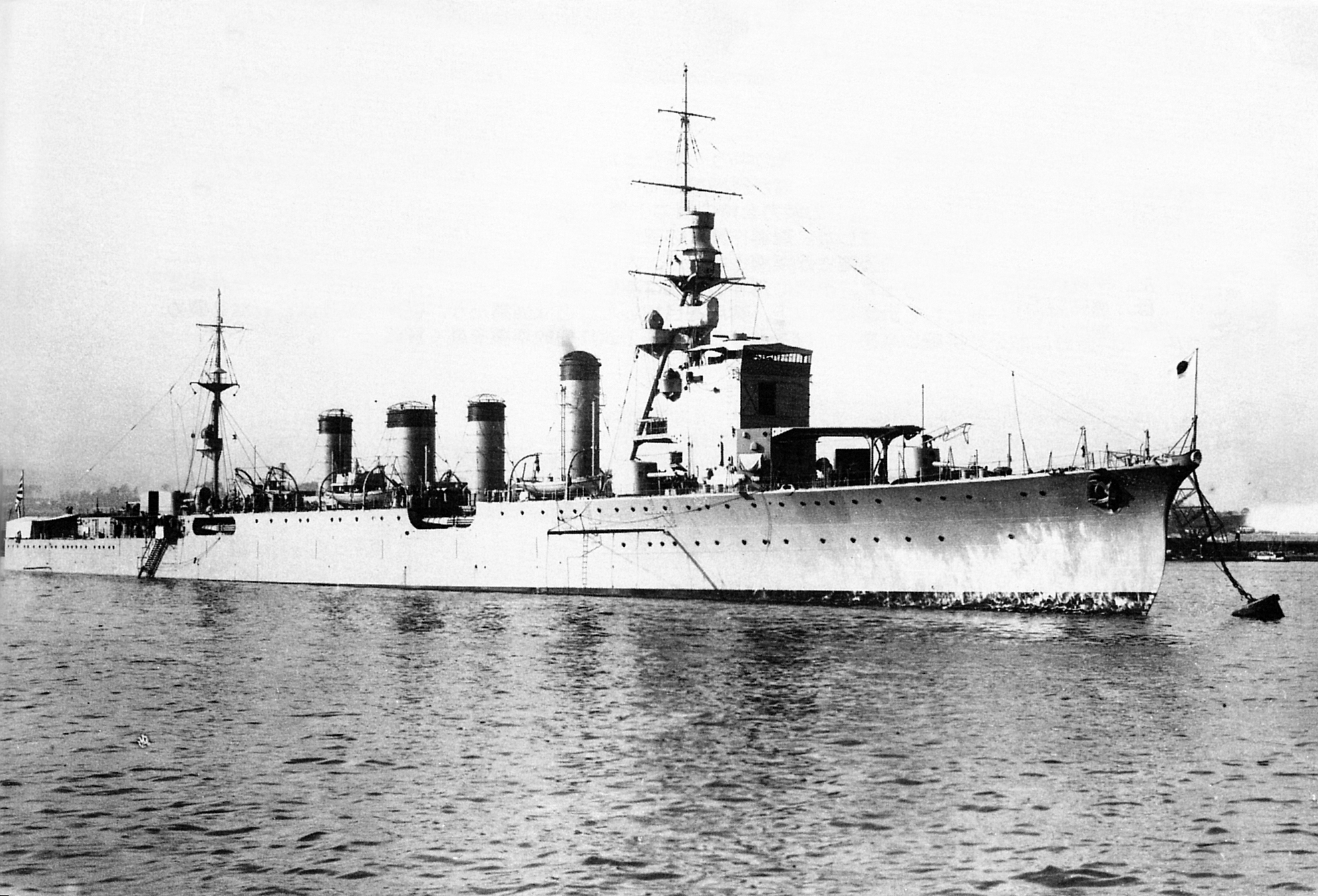
- Naka in 1925, at Yokohama prior to commissioning

History

Empire of Japan
- Name: Naka
- Namesake: Naka River
- Ordered: 1920 Fiscal Year
- Builder: Mitsubishi
- Laid down: 10 June 1922
- Launched: 24 March 1925
- Commissioned: 30 November 1925
- Stricken: 31 March 1944
- Fate: sunk 18 February 1944; bombed by USN carrier aircraft near Truk; 07°15′N 151°15′E.

General characteristics
- Class & type: Sendai-class light cruiser
- Displacement: 5,195 long tons (5,278 t) (standard)
- Length: 152.4 m (500 ft 0 in)
- Beam: 14.2 m (46 ft 7 in)
- Draft: 4.9 m (16 ft 1 in)
- Installed power: 90,000 shp (67,000 kW)
- Propulsion: 4 × Parsons geared turbines; 10 × Kampon boilers; 4 × shafts
- Speed: 35.3 kn (65.4 km/h; 40.6 mph)
- Range: 5,000 nmi (9,000 km; 6,000 mi) at 14 kn (26 km/h; 16 mph)
- Complement: 452
- Armament: 7 × 140 mm (5.5 in)/50 guns (7x1); 2 × 80 mm (3 in)/40 anti-aircraft guns; 8 × 610 mm (24 in) torpedo tubes (4x2); 48 × mines
- Armor: Belt: 64 mm (2.5 in); Deck: 29 mm (1.1 in)
- Aircraft carried: 1 × floatplane
- Aviation facilities: 1 × catapult

Naka (那珂) was a Sendai-class light cruiser in the Imperial Japanese Navy (IJN), named after the Naka River in the Tochigi and Ibaraki prefectures of eastern Japan. Naka was the third (and final) vessel completed in the Sendai class of light cruisers, and like other vessels of her class, she was intended for use as the flagship of a destroyer flotilla.

== Service career ==
Naka was completed at Mitsubishi Yokohama on 30 November 1925.

On 26 November 1941, Naka became flagship of 4th Destroyer Flotilla under Rear Admiral Shōji Nishimura. At the time of the attack on Pearl Harbor, Naka was engaged in the invasion of the southern Philippines as part of Vice Admiral Ibo Takahashi's Third Fleet escorting transports with components of the IJA 48th Infantry Division. Naka was slightly damaged by strafing by five Boeing B-17 Flying Fortress bombers and Seversky P-35 Guardsman and Curtiss P-40 Kittyhawk fighters of the United States Army Air Forces (USAAF) Far East Air Force.

In January 1942, 4th Destroyer Flotilla was assigned to the invasion of the Netherlands East Indies, escorting a convoy carrying the Kure No. 2 Special Naval Landing Force (SNLF) and Sakaguchi Brigade to Tarakan and Balikpapan, Borneo. On 24 January 1942 while landing troops at Balikpapan, the Royal Netherlands Navy submarine HNLMS K XVIII, operating on the surface due to poor weather, fired four torpedoes at Naka, but missed. While Admiral Nishimura ordered Naka and her destroyers in an unsuccessful pursuit of the submarine, USN Task Force 5 comprising the destroyers USS Parrott, Pope, John D. Ford and Paul Jones attacked the now unprotected Japanese convoy, sinking several transports.

In late February 1942, 4th Destroyer Flotilla escorted transports with the 48th Infantry Division to Makassar, Celebes and eastern Java. Ahead of the convoy were 2nd Destroyer Flotilla (flagship light cruiser Jintsū) and the cruisers Nachi and Haguro. Naka was thus in a central position for the Battle of the Java Sea on 27 February 1942.

At 1547, the Japanese cruisers Haguro, Nachi and Jintsū with destroyers Inazuma, Yukikaze, Tokitsukaze, Amatsukaze and Hatsukaze, Ushio, Sazanami, Yamakaze and Kawakaze engaged Dutch Rear Admiral Karel W. F. M. Doorman's Strike Force consisting of two heavy cruisers (HMS Exeter and USS Houston), three light cruisers (HNLMS De Ruyter (Doorman's flagship), HNLMS Java, HMAS Perth), and nine destroyers (HMS Electra, HMS Encounter, HMS Jupiter, HNLMS Kortenaer, HNLMS Witte de With, USS Alden, USS John D. Edwards, USS John D. Ford, and USS Paul Jones).

At 1603, Naka and its destroyer squadron with Asagumo, Minegumo, Murasame, Harukaze, Samidare and Yūdachi launched 43 Type 93 Long Lance torpedoes at the Allied force from about 16,250 yards (14,860 m); sinking Kortenaer. The destroyers launched 56 torpedoes in addition to 8 torpedoes from Naka, but amazingly failed to hit anything. Asagumo closed with the Electra, sinking it in a gun battle. Jupiter hit a Dutch mine and sank. Towards midnight, De Ruyter and Java were hit by torpedoes and exploded. This engagement was followed by the Battle of Sunda Strait, the next day on 28 February 1942, at which Naka was not present.

In March, Naka was assigned patrol duties between Java and the Celebes. However, on 14 March 1942, Naka received orders to become flagship for the Christmas Island invasion force. The force consisted of Naka, 16th Cruiser Division's Nagara and Natori, 9th Destroyer Division's Minegumo and Natsugumo, 22nd Destroyer Division's Satsuki, Minazuki, Fumizuki and Nagatsuki, 16th Destroyer Division's Amatsukaze and Hatsukaze, oiler Akebono Maru and transports Kimishima Maru and Kumagawa Maru. Landing operations progressed without opposition on 31 March 1942, however, the submarine USS Seawolf fired four torpedoes at Naka, but all missed. Seawolf tried again with two more torpedoes the following day, 1 April 1942, and this time one hit to starboard near her No. 1 boiler. Natori towed the badly damaged Naka to Bantam Bay, Java for temporary repairs, and Naka then proceeded to Singapore under her own power. The damage was sufficient to justify a return to Japan for further repairs in June. Naka remained in Japan in reserve until April 1943.

On 1 April 1943, Naka was assigned to the new 14th Cruiser Division under Rear Admiral Kenzo Ito with Isuzu, arriving at Truk on 30 April 1943. For the next several months, Naka was assigned to make troop transport runs around the Marshall Islands and Nauru. On 21 October 1943, Naka and Isuzu embarked Army troops at Shanghai. The convoy was intercepted by the submarine USS Shad in the East China Sea on 23 October 1943, which fired 10 torpedoes, failing to damage either cruiser. On 3 November 1943, convoy was attacked 60 nautical miles (111 km) north of Kavieng by 13th Air Force Consolidated B-24 Liberator bombers. Naka suffered a near-miss, and arrived at Rabaul on 5 November 1943, the same day as the Carrier Raid on Rabaul. Naka was slightly damaged by near-misses from dive bombers from the aircraft carriers USS Saratoga and Princeton. On 23 November 1943, Naka departed Ponape with troop reinforcements for Tarawa, but the island fell to the Americans before the reinforcements could be landed.

From 17–18 February 1944, Naka assisted light cruiser Agano, which had been torpedoed the day before by the submarine USS Skate. Immediately after Naka departed, Truk was attacked by US Navy Task Force 58 in Operation Hailstone. The Americans sank 31 transports and 10 naval vessels (two cruisers, four destroyers and four auxiliary vessels), destroyed nearly 200 aircraft and damaged severely about 100 more, eliminating Truk as a major base for the IJN. Naka was attacked 35 nautical miles (65 km) west of Truk by three waves of Curtiss SB2C Helldivers and Grumman TBF Avengers from the aircraft carrier USS Bunker Hill and TBFs of VT-25 of the carrier Cowpens. The first two strikes failed to score a hit, but Naka was hit by a torpedo and a bomb in the third strike and broke in two, sinking at 07°15′N 151°15′E. Some 240 crewmen perished, but patrol boats rescued 210 men including Captain Sutezawa.

Naka was removed from the navy list on 31 March 1944.
