= Battle of Christmas Island =

1942 battle in the Pacific during WWII

- Part of the Indian Ocean in World War II, the Pacific War, and World War II
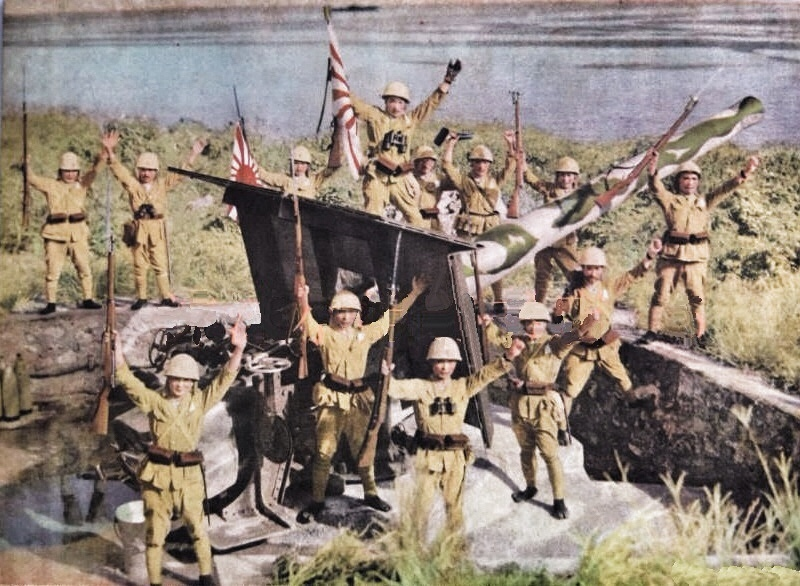
- Japanese marines in Christmas Island, 1942
Date	31 March − 1 April 1942
Location	Christmas Island 10°29′24″S 105°37′48″E
Result	Japanese victory
Territorial changes	Christmas Island occupied by Japanese forces

Belligerents
United Kingdom; India; United States	(Empire of Japan) Japan

Commanders and leaders
	(Empire of Japan) Shōji Nishimura

Strength
Land: 32 infantry; Sea: 1 submarine	Land: 850 infantry; Sea: 3 light cruisers; 8 destroyers; 1 oiler; 2 troop transports; Air: 2 seaplanes

Casualties and losses
27 captured	1 light cruiser damaged
- One British officer and four other ranks were killed in a mutiny on 10 March 1942

The Battle of Christmas Island was a small engagement which began on 31 March 1942, during World War II. Assisted by a mutiny of soldiers of the British Indian Army against their British officers, Imperial Japanese Army troops were able to occupy Christmas Island unopposed. The United States Navy submarine Seawolf severely damaged the Imperial Japanese Navy cruiser Naka during the landings.

== Background ==
The island is 360 km (190 nmi) south of Java and about 1,400 nmi (2,600 km) from Perth in Western Australia. The island has an area of 52 sq mi (135 km^{2}) and is an important source of phosphorites. A British possession since 1888, in 1942 it was under the administrative control of the Straits Settlements. Demand for phosphates increased in the 19th century and had been managed by Christmas Island Phosphate Company since 1891. (Note: On 1 January 1891 received a 99-year lease to mine the phosphorites and cut timber.) At the beginning of the Japanese war, the island had a population of 1,664, including 313 women. Most of the people were Malay and Chinese, working at the mine.

=== Military preparations ===
In January 1941, the War Office and Malaya Command discussed the defence needs of the island and decided that two 6-inch guns, with two officers and sixty men, were necessary. No extra troops were to be sent to the island as they could come from Malaya Command. Far East Command (18 November 1940 – 7 January 1942) asked only for signallers, medical and supply personnel. The War Office sent a QF 1-pounder pom-pom gun from India with 100 rounds of ammunition. The garrison was to have enough ammunition to withstand a siege of sixty days and by living off accumulated supplies, to last for ninety days, if cut off from Allied supply. A convoy with a 6-inch gun sailed for Christmas Island from Singapore on 27 March 1942.

== Prelude ==
After the Battle of Java (28 February – 12 March 1942) the Japanese Imperial General Headquarters issued orders for Operation X, the invasion and occupation of Christmas Island, on 14 March 1942. Rear Admiral Shōji Nishimura was assigned to command the Second Southern Expeditionary Fleet's occupation force, with the light cruiser Naka as his flagship. The fleet also consisted of the light cruisers Nagara and Natori and destroyers Minegumo, Natsugumo, Amatsukaze, Hatsukaze, Satsuki, Minazuki, Fumizuki and Nagatsuki. The oiler Akebono Maru and transports Kimishima Maru and Kumagawa Maru, with 850 men of the 21st and 24th special base forces and the 102nd Construction Unit were escorted by the naval force.

The British garrison had a 6-inch (150 mm) gun built in 1900, that was mounted on Christmas Island in 1940. The garrison, a detachment of the Hong Kong and Singapore Royal Artillery numbered 32 troops, led by Captain L. W. T. Williams. The force consisted of an Indian officer, Subadar Muzaffar Khan; 27 Punjabi Indian gunners and non-commissioned officers (NCOs) and four British other ranks.

Some Punjabi troops, apparently believing Japanese propaganda concerning the liberation of India from British rule and probably acting with the tacit support of local Sikh police officers, mutinied. On 11 March, they shot and killed Williams and the four British other ranks – Sergeants Giles and Cross and Gunners Thurgood and Tate – and threw their bodies into the sea. They locked up the district officer and the few other European inhabitants of the island, pending an execution that apparently was thwarted by the Japanese occupation.

== Landing ==
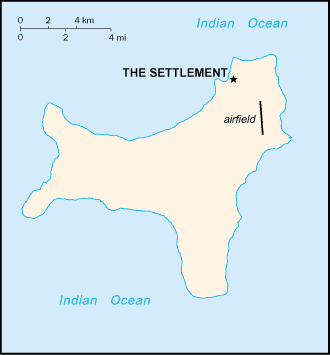
Map of Christmas Island showing the location of Flying Fish Cove (the Settlement)

At dawn on 31 March 1942, a dozen Japanese bombers launched the attack, destroying the radio station. The mutineers signalled their intention to surrender, raising a white flag before the 850-man landing force had come ashore. The Japanese expeditionary corps was able to disembark at Flying Fish Cove without opposition. At 09:49 that morning, the US Navy submarine USS Seawolf fired four torpedoes at Naka and all missed. Seawolf attacked again at 06:50 the following morning, firing three torpedoes at Natori and missing again. That evening, with her last two torpedoes, from 1,100 yd (1,000 m), Seawolf managed to hit Naka on her starboard side, near No. 1 boiler.

Location map of Christmas Island

The damage was severe enough for Naka to be towed back to Singapore by Natori and eventually to Japan for a year of repairs. The other Japanese vessels depth charged Seawolf for over nine hours, but it escaped. Natori returned to Christmas Island and withdrew all elements of the occupation force, with the exception of a 20-man garrison detachment, to Banten Bay, Indonesia, on 3 April 1942. The Japanese gained phosphate rock which was loaded on the transport ships.

== Aftermath ==
Following the occupation, the Japanese garrison attempted to put the Chinese and Malays to work, although many escaped further inland to live off the land. The mutineers also became labourers, cleaning storage bins. Output was small and after Nissei Maru was sunk by the submarine USS Searaven on 17 November 1942, while unloading at the wharf, phosphate production was stopped. Over 60 per cent of the island's population, including the European prisoners, were moved to Java by December 1943. Christmas Island was reoccupied by the British in mid-October 1945.

After the war, seven Punjabi mutineers were traced and court-martialled in Singapore. The first six to be identified and tried were convicted on 13 March 1947. Five were sentenced to death and one was sentenced to two years' imprisonment and discharge with ignominy. King George VI confirmed the death sentences on 13 August 1947. British rule in India ended shortly afterwards with the Partition of India. Pakistan was created before the executions could be carried out and diplomatic niceties had to be taken into account. In October 1947, a seventh mutineer was identified, court-martialled and sentenced to death. An eighth soldier was identified as a participant in the mutiny but was never caught. On 8 December 1947, the death sentences were commuted to penal servitude for life, after the governments of India and Pakistan made representations to the British. After further arguments between Britain and Pakistan over where the sentences should be served, with the British demanding they serve nine years, the six prisoners were transferred to Pakistan in June 1955, after which the British government ended its interest in the case.

== Japanese order of battle ==
Special Naval Landing Forces
Ship	Flag	Class	Notes
Main Force
16th Cruiser Squadron
Natori	Imperial Japanese Navy	Nagara-class cruiser	
Amatsukaze	Imperial Japanese Navy	Kagerō-class destroyer	
Hatsukaze	Imperial Japanese Navy	Kagerō-class destroyer	
Covering Force
9th Destroyer Division (1st Section)
Naka	Imperial Japanese Navy	Sendai-class cruiser	
Natsugumo	Imperial Japanese Navy	Asashio-class destroyer	
P34	Imperial Japanese Navy	No.31-class patrol boat	
P36	Imperial Japanese Navy	No.31-class patrol boat	
Kimishima Maru (1938)	Imperial Japanese Navy	—	5,193 GRT
Kumagawa Maru (1933)	Imperial Japanese Navy	—	7,510 GRT
Transport Unit
SS Akebono Maru (1929)	Imperial Japanese Navy	Kawasaki-type oiler	
Landing Unit (detachments)
21st Special Base Unit	Imperial Japanese Navy	200 men	4 × 120 mm gun, 4 × 81 mm mortar
24th Special Base Unit	Imperial Japanese Navy	450 men	
102nd Construction Unit	Imperial Japanese Navy	200 men	

== See also ==
- Cocos Islands mutiny

== Bibliography ==
- Bertke, Donald A.; Smith, Gordon; Kindell, Don (2014). World War II Sea War: The Allies Strike Back. Vol. VII. Dayton, Ohio: Bertke Publications. ISBN 978-1-93747-011-1.
- Blair, Clay (1976). Silent Victory: The U. S. Submarine War Against Japan. New York: Bantam. ISBN 978-0-55301-050-3.
- Gill, G. Hermon (1968). Royal Australian Navy, 1942–1945. Australia in the War of 1939–1945. Vol. II. Canberra: Australian War Memorial. OCLC 65475 – via Australian War Memorial.
- Hara, Tameichi; Pineau, Roger (2013). Saito, Fred (ed.). Japanese Destroyer Captain. Annapolis, MD: Naval Institute Press. ISBN 978-1-61251-374-4.
- L., Klemen (2000). "The Mystery of Christmas Island, March 1942". Forgotten Campaign: The Dutch East Indies Campaign 1941–1942. Archived from the original on 21 January 2016.
- Piegzik, Mikhal A. (2022). "Chapter 5: Christmas Island Invasion Operation". The Darkest Hour: The Japanese Naval Offensive in the Indian Ocean 1942 – The Opening Moves. Asia@War No.31. Vol. I. Warwick: Helion. pp. 53–61. ISBN 978-1-915070-61-6.
- Woodmore, F. P. (1996). Christmas Island Explorer's Guide. Christmas Island: Lone Island Publications. ISBN 0-646-24998-3.
