= Battle of Tarakan =

Battle of Tarakan may refer to two actions in the Pacific campaign of World War II, on the island of Tarakan, off the north-east coast of Borneo:

- Battle of Tarakan (1942), January 11–12, 1942, the Japanese assault on the island, defeating Allied forces there.
- Battle of Tarakan (1945), May 1–25, 1945, the first phase of the Allied campaign to re-take Borneo.
