= Japanese destroyer Natsugumo (1937) =

Asashio-class destroyer

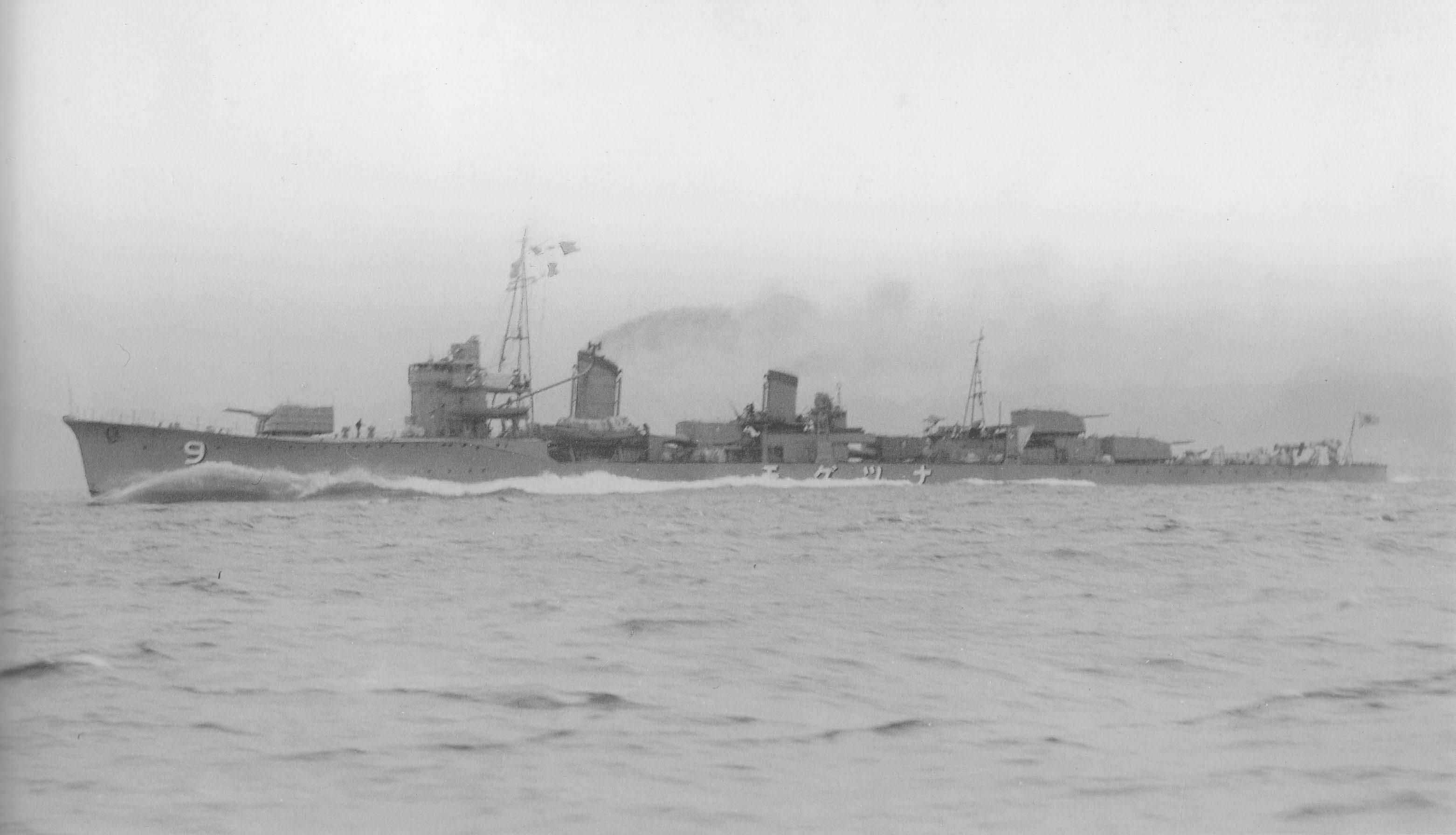
- Natsugumo underway on 22 November 1939

History

Empire of Japan
- Name: Natsugumo
- Ordered: 1934 Maru-2 Program
- Builder: Sasebo Naval Arsenal
- Laid down: 1 July 1936
- Launched: 26 May 1937
- Commissioned: 10 February 1938
- Stricken: 15 November 1942
- Fate: Sunk in air attack, 12 October 1942

General characteristics
- Class & type: Asashio-class destroyer
- Displacement: 2,370 long tons (2,408 t)
- Length: 111 m (364 ft) pp; 115 m (377 ft 4 in)waterline; 118.3 m (388 ft 1 in) OA
- Beam: 10.3 m (33 ft 10 in)
- Draft: 3.7 m (12 ft 2 in)
- Propulsion: 2-shaft geared turbine, 3 boilers, 50,000 shp (37,285 kW)
- Speed: 35 knots (40 mph; 65 km/h)
- Range: 5,700 nmi (10,600 km) at 10 kn (19 km/h); 960 nmi (1,780 km) at 34 kn (63 km/h)
- Complement: 200
- Armament: 6 × 12.7 cm/50 Type 3 DP guns; up to 28 × Type 96 AA guns; up to 4 × Type 93 AA guns; 8 × 24 in (610 mm) torpedo tubes; 36 depth charges

Natsugumo (夏雲, Summer Cloud) was the seventh of ten Asashio-class destroyers built for the Imperial Japanese Navy in the mid-1930s under the Circle Two Supplementary Naval Expansion Program (Maru Ni Keikaku).

== History ==
The Asashio-class destroyers were larger and more capable that the preceding Shiratsuyu-class, as Japanese naval architects were no longer constrained by the provisions of the London Naval Treaty. These light cruiser-sized vessels were designed to take advantage of Japan's lead in torpedo technology, and to accompany the Japanese main striking force and in both day and night attacks against the United States Navy as it advanced across the Pacific Ocean, according to Japanese naval strategic projections. Despite being one of the most powerful classes of destroyers in the world at the time of their completion, none survived the Pacific War.

Natsugumo, built at the Sasebo Naval Arsenal was laid down on 1 July 1936, launched on 26 May 1937 and commissioned on 10 February 1938.

== Operational history ==
At the time of the attack on Pearl Harbor, Natsugumo, under the command of Lieutenant Commander Moritaro Tsukamoto, was assigned to Destroyer Division 9 (Desdiv 9), and a member of Destroyer Squadron 4 (Desron 4) of the IJN 2nd Fleet, escorting the Philippines invasion forces to Vigan and Lingayen. She then assisted in the landings of Japanese forces at Tarakan, Balikpapan, Makassar and Java in the Netherlands East Indies. During the Battle of the Java Sea of 27 February, she was on detached duty escorting the troop convoy and thus did not see combat.

Natsugumo participated in the Battle of Christmas Island from 31 March–10 April, escorting the damaged cruiser Naka to Singapore, and then returning to Yokosuka on April 12 for repairs.

Natsugumo joined the escort for Admiral Nobutake Kondō’s Midway Invasion Force during the Battle of Midway from 4–6 June 1942. Afterwards, she was reassigned to the Ominato Naval District and assigned to patrols of the Kurile Islands and north Pacific to mid-July. However, on 19 July, she received orders to escort the cruiser Chokai from Kure to Truk. From Truk, she made a transport run to Kwajalein and returned to Yokosuka by 8 August.

Natsugumo (left) and Hatsukaze docked in Formosa, 30 July 1940

On 11 August, Natsugumo departed Yokosuka for Truk, and was part of the escort for the aircraft carrier Chitose at the Battle of the Eastern Solomons on 24 August. She was assigned to patrols out of Truk in September, and ordered to Shortland Island in October. During the month of October, she made four “Tokyo Express transport runs to Guadalcanal. On the fourth run, while escorting Nisshin and Chitose, she went to the assistance of the destroyer Murakumo which itself had become the victim of early morning air raids while attempting to assist survivors of the heavy cruiser Furutaka, sunk during the previous night's Battle of Cape Esperance. Attacked by United States Navy dive bombers, near misses ruptured Natsugumos hull, and she sank after only 39 minutes at position 08°40′S 159°20′E approximately 90 nautical miles (170 km; 100 mi) west-northwest of Savo Island. The attack killed 16 crewmen, including her captain (LtCdr Moritaro Tsukamoto); the destroyer Asagumo took off her 176 survivors She was removed from the navy list on 15 November 1942.
