= Japanese landing ship No. 1 =

No.1-class landing ship

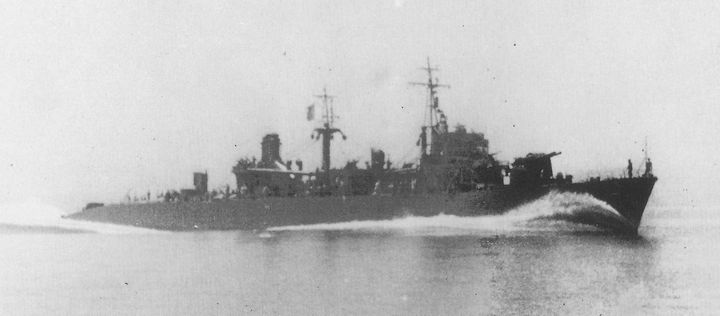
- No. 1 on sea trials, 2 May 1944

Empire of Japan
- Name: No. 1
- Builder: Kure Naval Arsenal
- Laid down: 5 November 1943
- Launched: 8 February 1944
- Completed: 10 May 1944
- Fate: Sunk by American bombers, 27 July 1944

General characteristics
- Class & type: No.1-class landing ship
- Displacement: 1,500 tons (standard)
- Length: 315 ft (96 m) overall
- Beam: 33.1 ft (10.1 m)
- Draught: 11.75 ft (3.58 m)
- Installed power: 2 water-tube boilers; 9,500 shp (7,100 kW)
- Propulsion: 1 shaft, 1 geared steam turbine
- Speed: 22 knots (41 km/h; 25 mph)
- Boats & landing craft carried: 4 × Daihatsu landing craft
- Capacity: 7 × Type 2 Ka-Mi amphibious tanks; 2 × Kō-hyōteki-class submarines
- Sensors & processing systems: 1 × Type 22 search radar; 1 × Type 93 sonar; 1 × 4 Type 93 hydrophone
- Armament: 1 × twin 127 mm (5 in) DP gun; 3 × triple, 1 × twin, 4 × single 25 mm (1 in) AA guns; 4 × throwers for 42 depth charges

No. 1 was a No.1-class landing ship of the Imperial Japanese Navy during the Pacific War. Completed in early 1944, the ship was used as a convoy escort on one successful mission to resupply Imperial Japanese Army units on Saipan. On the return trip, No. 1 was badly damaged by American aircraft and towed to Palau. Redesignated as an anti-aircraft ship, she was sunk by American bombers in July 1944.

== Design ==
No.1-class landing ships were designed as fast amphibious assault ships that could rapidly land troops, vehicles, and cargo. The ships measured 315 ft (96 m) long overall, with a beam of 33.1 ft (10.1 m) and a draught of 11.75 ft (3.58 m). Displacing 1,500 tons at standard load, they were powered by one Kampon geared turbine. It drove one shaft using steam provided by two Kampon 9,500 shaft horsepower (7,100 kW) water-tube boilers. No. 1 was capable of carrying four Daihatsu landing craft; it could also hold seven Type 2 Ka-Mi amphibious tanks or two Kō-hyōteki-class submarines in its hull.

The No.1-class ships were heavily armed; the main armament consisted of a 127 mm (5 in) Type 89 DP gun in a twin-gun mount, as well as ten 25 mm (1 in) Type 96 anti-aircraft guns in three triple, one twin and four single mounts. Forty-two depth charges were also fit on the ships for use by four throwers. No. 1 was fitted with Type 22 search radar; for anti-submarine duties, it was also fit with Type 93 sonar and Type 93 hydrophones.

== History ==
No. 1 was laid down at Kure Naval Arsenal on 5 November 1943 and launched on 8 February 1944. On 10 May, No. 1, with Lieutenant Commander Shinbori Masao in command, was completed and assigned to the Yokosuka Guard Force. On 29 May, No. 1 departed from Tokyo with the torpedo boat Ōtori and three submarine chasers to escort convoy No. 3530 to Saipan, consisting of nine transports carrying troops of the Imperial Japanese Army's 43rd Infantry Division as well as regular supplies. During the journey, No. 1 served as an anti-submarine vessel, conducting sweeps between 1 June to 6 June, but these did not deter American submarines, which sank five transports of the convoy in that time period. On 11 June, the convoy finally arrived at Saipan, but was forced to flee due to the invasion of the island by the United States Marine Corps.

On 13 June, while sailing between Ulithi and Guam, the convoy was attacked by Grumman F6F Hellcat fighter-bombers of Task Force 58, severely damaging No. 1 and disabling her power and navigation functions. Following five days of drifting, the ship was towed to Palau by the transport Akishima Maru on 18 June. After a month of refitting, No. 1 was deployed as a floating anti-aircraft battery off the north shore of Ngargol Island; to camouflage the ship, it was furnished with trees and branches in order to blend in with the shoreline. On 26 July, during an American air attack on Palau, six Curtiss SB2C Helldiver bombers from USS Lexington attacked No. 1; they claimed one bomb hit and five near-misses. The following day, the landing ship was once again bombed by Helldivers and Grumman TBF Avenger bombers from Lexington and USS Bunker Hill. Fatally damaged by four bombs, No. 1 broke in half and sank near 07°30′N 134°30′E. The ship was stricken from the navy list on 10 September 1944.
