= No.31-class patrol boat =

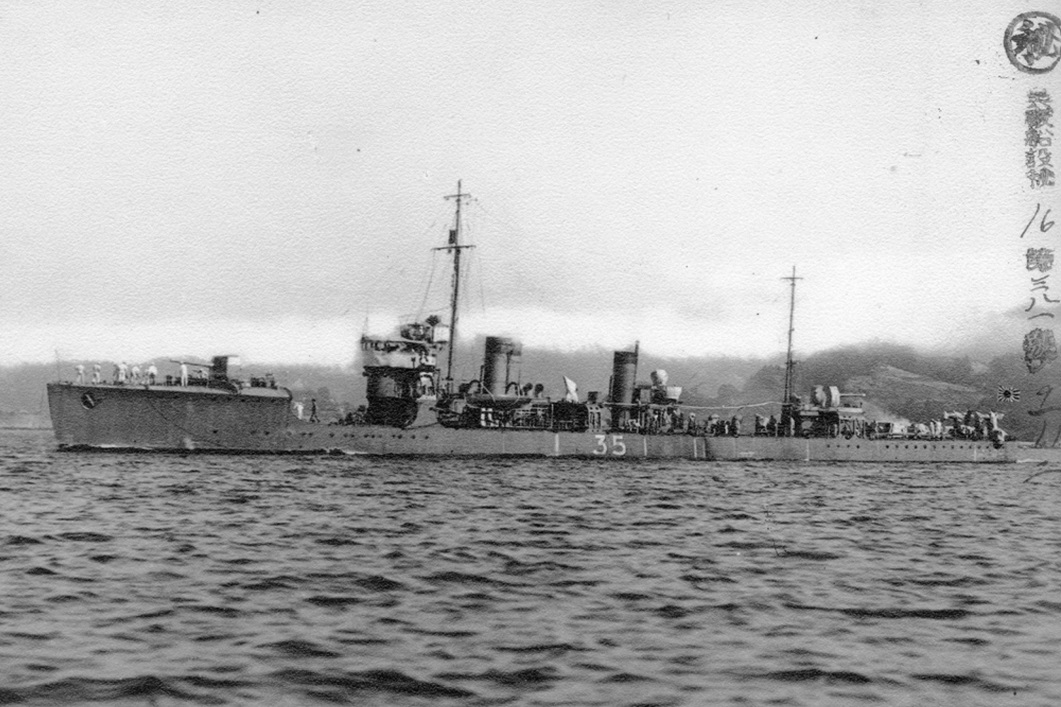
- No. 35 in 1940

Class overview
- Name: No. 31-class patrol boat
- Builders: Kure Naval Arsenal; Sasebo Naval Arsenal; Hakodate Dock Corporation
- Operators: Imperial Japanese Navy; People's Security Army Navy
- Succeeded by: Matsu-class destroyer; No.1-class landing ship
- Subclasses: No. 31 class (ex-Momi class); No. 46 class (ex-Wakatake class)
- Built: 1940
- In commission: 1940 – 1946
- Planned: 6
- Completed: 10
- Lost: 9
- Retired: 1

General characteristics No. 31 class
- Type: Patrol boat
- Displacement: 940 long tons (955 t) standard
- Length: April 1940; 88.39 m (290 ft 0 in) overall
- Beam: 7.93 m (26 ft 0 in)
- Propulsion: 2 × geared turbines; 2 × Kampon water tube boilers; 2 shafts, 4,000 shp
- Speed: 18.0 knots (20.7 mph; 33.3 km/h)
- Armament: April 1940; 2 × 120 mm (4.7 in) L/45 naval guns; 1 × Type 96 25 mm AA gun; 1 × paravane; No. 32 in 1941; 2 × 120 mm L/45 naval guns; 2 × Type 96 25 mm AA guns; 2 × depth charge throwers; 18 × depth charges; 1 × landing craft and one companie of Navy Landing Force, or 42 × depth charges

General characteristics No. 46
- Type: Patrol boat
- Displacement: 925 long tons (940 t) standard
- Length: 88.39 m (290 ft 0 in) overall
- Beam: 8.08 m (26 ft 6 in)
- Propulsion: 2 × Escher Wyss & Cie Zoelly geared turbines; 2 × Kampon water tube boilers; 2 shafts, 4,000 shp
- Speed: 18.0 knots (20.7 mph; 33.3 km/h)
- Armament: 2 × 120 mm L/45 naval guns

The No. 31-class patrol boats (第三十一号型哨戒艇,, Dai Sanjūichi Gō-gata Shōkaitei) were a class of patrol boats of the Imperial Japanese Navy (IJN), serving during World War II. 9 vessels were converted from Momi-class destroyers and 1 vessel was converted from a Wakatake-class destroyer in 1940. During WW2 all were lost except one.

== Background ==
In 1939, the IJN was liberated from London Naval Treaty, and they built many Kagerō-class destroyers. On the other hand, aging of the Momi-class destroyers was serious. Their boilers were degraded due to the operating conditions present in destroyers. Some Momi-class destroyers were not able to show 30 knots speed. The Navy General Staff made the Confidential Document No. 456. It was an order to rebuild them into patrol boats - about four Minekaze-class destroyers and six Momi-class destroyers. The IJN chose nine Momi class and one Wakatake class. Three Momis and one Wakatake were increased, because two Minekazes were decreased.

== Rebuilding ==
- Ten vessels were sent to dockyards for rebuilding. "Q" turret, all of torpedo tubes and one boiler were removed in 1940.
- In the second half of 1941, the IJN rebuilt them once again for war preparations. They were rebuilt to the landing craft carrier. The Y turret was moved to a place of the "Q" turret. Furthermore, a slope for Daihatsu-class landing craft was installed to their stern, and added deck house for one company of Navy Landing Force. As for the No. 31 and the No. 46, those rebuilt were not done.

== Service ==
- 10 and 23 December 1941: Sortie for the Battle of Wake Island. (No. 32 and No. 33) (both were lost in Battle of Wake Island)
- 12 December 1941: Sortie for the invasion of Legazpi. (No. 34, No. 35 and No. 36)
- 20 December 1941: Sortie for invasion of Davao. (No. 36 and No. 37)
- 25 December 1941: Sortie for invasion of Jolo. (No. 36 and No. 37)
- 11 January 1942: Sortie for the Battle of Tarakan. (No. 36, No. 37 and No. 38)
- 11 January 1942: Sortie for the Battle of Manado. (No. 34, No. 1 and No. 2)
- 31 January 1942: Sortie for the Battle of Ambon. (No. 34 and No. 39)
- 20 February 1942: Sortie for invasion of Kupang. (No. 39, No. 1 and No. 2)
- 1 March 1942: Sortie for invasion of Surabaya. (No. 34, No. 36, No. 37, No. 38 and No. 39)
- 31 March 1942: Sortie for the Battle of Christmas Island. (No. 34 and No. 36)
- (after): The IJN which finished First Phase Operations allotted them to the convoy escort operations. Only No. 36 was survived war.

No 36 was the only one to survive the WW2.

== Ships in classes ==
=== No. 31 class ===
Ship	Completed as destroyer	Rebuilt completed	Fate
Patrol Boat No. 31 ex-Kiku	10 December 1920	First quarter of 1940 at Kure Naval Arsenal. Renamed Patrol Boat No. 31 on 31 April 1940.	Sunk during the Operation Desecrate One at Palau on 30 March 1944; removed from naval ship list on 10 May 1944.
Patrol Boat No. 32 ex-Aoi	20 December 1920	First quarter of 1940 at Kure Naval Arsenal. Renamed Patrol Boat No. 32 on 1 April 1940.	Aground during the Battle of Wake Island on 23 December 1941, later scuttled; removed from naval ship list on 10 January 1942.
Patrol Boat No. 33 ex-Hagi	20 April 1921	First quarter of 1940 at Hakodate Dock. Renamed Patrol Boat No. 33 on 1 April 1940.	Aground during the Battle of Wake Island on 23 December 1941, later scuttled; removed from naval ship list on 10 January 1942.
Patrol Boat No. 34 ex-Susuki	25 May 1921	First quarter of 1940 at Kure Naval Arsenal. Renamed Patrol Boat No. 34 on 1 April 1940.	Collided with target ship Yakaze and sunk off Kavieng on 6 March 1943; removed from naval ship list on 10 January 1945.
Patrol Boat No. 35 ex-Tsuta	30 June 1921	First quarter of 1940 at Kure Naval Arsenal. Renamed Patrol Boat No. 35 on 1 April 1940.	Sunk by air raid off Lae on 2 September 1942; removed from naval ship list on 10 February 1943.
Patrol Boat No. 36 ex-Fuji	31 May 1921	First quarter of 1940 at Kure Naval Arsenal. Renamed Patrol Boat No. 36 on 1 April 1940.	Survived war at Surabaya. Seized by Indonesian People's Security Army in June 1946, recaptured by Royal Netherlands Navy in June 1946. Decommissioned on 10 August 1946; scrapped in 1947.
Patrol Boat No. 37 ex-Hishi	23 March 1922	First quarter of 1940 at Sasebo Naval Arsenal. Renamed Patrol Boat No. 37 on 1 April 1940.	Heavily damaged during the Battle of Balikpapan on 24 January 1942, later scuttled removed from naval ship list on 10 April 1942.
Patrol Boat No. 38 ex-Yomogi	19 August 1922	First quarter of 1940 at Sasebo Naval Arsenal. Renamed Patrol Boat No. 38 on 1 April 1940.	Sunk by USS Atule at Bashi Channel 20°12′N 121°51′E on 25 November 1944; removed from naval ship list on 10 March 1945.
Patrol Boat No. 39 ex-Tade	31 July 1922	First quarter of 1940 at Sasebo Naval Arsenal. Renamed Patrol Boat No. 39 on 1 April 1940.	Sunk by USS Seawolf off Yonaguni 23°45′N 122°45′E on 23 April 1943; removed from naval ship list on 1 July 1943.

=== No. 46 class ===
No. 40 to No. 45 were a space to the vessels numbers. These numbers were going to be given to all of Wakatakes.

Ship	Completed as destroyer	Rebuilt completed	Fate
Patrol Boat No. 46 ex-Yūgao	31 May 1924	First quarter of 1940 at Kure Naval Arsenal. Renamed Patrol Boat No. 46 on 1 April 1940.	Sunk by USS Greenling off Minamiizu 34°30′N 138°34′E on 10 November 1944; removed from naval ship list on 10 January 1945.

== Photos ==
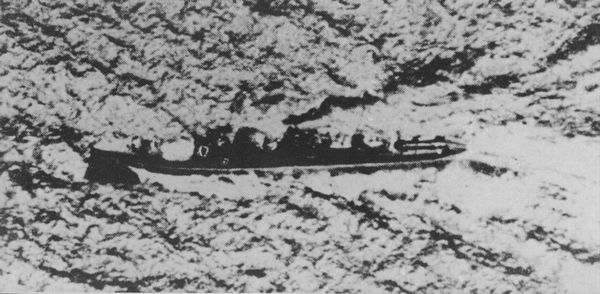
No. 31-class in September 1942

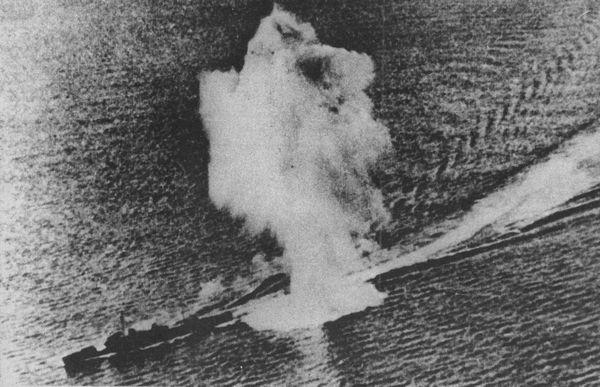
No. 31 on 30 March 1944 at Palau

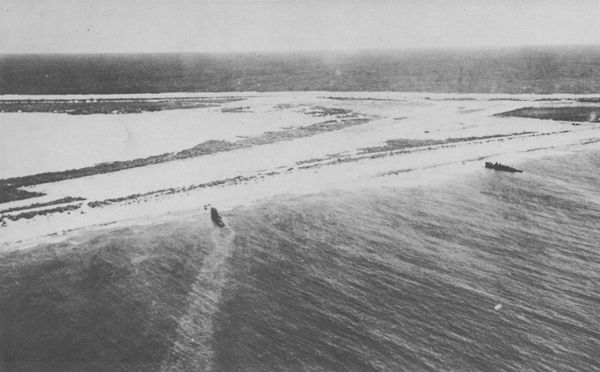
No. 32 and No. 33 at Wake Island (left to right)

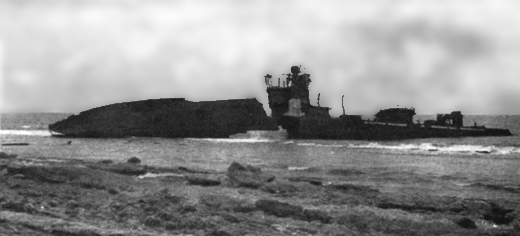
No. 33 at Wake Island

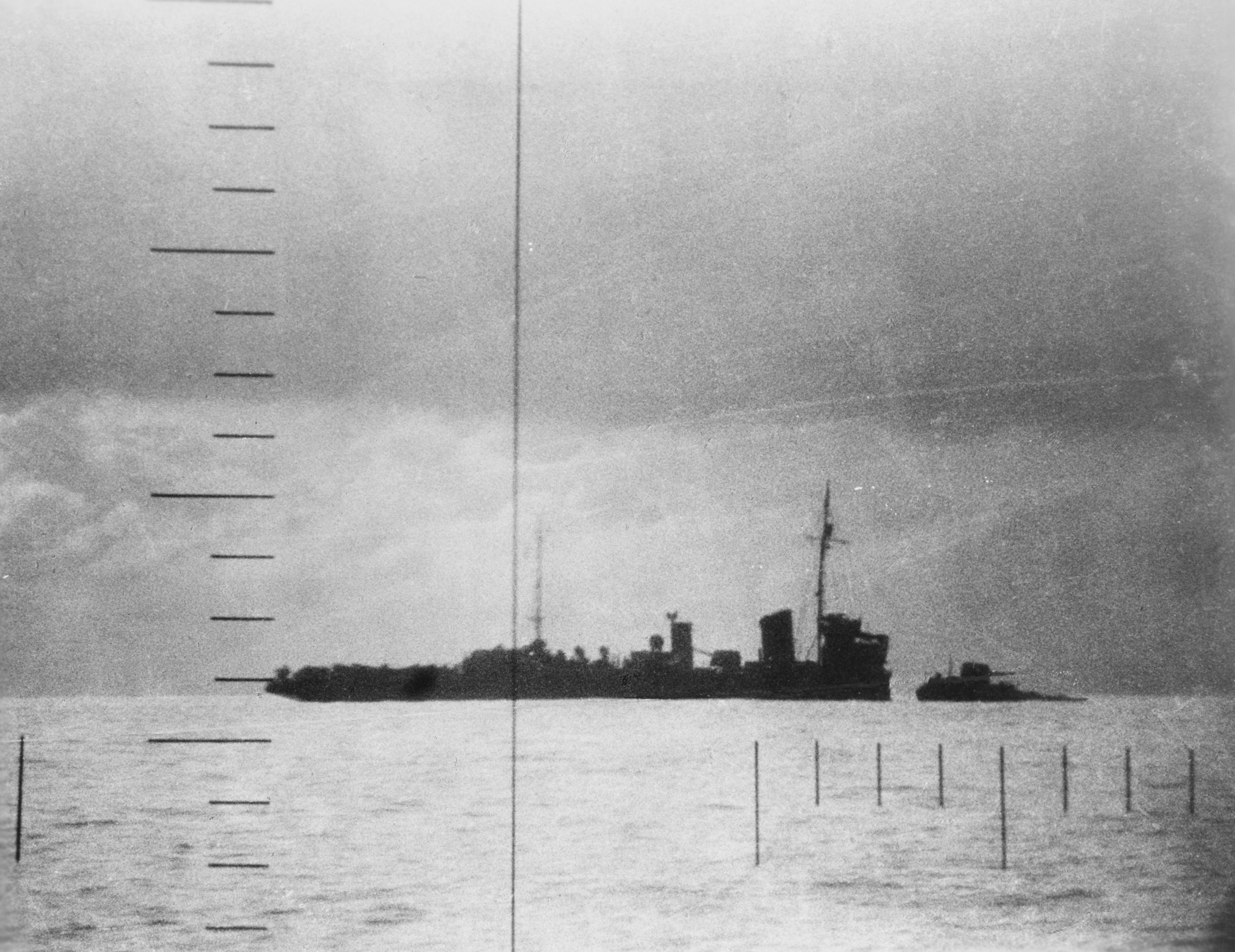
No. 39 on 23 April 1943

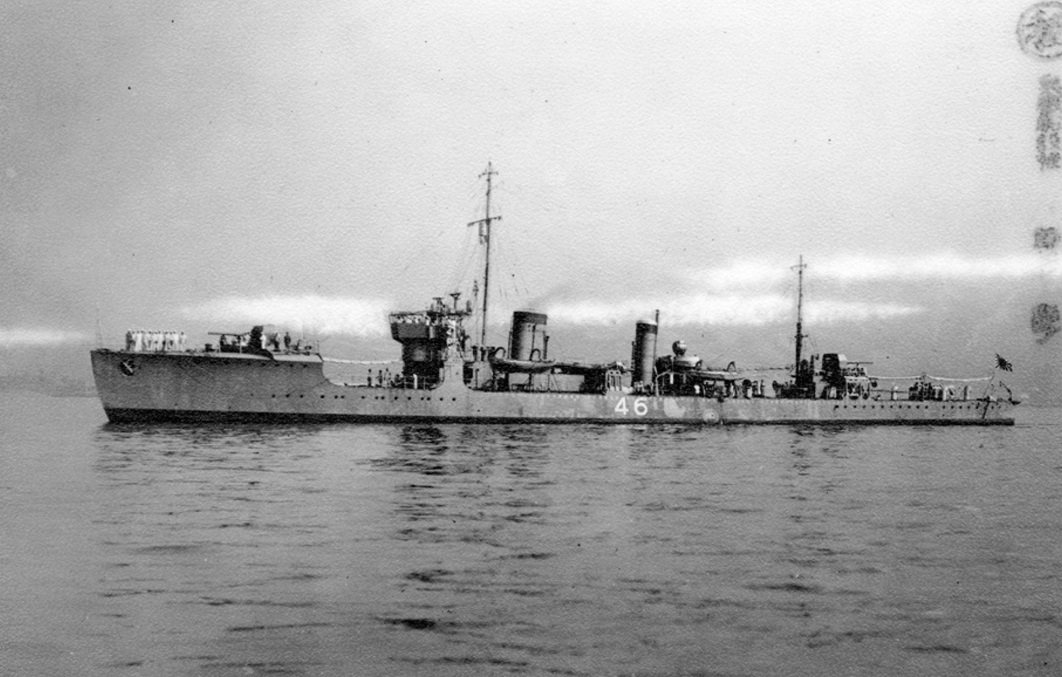
No. 46 in 1940 at Kure Naval Arsenal

== See also ==
- High speed transport
- No.1-class patrol boat
- No.1-class landing ship
- Momi-class destroyer
- Wakatake-class destroyer
- Battle of Wake Island

== Bibliography ==
- "Rekishi Gunzō"., History of Pacific War Vol.62 Ships of the Imperial Japanese Forces, Gakken (Japan), January 2008, ISBN 978-4-05-605008-0
- Ships of the World special issue Vol.45, Escort Vessels of the Imperial Japanese Navy, "Kaijinsha"., (Japan), February 1996
- The Maru Special, Japanese Naval Vessels No.49, Japanese submarine chasers and patrol boats, "Ushio Shobō". (Japan), March 1981
