= No.1-class landing ship =

World War II naval ship of Japan

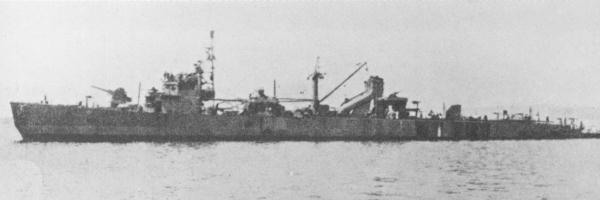
- Landing Ship No. 4 on 22 June 1944

Class overview
- Name: No.1-class landing ship
- Builders: Kure Naval Arsenal; Mitsubishi Heavy Industries
- Operators: Imperial Japanese Navy; Republic of China Navy
- Preceded by: No.1-class patrol boat
- Cost: 6,912,000 JPY as first ordered 22 vessels; 7,126,000 JPY as second ordered 12 vessels
- Built: 1943–1945
- In commission: 1944–1950
- Planned: 34
- Completed: 21
- Canceled: 13
- Lost: 16
- Retired: 5

General characteristics
- Type: Landing assault ship
- Displacement: 1,500 long tons (1,524 t) standard; 1,800 long tons (1,829 t) trial
- Length: 96.0 m (315 ft 0 in) overall; 94.0 m (308 ft 5 in) waterline
- Beam: 10.2 m (33 ft 6 in)
- Draught: 3.6 m (11 ft 10 in)
- Draft: 6.5 m (21 ft 4 in)
- Propulsion: 1 × Kampon geared turbine; 2 × Kampon water tube boilers; single shaft, 9,500 shp
- Speed: 22 knots (25 mph; 41 km/h)
- Range: 3,700 nmi (6,900 km) at 18 kn (21 mph; 33 km/h)
- Capacity: Example 1: 4 × Daihatsu and 260 tons freight; Example 2: 7 × Type 2 Ka-Mi; Example 3: 2 × Kō-hyōteki; Example 4: 6 × Kaiten or Kairyū
- Complement: 148
- Sensors & processing systems: as built; 1 × Type 22 radar; 1 × Type 93 hydrophone; 1 × Type 93 active sonar; later fitted; 1 × Type 13 radar
- Armament: Landing ship No.1 as built; 2 × 127 mm (5.0 in) L/40 AA guns; 15 × Type 96 25 mm AA guns; 18 × depth charges

The No.1-class landing ship (第一号型輸送艦, Dai 1 Gō-gata Yusōkan) was a class of amphibious assault ships of the Imperial Japanese Navy (IJN), serving during and after World War II. The IJN also called them 1st class transporter (一等輸送艦,, 1-Tō Yusōkan).

== Background ==
The IJN lost too many destroyers while employed as transporters ("Tokyo Express") in the Guadalcanal Campaign. Therefore, the IJN wanted a transporter which could penetrate the front line. It was realized rapidly after Operation Ke.

== Design ==
In April 1943, the General Staff requested a high-speed military transporter to the Technical Department. The requirements were as follows:

- Displacement: 1,250 long tons (1,270 t) standard
- Propulsion: 1 × geared turbine, 2 × boilers, single shaft
- Speed: 23 knots (26 mph; 43 km/h)
- Range: 3,500 nmi (6,500 km) at 18 kn (21 mph; 33 km/h)
- Capacity: 2 × Landing craft (Daihatsu) and 200 tons freight
- Armament: 2 × 127 mm (5.0 in) or 120 mm (4.7 in) AA guns, 9 × 25 mm AA guns and 36 × depth charges

The General Staff thought it was possible to use a variant of the Matsu-class destroyer for this plan, because they aimed to utilise mass production. In this original plan, the requirement for a slope was not considered. They thought about a Japanese version of the High speed transport (APD). The Technical Department, however, did not agree with this plan. They submitted a more aggressive plan to the General Staff. They increased the number of landing craft carried and with the effect of reducing the time for landing operations. In addition, about the mass production effect, they intended to deal with this by reducing the shipyards being used for production. At that time, the stern slope and operating ability of the amphibious tanks were added. In September 1943, the Kure Naval Arsenal finished the detailed design. Her project number was J37.

== Construction ==
The IJN nominated Kure Naval Arsenal as the main builder and Mitsubishi Heavy Industries as support builder.

Lead ship (Landing ship No.1) was constructed at Mitsubishi, laid down on 5 November 1943, launched on 8 February 1944, and completed on 10 May 1944. The Kure Naval Arsenal completed 15 vessels, Mitsubishi completed 6 vessels. The Kure Naval Arsenal was earnest. They made the original sized wooden samples, and learned a work procedure. They used the Yamato's dock and repeated build 2 vessels at the same time. Therefore, most of Kure's vessels were completed within 80 days from being laid down. The completed vessels were sent one by one to the front.

== Service ==
Their primary role was that of a transporter, however since their armaments were strong they were useful as multi-purpose ships at the front, functioning as transporters, as minelayers and as escort ships. Most of these vessels were sent to the Battle of Leyte and transportation duty of the Bonin Islands. By that time, the IJN already lost air superiority and thalassocracy (naval superiority) in those areas and these vessels suffered heavy losses. 5 vessels survived war and were surrendered to the Allies.

== Ships in class ==
Ship No.	Ship	Builder	Laid down	Launched	Completed	Fate
2901	No. 1	Mitsubishi, Yokohama Shipyard	5 November 1943	8 February 1944	10 May 1944	Sunk by aircraft at Palau on 29 June 1944.
2902	No. 2	Mitsubishi, Yokohama Shipyard	10 February 1944	6 May 1944	25 June 1944	Sunk by aircraft at Chichi-jima on 5 August 1944.
2903	No. 3	Kure Naval Arsenal	1 February 1944	20 March 1944	29 June 1944	Sunk by USS Guavina at Mindanao on 15 September 1944.
2904	No. 4	Kure Naval Arsenal	1 February 1944	20 March 1944	15 June 1944	Sunk by aircraft off Chichi-jima on 4 August 1944.
2905	No. 5	Kure Naval Arsenal	22 March 1944	25 May 1944	5 August 1944	Sunk by aircraft off Davao on 14 September 1944.
2906	No. 6	Kure Naval Arsenal	22 March 1944	25 May 1944	19 August 1944	Sunk by aircraft at Marinduque on 25 November 1944.
2907	No. 7	Mitsubishi, Yokohama Shipyard	1 April 1944	3 July 1944	15 September 1944	Sunk by USN destroyer at east of Iwo Jima on 27 December 1944.
2908	No. 8	Mitsubishi, Yokohama Shipyard	8 May 1944	11 August 1944	13 September 1944	Sunk by USS Case SSW of Chichi-jima on 24 December 1944.
2909	No. 9	Kure Naval Arsenal	28 May 1944	15 July 1944	20 September 1944	Survived war; decommissioned on 15 September 1945. Surrendered to United States 1947. Scrapped between 26 June 1948–1 October 1948.
2910	No. 10	Kure Naval Arsenal	28 May 1944	15 July 1944	25 September 1944	Sunk by aircraft at Marinduque on 25 November 1944.
2911	No. 11	Kure Naval Arsenal	18 July 1944	25 August 1944	5 November 1944	Heavy damaged by aircraft at Ormoc Bay on 7 December 1944; later sunk in shallow water.
2912	No. 12	Kure Naval Arsenal	18 July 1944	25 August 1944	11 November 1944	Sunk by USS Pintado at southeast of Kaohsiung on 12 December 1944.
2913	No. 13	Mitsubishi, Yokohama Shipyard	5 July 1944	30 September 1944	1 November 1944	Survived war; decommissioned on 20 November 1945. Surrendered to Soviet Union on 8 August 1947.
2914	No. 14	Kure Naval Arsenal	28 August 1944	24 October 1944	18 December 1944	Sunk by aircraft at near of Kaohsiung on 15 January 1945 during the South China Sea raid
2915	No. 15	Kure Naval Arsenal	28 August 1944	24 October 1944	20 December 1944	Sunk by USS Tautog north of Amami Ōshima on 17 January 1945.
2916	No. 16	Mitsubishi, Yokohama Shipyard	12 August 1944	10 October 1944	31 December 1944	Survived war; decommissioned on 15 September 1945. Surrendered to Republic of China at Qingdao on 29 August 1947; renamed Wu Yi. Decommissioned on 1 February 1950.
2917	No. 17	Kure Naval Arsenal	27 October 1944	30 December 1944	8 February 1945	Sunk by USN aircraft in the East China Sea on 2 April 1945.
2918	No. 18	Kure Naval Arsenal	27 October 1944	30 December 1944	12 February 1945	Sunk by USS Springer at near of Nago on 18 March 1945.
2919	No. 19	Kure Naval Arsenal	4 January 1945	24 February 1945	16 May 1945	Survived war; decommissioned on 15 October 1945. Surrendered to United Kingdom on 20 November 1947 at Uraga. Scrapped between October–December 1948.
2920	No. 20	Kure Naval Arsenal	4 January 1945	24 February 1945	23 April 1945	Survived war; decommissioned on 15 October 1945. Grounded at Penghu on 15 September 1946. Later scuttled.
2921	No. 21	Kure Naval Arsenal	27 February 1945	25 April 1945	15 July 1945	Sunk by aircraft at Kutsuna Islands on 10 August 1945.
2922	No. 22	Kure Naval Arsenal	27 February 1945	25 April 1945		80% complete; construction stopped on 23 June 1945. Scrapped in June 1948.
12 vessels						They were cancelled before being named.

== Photos ==
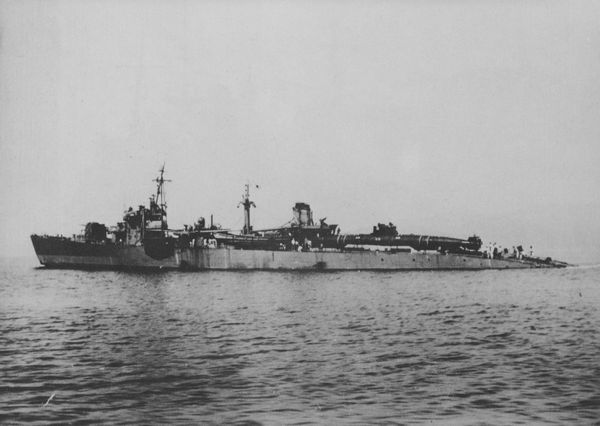
Landing Ship No. 5 w/ Kō-hyōteki No. 69 on 17 August 1944

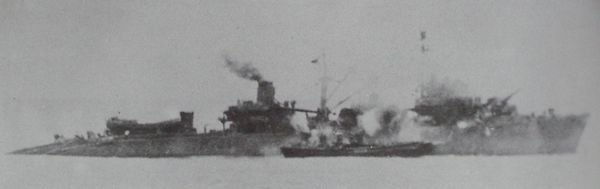
Landing Ship No. 1 class in action

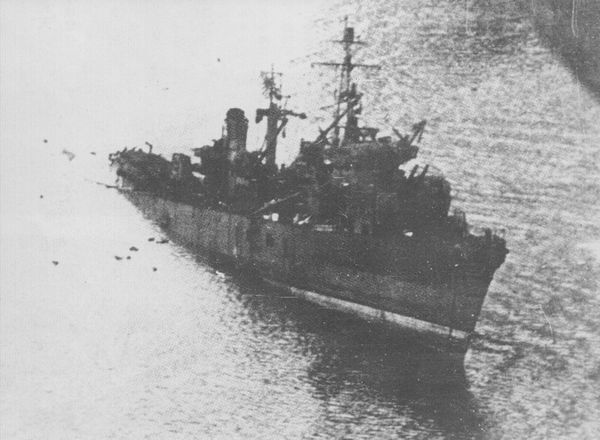
Landing Ship No. 11 at San Isidro

== See also ==
- High speed transport
- No.1-class patrol boat
- No.31-class patrol boat
- No.101-class landing ship

== Bibliography ==
- "Rekishi Gunzō"., History of Pacific War Vol.37, "Support vessels of the Imperial Japanese Forces", Gakken (Japan), June 2002, ISBN 4-05-602780-3
- Rekishi Gunzō, History of Pacific War Vol.51, "The truth histories of the Imperial Japanese Vessels Part.2", Gakken (Japan), August 2005, ISBN 4-05-604083-4
- The Maru Special, Japanese Naval Vessels No.50, "Japanese minesweepers and landing ships", Ushio Shobō (Japan), April 1981
- Ships of the World special issue Vol.47, Auxiliary Vessels of the Imperial Japanese Navy, "Kaijinsha"., (Japan), March 1997
- Senshi Sōsho Vol.88, Naval armaments and war preparation (2), "And after the outbreak of war", Asagumo Simbun (Japan), October 1975
- Shizuo Fukui, FUKUI SHIZUO COLLECTION "Japanese Naval Vessels 1869–1945", KK Bestsellers (Japan), December 1994
