= Sendai-class cruiser =

Warships in the Imperial Japanese Navy

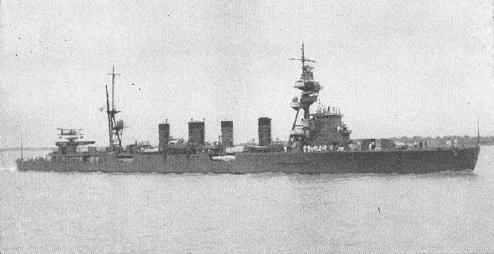
- Sendai, note the wider third funnel

Class overview
- Name: Sendai class
- Builders: Mitsubishi Shipbuilding, Nagasaki; Kawasaki Dockyard, Kobe; Yokohama Dock Company; Sasebo Naval Arsenal
- Operators: Imperial Japanese Navy
- Preceded by: Nagara class
- Succeeded by: Agano class
- Built: 1922-1925
- In commission: 1924-1944
- Planned: 8
- Completed: 3
- Canceled: 5
- Lost: 3

General characteristics
- Type: Light cruiser
- Displacement: 5,195 long tons (5,278 t) (standard); 5,595 long tons (5,685 t) (full load)
- Length: 158.53 m (520 ft 1 in) (waterline); 162.15 m (532 ft 0 in) o/a
- Beam: 14.17 m (46 ft 6 in)
- Draft: 4.8 m (15 ft 9 in)
- Depth: 8.85 m (29 ft 0 in)
- Installed power: 90,000 shp (67,000 kW); 154kW 110V electrical
- Propulsion: 4 × geared steam turbines (Brown-Curtiss in Jintsū, Parsons in Sendai and Naka); 12 × Kampon boilers (8 x oil-fed and 4 x coal-fed) (initial powerplant); 10 × Kampon oil-fed boilers (after 1934); 4 × shafts
- Speed: 35.25 kn (65.28 km/h; 40.56 mph)
- Range: 5,000 nmi (9,300 km; 5,800 mi) at 14 kn (26 km/h; 16 mph)
- Complement: 440
- Armament: Sendai, 1924: 7 × 140 mm (5.5 in)/50 guns; 2 × 8 cm/40 3rd Year Type naval gun (anti-aircraft guns); 8 × 610 mm (24 in) torpedo tubes (4x2); 16 × 610 mm (24 in) torpedoes; 56 × naval mines; Naka, Spring 1941: 7 × 140 mm (5.5 in) guns; 4 × Type 96 25 mm (0.98 in) anti-aircraft autocannons (2x2); 2 × 13.2 mm (0.52 in) anti-aircraft machine guns (2x1); 8 × 610 mm (24 in) torpedo tubes (4x2); 16 × 610 mm (24 in) torpedoes; some depth charges; Naka, March 1943: 6 × 140 mm (5.5 in) guns; 2 × 127 mm (5 in)/40 dual purpose guns (1x2); 10 × 25 mm (0.98 in) AAGs (2x3, 2x2); 2 × 13.2 mm (0.52 in) anti-aircraft machine guns (1x2); 8 × 610 mm (24 in) torpedo tubes (4x2); 16 × 610 mm (24 in) Type 93 torpedoes; some depth charges
- Armor: Deck: 2.9 cm (1.1 in); Belt: 6.4 cm (2.5 in)
- Aircraft carried: 1 × wheeled fighter; 1 × floatplane (1933)
- Aviation facilities: 1 × flying-off platform; 1 × catapult (1933)

The Sendai-class light cruisers (川内型軽巡洋艦, Sendai-gata keijun'yōkan) were a class of three warships operated by the Imperial Japanese Navy. The vessels in the class were named after rivers according to the navy's light cruiser naming rule. They participated in numerous actions during the Pacific War and were mainly used as destroyer flotilla leaders.

== Design ==
The Sendai-class light cruisers were a development of the preceding Nagara class. Their boilers were better located, and they had four funnels instead of three. Each ship was designed with a flying-off platform and hangar, but did not actually carry aircraft until a catapult system was installed in 1929.

The layout of the Sendai-class cruiser

== Ships in class ==
Eight additional 5,500-ton cruisers were planned to be built under the Eight-eight fleet Program. Four Sendai-class light cruisers were authorised to be constructed in Japan in 1921 and were laid down, but the last — Kako — was scrapped on the slipway in accordance with the regulations of the 1922 Washington Naval Treaty. The other three were sunk during World War II. Another four units were authorised to be built to the same design in 1922, but were cancelled following the signing of the Treaty after Japan decided that future cruiser construction would focus on heavy cruisers (the heavy cruisers Furutaka and Kako were built in place of two of the five cancelled Sendai Class cruisers).

Construction data
Ship	Kanji	Builder	Laid down	Launched	Completed	Fate
Sendai	川内	Mitsubishi Shipbuilding and Engineering Company, Nagasaki Yard	16 February 1922	30 October 1923	29 April 1924	Sunk during the Battle of Empress Augusta Bay, 2 November 1943
Jintsū	神通	Kawasaki Dockyard Company, Kobe Yard	4 August 1922	8 December 1923	31 July 1925	Sunk during the Battle of Kolombangara, 13 July 1943
Naka	那珂	Yokohama Dock Company	10 June 1922	24 March 1925	30 November 1925	Hull was burned by earthquake, later scrapped; Laid down once again, 24 May 1924; Sunk during Operation Hailstone, 17 February 1944
Kako	加古	Sasebo Naval Arsenal	15 February 1922	—	—	Discontinued by Washington Naval Treaty on 17 March 1922 and scrapped; naval budget was used for the Furutaka-class cruiser of the same name
Ayase	綾瀬	—	—	—	—	Cancelled and re-planned as Furutaka in March 1922
Minase	水無瀬	—	—	—	—	Cancelled following the Washington Naval Treaty
Otonase	音無瀬	—	—	—	—	Cancelled following the Washington Naval Treaty
(unnamed cruiser)	—	—	—	—	—	Cancelled following the Washington Naval Treaty

== Books ==
- Lacroix, Eric & Wells II, Linton (1997). Japanese Cruisers of the Pacific War. Annapolis, Maryland: Naval Institute Press. ISBN 0-87021-311-3.
- Model Art Ship Modelling Special No.29, 5,500 tons class cruisers, Model Art Co. Ltd. (Japan), September 2008, Book code 12319-09
- "Rekishi Gunzō"., History of Pacific War Vol.32 Light cruiser Kuma/Nagara/Sendai classes, Gakken (Japan), August 2001, ISBN 4-05-602582-7
- Daiji Katagiri, Ship Name Chronicles of the Imperial Japanese Navy Combined Fleet, Kōjinsha (Japan), June 1988, ISBN 4-7698-0386-9
- The Maru Special, Japanese Naval Vessels No.27 Sendai class cruisers, Ushio Shobō (Japan), May 1979, Book code 68343-27
