= No.1-class patrol boat =

World War II naval ship of Japan

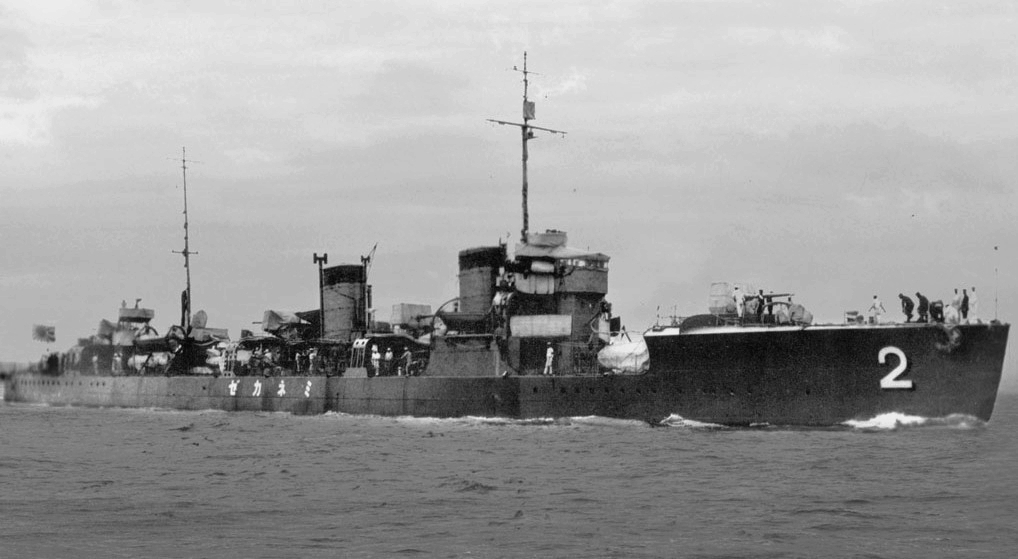
- Minekaze, the lead ship of the class of destroyer the patrol boats were converted from.

Class overview
- Name: No.1-class patrol boat
- Builders: Yokosuka Naval Arsenal
- Operators: Imperial Japanese Navy
- Succeeded by: Matsu-class destroyer; No.1-class landing ship
- Built: 1940
- In commission: 1940 – 1945
- Planned: 4
- Completed: 2
- Canceled: 2 (replaced by 4 × No.31-class patrol boats)
- Lost: 2

General characteristics
- Type: Patrol boat
- Displacement: 1,270 long tons (1,290 t) standard
- Length: April 1940; 102.57 m (336 ft 6 in) overall
- Beam: 8.92 m (29 ft 3 in)
- Propulsion: 2 × Mitsubishi-Parsons geared turbines; 2 × Kampon water tube boilers; 2 shafts, 10,000 shp
- Speed: 22.0 knots (25.3 mph; 40.7 km/h)
- Armament: April 1940; 3 × 120 mm (4.7 in) L/45 naval guns; 2 × 533 mm (21.0 in) torpedo tubes; 2 × 533 mm torpedoes; Late 1941; 2 × 120 mm (4.7 in) L/45 naval guns; 4 × Type 96 25 mm AA guns; 2 × depth charge throwers; 18 × depth charges; 2 × landing craft and 250 troops, or 42 × depth charges

The No. 1-class patrol boat (第一号型哨戒艇,, Dai Ichi Gō-gata Shōkaitei) was a class of patrol boats of the Imperial Japanese Navy (IJN), serving during World War II. 2 vessels were converted from Minekaze-class destroyers in 1940.

== Background ==
- In 1939, the IJN was liberated from London Naval Treaty, and they built many Kagerō-class destroyers. On the other hand, aging of the Minekaze-class destroyers was serious. Their boilers were worn down very much because they were destroyers. Some Minekazes were not able to show 30 knots speed. The Navy General Staff made Confidential Document No.456, an order to rebuild about four Minekaze-class destroyers and six Momi-class destroyers into patrol boats. The IJN chose Shimakaze and Nadakaze among the Minekaze class.

== Rebuilt ==
- Shimakaze and Nadakaze were sent to Yokosuka Naval Arsenal for rebuilding. B turret, four torpedo tubes, and two boilers were removed in 1940. In this point in time, they left a feature of the destroyer.
- Second half of 1941, the IJN rebuilt them once again for war preparations. They were rebuilt to the landing craft carrier. They were removed Y turret and torpedo tubes, and the enclosed well deck. Furthermore, a slope for Daihatsu-class landing craft was installed at the stern. Well-deck ruins were able to accommodate 250 troops (for two companies of Navy Landing Force).

== Service ==
- 8 December 1941: Sortie for invasion of Batanes Islands. (No.1 and No.2)
- 24 December 1941: Sortie for invasion of Lamon Bay. (No.1 and No.2)
- 11 January 1942: Sortie for Battle of Manado. (No.1, No.2 and No.34)
- 12 February 1942: Sortie for invasion of Makassar. (No.1 and No.2)
- 20 February 1942: Sortie for invasion of Kupang. (No.1, No.2 and No.39)
- (after): The IJN which finished First Phase Operations allotted them to the convoy escort operations and No.1 and No.2 were sunk by Allied submarines.

== Ships in class ==
Ship	Completed as destroyer	Rebuilt completed	Fate
Patrol Boat No. 1 ex-Shimakaze	15 November 1920	First quarter of 1940 at Yokosuka Naval Arsenal. Renamed Patrol Boat No. 1 on 1 April 1940.	Sunk by USS Guardfish at west off Kavieng 02°51′S 149°43′E on 12 January 1943. Decommissioned on 10 February 1943.
Patrol Boat No. 2 ex-Nadakaze	30 September 1921	First quarter of 1940 at Yokosuka Naval Arsenal. Renamed Patrol Boat No. 2 on 1 April 1940.	Sunk by HMS Stubborn at Lombok Strait 07°07′S 115°40′E on 25 July 1945. Decommissioned on 30 September 1945.

== See also ==
- High speed transport
- No.31-class patrol boat
- No.1-class landing ship
- Minekaze-class destroyer

== Bibliography ==
- "Rekishi Gunzō"., History of Pacific War Vol.62, "Ships of the Imperial Japanese Forces", Gakken (Japan), January 2008, ISBN 978-4-05-605008-0
- Monthly Ships of the World, Special issue Vol.45, "Escort Vessels of the Imperial Japanese Navy", "Kaijinsha"., (Japan), February 1996
- The Maru Special, Japanese Naval Vessels No.49, "Japanese submarine chasers and patrol boats", "Ushio Shobō". (Japan), March 1981
