= Battle of Tarakan (1942) =

1942 battle involving Japanese Empire and Dutch Empire

- Part of World War II, Pacific War, Dutch East Indies campaign
Date	11–12 January 1942
Location	Tarakan Island, Dutch East Indies
Result	Japanese victory

Belligerents
Netherlands	Japan

Commanders and leaders
(Netherlands) Simon de Waal (surrendered) (Netherlands) Anthonie van Versendaal †	(Empire of Japan) Shizuo Sakaguchi (Empire of Japan) Shoji Nishimura

Strength
1,365	6,600

Casualties and losses
300 killed 40 wounded 871 captured (of which 215 executed); 1 minelayer sunk	255 killed 38 wounded 2 minesweepers sunk

The Battle of Tarakan took place on 11–12 January 1942, a day after the Empire of Japan declared war on the Kingdom of the Netherlands. Although Tarakan was only a small marshy island off northeastern Borneo in the Netherlands East Indies (today's Indonesia), its 700 oil wells, refineries, and airfield made it a crucial objective for Japan in the Pacific War.

== Background ==
=== Prewar oil discovery and production ===
Located at a remote edge in the Dutch colony of Netherlands East Indies and only 25 sq. miles in diameter, the discovery of oil at a relatively low depth below the ground (50 to 300 meters) brought great significance to Tarakan.

Pamoesian (Pamusian) on the western side of the island became the main drilling site before the war, where about 700 oil wells were established by the Bataafse Petroleum Maatschappij (BPM; "Batavian Petroleum Company"). In the vicinity of the drilling sites, housing centers for BPM European employees and Chinese residents was established. Further up north, BPM also established another drilling site at Djoeata (Juwata). To all intents and purposes, the oil wells became the source of living for the island's population.

Despite the prevalence of this massive production, before the war, most of Tarakan's hilly terrain at the center of the island, as well as the swamp coastlines in the east remained at their natural state. The road network was limited to connecting the Pamoesian and Djoeata drilling sites, the port facilities at Lingkas on the west and the airfield nearby with a 1,500 m runway.

=== Dutch began establishing defenses ===
As oil production began to grow, the Dutch began to contemplate the possibility of a Japanese military aggression, and with it, the need to protect the island's facilities.

In 1923, an infantry company was established in Tarakan to serve as a covering force during the destruction of oil refineries and other production installations in the event of an unforeseen attack. Increasing international tensions compelled the company to be strengthened into a battalion-sized force.

In 1930, the Committee on the Defense of Oil Ports was established, with the purpose of analyzing the defense of major oil ports in the Dutch East Indies. Naturally, the Commission concluded that a permanent occupation of Tarakan by a larger than company-sized force was an absolute necessity.

In 1933, a so-called "Reinforcement Detachment" from Java arrived to bolster Tarakan's defense, as tensions in the Pacific were brewing up at the time. After 4 months, the detachment was sent back and it was not until 1934 before a full battalion with auxiliary weapons came to defend Tarakan.

=== Japan's need for resources ===
Before the Second World War, Tarakan produced around 6 million barrels of oil annually, an amount which accounts to 16% of the total Japanese annual oil consumption. This made the island one of the key goals of Japanese military (esp. the Imperial Japanese Navy) in their plans to occupy the Netherlands East Indies in the years leading up to the war.

== Order of battle ==
=== Japan ===
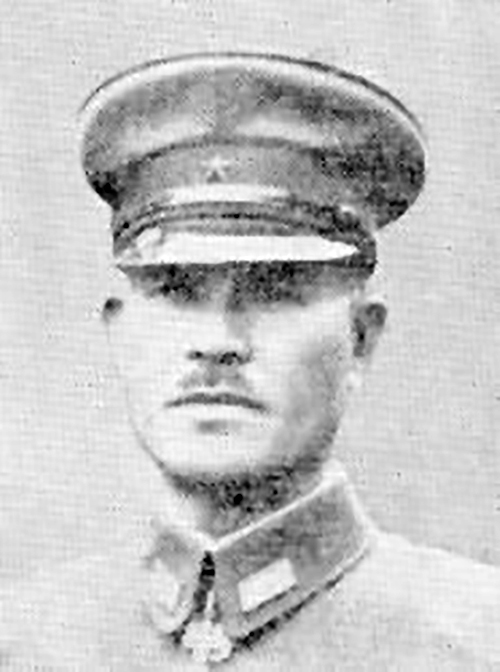
Major General Shizuo Sakaguchi

==== Ground forces ====
Sakaguchi Detachment (Commander: Maj. Gen. Shizuo Sakaguchi)
Right Wing Unit (Commander: Col. Kyōhei Yamamoto)	Left Wing Unit (Commander Col. Ken’ichi Kanauji)	Other units
146th Infantry Regiment (minus 2nd and 3rd battalion); One artillery and antitank gun battery; 2nd Kure Special Landing Force (one battalion); 1st Engineer Company (minus one platoon); Medical Unit (minus half of the unit); Radio Unit	2nd Infantry Battalion (min. 6th Company); One artillery and antitank gun battery; One engineer platoon; Radio Unit	56th Regiment Headquarters; 56th Regiment Armored Car Unit; 1st Field Artillery Battalion; 44th Field Anti Aircraft Artillery Battalion

==== Naval forces ====
Western Attack Unit (Commander: Rear. Adm. Shoji Nishimura, based in the cruiser Naka)
4th Destroyer Flotilla (Commander: Rear. Adm. Shoji Nishimura)	Air Group (Commander: Capt. Takamasa Fujisawa)	Base Force (Commander: Rear. Adm. Sueto Hirose, based on the minelayer Itsukushima)
2nd Destroyer Division; (Harusame, Samidare, Yudachi): 9th Destroyer Division; (Asagumo, Minegumo, Natsugumo): 24th Destroyer Division; (Umikaze, Kawakaze, Yamakaze, Suzukaze): Transport Unit; 1st Echelon: Tsuruga Maru, Liverpool Maru, Hiteru Maru, Hankow Maru, Ehime Maru, Kunikawa Maru, Kano Maru; 2nd Echelon: Havana Maru, Teiryū Maru, Kuretake Maru, Nichiai Maru, Kagu Maru, Kunitsu Maru, and Rakuto Maru	Seaplane tenders Sanyo Maru and Sanuki Maru; One oiler	2nd Base Force; (P-36, P-37 and P-38): 11th Minesweeper Division; (W-13, W-14, W-15, W-16): 30th Minesweeper Division; (W-17, W-18): 31st Submarine-chaser Division; (CH-10, CH-11, CH-12)

=== Netherlands ===
==== Ground forces ====
Tarakan Garrison (7th KNIL Infantry Battalion, Commander: Lt. Col. Simon de Waal):
Infantry (Commander: Lt. Col. Simon de Waal)	Artillery (Commander: M.J. Bakker)	Other units
3 Company of 177 man with 18 machine guns each; (Commander: F. Treffers, A.C. Saraber and L. Bendeler): 1 Machine Gun Company of 18-24 Vickers Machine Gun and 6 80mm mortar (Commander: Capt. W. Everaar); 1 Motorized detachment of 80 man and 7 overvalwagen armored cars (Commander: 1st Lt. D.P. de Vos tot Nederveen Cappel)	Three coastal artillery batteries: 3 x 75 mm guns near Peningki under 1st Lt. J.W. Storm; 4 x 120 mm guns at Karoengan under 1st Lt. J.P.A. van Adrichem; 4 x 75 mm guns under Reserve 1st Lt. Van der Zijde; Two artillery (non-mobile) batteries: 3 x 75 mm guns near Lingkas under Reserve 1st Lt. J. Verdam; 2 x 70 mm guns (aged) manned by KNIL personnel in the Lingkas area; Two Anti-Aircraft batteries under Reserve Lt. Nijenhuis: 4 × 40 mm guns; 4 × 20 mm guns; Four AA machine gun platoons; (10 - 12 x 12.7 mm heavy machine guns)	Two engineer platoons (a platoon of 30 man and another of 40 conscripted BPM employees) under 1st. Lt. J.W. van den Belt; Mobile Auxiliary First Aid Platoon

==== Aerial and Naval forces ====
304th Militaire Luchtvaart (ML-KNIL)	Koninklijke Marine
3 x Glenn Martin B-10 (Transferred to Samarinda II Airfield in December 1941; Tarakan Airfield deemed too small for two-engined bombers); 4 x Brewster Buffalo under 1st. Lt. P.A.C. Benjamins	Minelayer Hr. Ms. Prins van Oranje; (Commander: Lt. Anthonie C. van Versendaal): 2 x Patrol boats; 3 x Dornier Do-24K; A light ship of the Government Navy

== Dutch plans ==
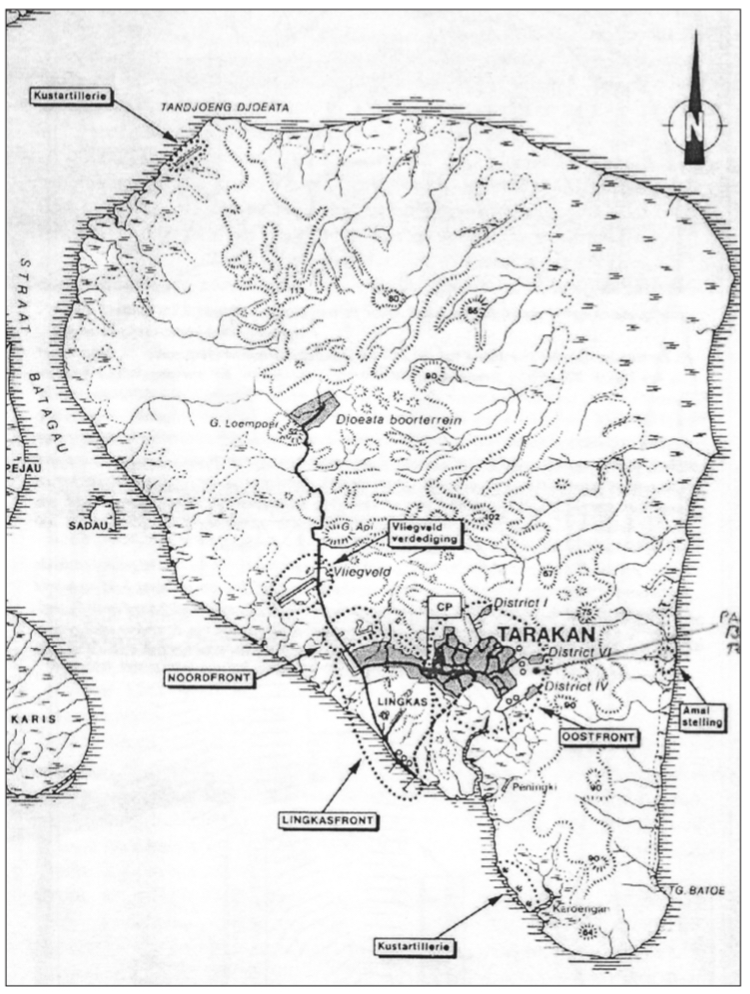
Dutch defensive positions on Tarakan, 1942

Early Dutch plans before 1941 called for the defense of the oil fields and installations at all costs. If deemed impossible, Dutch forces were to deny the enemy the usage of Tarakan's oil-producing machinery, before withdrawing to mainland Borneo.

One major hindrance in the defense of Tarakan was the unsuitability of its airfield to accommodate both fighters and bombers. However, the plan also called for a persistent defense of the airfield, a task that, considering the airfield's size and the Japanese military strength — in particular the overall sea and air balance; — would bring limited results.

The deployment of the Tarakan Garrison was orchestrated to prevent enemy occupation of the port complex on the western part of the island. Defense positions consisted of several "fronts" of double fence barriers:

- Lingkas Front, defending the port complex
- North Front (NoordFront), defending access point to the airfield
- Support points in and around Tarakan Airfield
- Eastern Front (OostFront), defending the Pamoesian oil field (this front had no direct connection to the North Front; special units guard the gap between both fronts)

On the East Coast, Dutch troops prepared a platoon-strength support point at the mouth of the Amal River. This unit was intended to impede the enemy landing for a brief moment, before retreating to the Eastern Front. Additional infantry cover forces were established at the Djoeata, Peningki and Karoengan batteries.

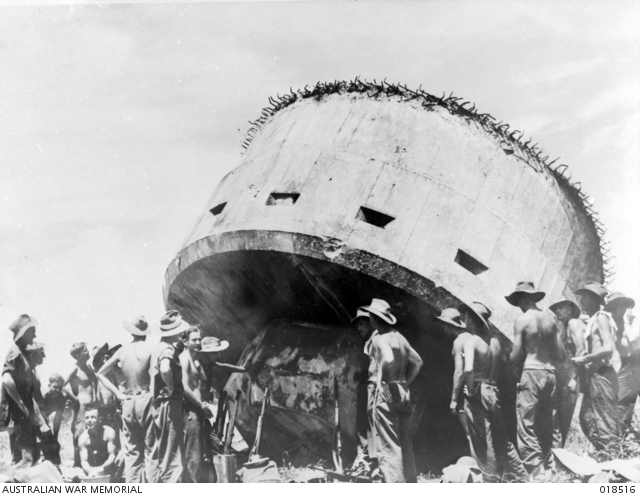
Dutch pillboxes. Captured by the Japanese in January 1942, this pillbox was blown up by a bomb blast in the Battle of Tarakan in May 1945.

The support points, on which the front is established, were occupied with 25 troops, supported by two light and two medium machine guns each. Housed in concrete pillboxes, each support point was surrounded by a double fence, yet the scarce manpower made it impossible to occupy all support points at the same time.

The coastal batteries monitored the minefields and the entrances to the harbor. Artillery in the Lingkas Front could also be utilized to support inland battles.

Initially, the airport was only defended with 20 mm anti-aircraft guns and machine guns. Abandoned before the Japanese landing, two sections of 40 mm anti-aircraft gun (minus one gun) stood at the airfield; the 20 mm guns were relocated to defend the Peningki and Karoengan batteries.

The Dutch Navy (Koninklijke Marine) laid extensive minefields at the approaches to the port. In the event of an attack, any sea lanes that were still open would be blocked by the minelayer Hr. Ms. Prins van Oranje.

Despite all of these preparations, in the aftermath of the Pearl Harbor attack, a certain defeatist atmosphere had already enveloped the defenders even well before any signs of invasion.

== Japanese plans ==
For the capture of Tarakan, the Japanese planned for a two pronged landing from the eastern side of the Island. One prong of the advance, the Right Wing Unit (under Col. Yamamoto), would land at the shores near the Amal River and destroy any Dutch troops there. Without waiting for the landing to be completed, the unit would then move westwards through the jungle and launch a sudden attack to seize the Pamoesian oilfields. Upon securing Pamoesian, Yamamoto's troops would then advance to secure the installations at the Lingkas port before the Dutch could demolish it.

The second prong, the Left Wing Unit, would land further south at Tandjoeng Batoe (Tanjung Batu) and make their way west to capture the Peningki-Karoengan gun batteries, before moving to Lingkas, passing by the 2nd Kure Special Landing Force at the airfield, to attack and capture the Gunung Cangkol and Djoeata oil fields and the Djoeata battery up north. Once these key points of Tarakan Island were cleared, the Army would turn over guard duty to the Navy, and the force would be assembled in Tarakan and its vicinity to prepare for the capture of Balikpapan.

== Battle ==
On 10 January 1942, after an MLD Dornier Do 24 spotted the approaching Japanese invasion fleet, Lt. Col. Simon de Waal ordered the destruction of all oil installations on the island. The engineer platoons dynamited the drilling pipes, causing an underground explosion that prevented the wells and oil below from being extracted in the near future. By 10:00 P.M., 100,000 tons worth of oil had been engulfed in flames.

At 03:00 A.M. on 11 January, Sergeant-Major C.P.E. Spangenberg, commanding the Amal River support point (with 53 troops) reported sighting landing vessels nearing the coast. At that point, the Right Wing Unit of the Japanese invasion force began to land on the eastern parts of Tarakan under the silhouette of the blazing oil fields.

Since Dutch forces had arranged their dispositions to defend attacks from a westerly direction, they were still uncertain that the enemy forces that had been concentrating on the eastern parts of the island constituted the main attacking force. Diversionary landings and maneuvers were still being considered, even as another Japanese landing force had already been sighted at 05:00 A.M. by the defending force at Tandjoeng Batoe, further south of the Amal River.

=== Right Wing Unit ===
Col. Yamamoto's Right Wing Unit, having mistaken the fires at the Gunung Cangkol oil field for that of the Lingkas oil field to the south, landed four to six km further north of their intended landing point, the mouth of the Amal River. Spangenberg's forces also mistook the Japanese landing vessels, which were circling around at the time, and making a direct landing attempt and ordered his forces to open fire at them.

Reaching the Amal river by 05:00, the unit attacked and outflanked Spangenberg's pillboxes located there, defeating his troops. With 25-30 of his troops that were left, Spangenberg withdrew to a new support point near the Pamoesian River. As fires from the oil fields rendered many support points useless, Spangenberg's had become the main point of defense on the Eastern Front. Under the overall command of Capt. Saraber, the point became a rallying base for retreating troops, enabling the Dutch to restore the front line.

To support this line, the Dutch constructed a second front line behind Saraber's. Consisting of around 650 men, the line was supported by Everaars' Javanese machine gun company, Treffers's Ambonese soldiers and several of overvalwagens. Everaar's troops, however, had not received proper training; many of their machine guns malfunctioned and the company had virtually little to no ammunition.

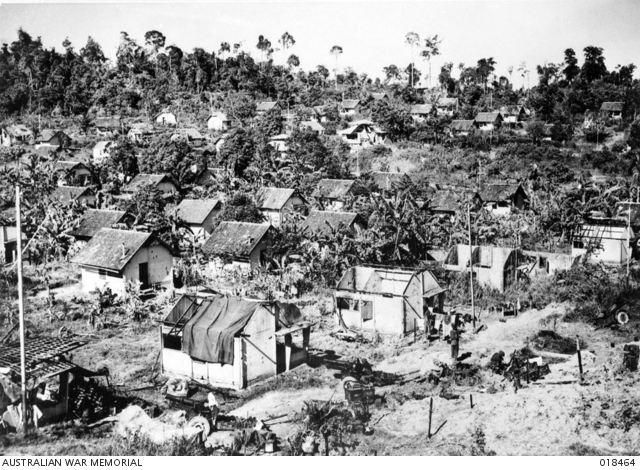
Dutch barracks at Lingkas (Tarakan). Captured by the Japanese in 1942, it was recaptured by the Australians in May 1945.

Meanwhile, from information obtained through interrogating captured soldiers, the Right Wing Unit now advanced to the north side of the Tarakan oil field. As they approached the oil fields, the unit's advance was bogged down from artillery and mortar fire from Saraber's support point. The Dutch attempted their own offensive, supported by artillery and led by Treffers's company in their first baptism of fire. The attack did not succeed, and Treffers could not advance beyond the second front line.

Frustrated by the Dutch resistance, Gen. Sakaguchi requested air strike support on the batteries of Djoeata up north and on Sadau Island at the far west of Tarakan, in addition to Tarakan city itself for the following day. As night fell, both sides attempted to launch simultaneous counterattacks. de Waal planned for the Dutch's last offensive attempt at 05:15. the next day with all of his available personnel (incl. engineers, ammunition staff, clerks and chefs).

The Japanese, however, took the first initiative. Launching a series of night raids at the same time, Yamamoto's troops managed to capture both lines of Dutch barracks. In the midst of the chaos, the Japanese killed many Dutch troops, including Bakker and van den Belt. Treffers was also killed, as his company made a retreat towards the headquarter. Despite this, the Right Wing Unit failed to capture the Dutch headquarter.

With supplies dwindling, the number of troops thinning out and communications with the coastal batteries breaking down, the Dutch finally decided to capitulate. At 07:30 on the 12th, de Waal dispatched a bearer of a flag of truce to announce the surrender. Colonel Yamamoto immediately sent a wire to Detachment Commander Sakaguchi, stating: “The [Dutch] commander and his men have announced surrender at 08:20. Therefore, the prompt landing of the detachment commander by way of the Lingkas Pier is requested.”

=== Left Wing Unit ===
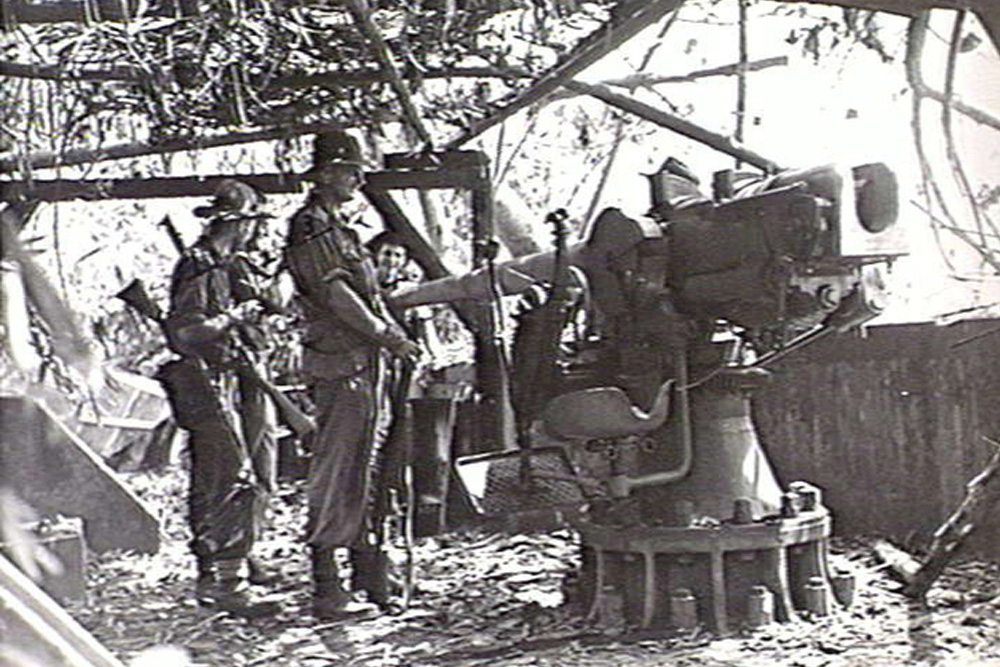
Dutch coastal battery at Peningki. Captured by the Japanese in 1942, it was recaptured by the Australians in May 1945.

Maj. Kanauji's Left Wing Unit landed near Tandjoeng Batoe at 04:00 on the 11th, but by 17:00 on the same day, its whereabouts were still virtually unknown to the invasion force. At that point, having landed, Ken'ichi's force tried to advance directly through the jungle towards the rear of the Karoengan battery. However, due to the dense vegetation and steep jungle terrain, the unit could only advance by about 100 meters per hour, while under disorientation about their surroundings.

Meanwhile, as it became evident that the Japanese are attacking from the east, de Waal relocated some of his forces to protect the Kaorengan and Peningki batteries. On the night of 11 January, Capt. Bendeler's company of 65 men left Tarakan City, having been assigned to take a position in the vicinity of Tandjoeng Batoe and to guard the paths leading to the batteries. Hindered by darkness, the company found itself lost in the forest, before running into the Left Wing Unit. Without exchanging a shot, Bendeler and half of his unit were captured, while the other half was promptly executed. When captured members of his unit refused to guide the Left Wing Unit through the forest, they were tied together in groups and bayoneted at dawn. Bendeler and some of his officers were spared.

By noon on the 12th, Kanauji had just managed to reach the rear of the battery. Yet since he was unable to establish any contact, just before midnight on the 11th, Sakaguchi ordered an infantry company under Lt. Col. Namekata to go ashore at the Left Wing Unit landing point and advance along the coast to seize the battery. Even though the unit managed to reached the front of the battery, rough terrain also blocked their progress.

Even after the Dutch surrender, the breakdown of communication means that the coastal batteries of Karoengan and Peningki were still operating at the time. Advising caution, Sakaguchi sent a message to the Navy: "Although the enemy has offered to surrender, it is feared that the battery at the south end of the island is not aware of this and it would be dangerous to proceed to the Tarakan Pier, therefore, hold up your sailing."

=== Sinking of Minesweepers W-13 & W-14 ===
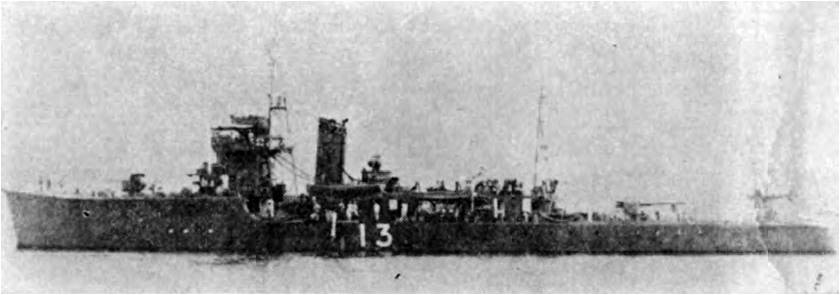
Minesweeper W-13

Ignoring Sakaguchi's warning, at 12:00, six minesweepers of the 11th and 30th Minesweeper Division promptly set out and approached the Mengacu Channel to sweep the port area for mines. As soon as Minesweeper W-13 changed its course toward Lingkas, the Karoengan batteries opened fire from a distance of about 2 km. By the time they fired the third salvo, W-13 had received a direct hit at midships near the waterline; W-14 now began to fire back and both ships increase their speed heading towards Lingkas.

After the second hit, W-13 received another hit near the bridge and began to turn towards the port. The ship took evasive action to avoid the gunfire, before stopping for a moment. As W-13 tried to head back, its rudder had seemed to be out of order, directing it continuously to the port in the direction of Lingkas. When W-13 began to take evasive action, the Dutch turned their artilleries on W-14. Immediately, the minesweeper received continuous hits at the bridge, midships and stern. Before long, a shell managed to hit the ship's depth charges, causing a massive explosion that tore W-14 near the mizzenmast, while another blew off one of the ship's 120 mm guns.

Despite the damage, W-14 now turned and steamed at full speed towards the Karoengan battery, its one gun still firing. As it came near Cape Mengacu, a column of water was thrown up at the waterline, indicating that the minesweeper might have hit a mine. At 12:05, W-14 finally sank, bow first, near the shores at Cape Mengacu. Soon, the Karoengan battery immediately re-focused their fire on W-13, which still seemed to be heading to Lingkas. As the minesweeper began to slow down, Dutch fire began to become more accurate; shells hit the ship's bridge, destroyed one of its guns and caused massive fires aboard. W-13 eventually listed to port and began to go down from the bow, before finally sinking at 12:15.

In addition to the two minesweepers, the Karoengan battery also sank a Japanese landing craft. Since mines had been laid in the narrow waters of the engagement site, other Japanese ships could not swiftly rescue the survivors. Commander of the 11th Minesweeper Division, Cdr. Wakito Yamakuma was killed along with 156 others, while 53 sailors from both ships survived. The remaining four minesweepers withdrew under order. Kanauji's troops, hindered by poor communication and cumbered advance, had only managed to seize the Karoengan battery at 17:10 on 13 January, a day after de Waal surrendered.

=== Sinking of Minelayer Hr. Ms. Prins van Oranje ===
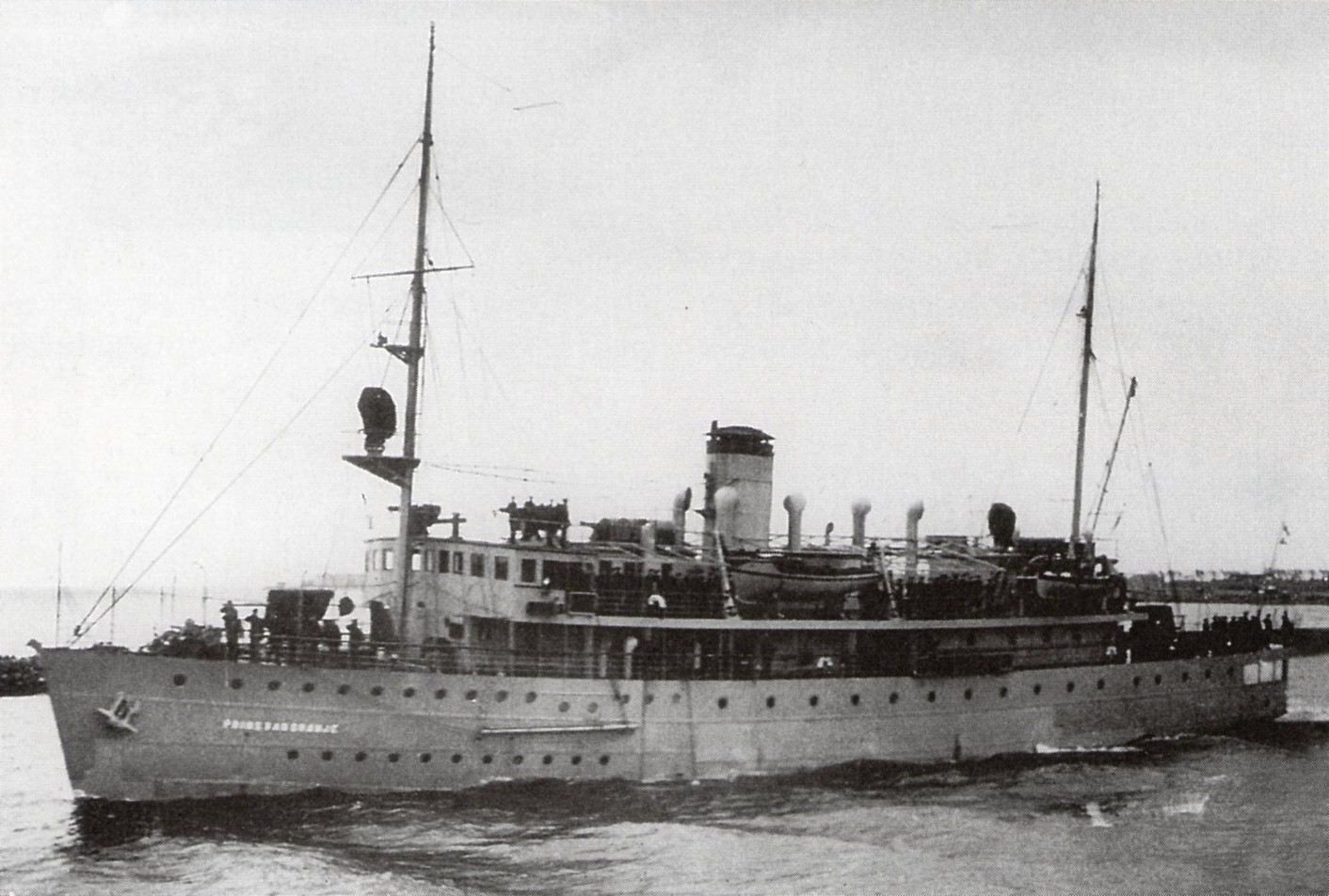
Hr. Ms. Prins Van Oranje in 1932. Its skipper at the time was Lieutenant-Commander Karel Doorman, future ABDA naval commander at the Battle of the Java Sea.

On the night of 11 January, before Japan completed the blockade of Tarakan, the Dutch submarine K-X, the patrol boat P 1, and BPM motor schooner Aida slipped into friendly waters. The P-1, hidden under palm branches, reached the Borneo shore and successfully navigated a series of waterways upriver to Samarinda.

The Dutch minelayer Hr. Ms. Prins van Oranje tried to escape eastward. However, at 21:57, the Japanese destroyer Yamakaze, under Lt. Cdr. Shuichi Hamanaka, and the patrol boat P-38 who were patrolling the waterway northeast of Tarakan spotted Prins van Oranje's silhouette and secretly followed it eastwards into wider waters.

At 23:18, Yamakaze increased its speed to 26 knots and began to close in on the Dutch minelayer. By 23:22, both ships began to open fire on each other at an average range of 1,800 meters, but the engagement turned one-sided immediately. Every salvo of Yamakaze's guns scored hits on Prins van Oranje, with the latter's salvos passing over the destroyer.

In just 10 minutes, the Prins van Oranje sank, taking down 102 of the 118 crew members aboard with it. The ship's skipper, Anthonie van Versendaal and three other officers were among those killed in the battle, while Yamakaze picked up 16 survivors and put them ashore in Tarakan. Lieutenant-Commander van Versendaal was posthumously decorated with the Bronze Lion, Netherlands' second highest military decoration.

=== Air battle over Tarakan ===
Throughout the battle, the Dutch (ML-KNIL) conducted numerous airstrikes from Samarinda II Airfield to stem the Japanese attack. Notwithstanding, due to bad weather, particularly on 11 January, their efforts came too late for the Tarakan defenders below. The results of these strikes are summarized below:

Date	Units deployed	Result	Losses
10 January 1942	6 Glenn Martin B-10; 2 Brewster Buffalo	None; A Mitsubishi F1M shot down by the Brewsters	One Glenn Martin
11 January 1942	3 Glenn Martin B-10; 7 B-17 Flying Fortress	None because of bad weather A Mitsubishi Zero shot down by a B-17	None
12 January 1942	12 Glenn Martin B-10 (Three returned en route)	Two transport ships and a destroyer damaged Two Mitsubishi F1M shot down	One Glenn Martin
13 January 1942	15 Glenn Martin B-10 (One returned en route; One recalled)	A light cruiser or destroyer damaged Tarakan airfield damaged	5 Glenn Martins

== Aftermath ==
By 13 January, the Sakaguchi Detachment had rounded up all prisoners and captured materials, and handed over the administrative matters to the Navy the following day. The oil facilities at Tarakan by then had been substantially destroyed. In Lingkas, even though much of the oil had in large part been consumed by fire, there was still 12,300 tons of heavy oil left in the surviving tanks, and 120 drums of heavy oil. By June 1942, the wells had been repaired and the oil production continued without any serious hindrance until mid-August 1943, when the first Allied air raids on Tarakan began.

=== Casualties ===
Japanese casualties from the battle are as follows:

- Sakaguchi Detachment: 8 killed (7 on land, 1 at sea), 35 wounded.
- 2nd Kure Special Naval Landing Force: 3 wounded.
- Imperial Japanese Navy: 247 (47 on land, 200 at sea, including 156 from minesweepers W-13 & W-14).

Around 300 Dutch soldiers were killed in the battle. The Japanese captured 871 Dutch troops and interned another 40 wounded ones. In addition, they seized 9 anti-aircraft guns, 69 heavy machine guns, 556 rifles, 15 armored cars, 67 motorcars and ammunition. Some soldiers, such as Everaars, managed to escape and crossed over into mainland Borneo, before being captured. Others hid out in the Tarakan jungles, before eventually falling into the same fate. Spangenberg was captured on 20 March 1942.

=== Reprisals ===
In response for the loss of minesweepers W-13 and W-14, many Dutch POWs, particularly those from the Karoengan battery were subsequently executed by the Japanese. On 18 January 215 prisoners were marched off from the POW camp and drowned at sea near where both minesweepers sank. A differing account stated that survivors from the two sunken minesweepers beheaded the prisoners or tied their hands and feet and threw them into the swamps to drown or be eaten alive by crocodiles. Postwar research could not determine whether Japanese forces massacred all Dutch prisoners at sea or executed several of them on land.

=== Dutch bombing missions ===
Dutch planes flew bombing missions from the Samarinda II Airfield in eastern Borneo on Tarakan Airfield repeatedly on January 13–14. 15 Navy personnel were killed, and an additional 27 were wounded in these raids. However, repairs by the 2nd Base Force engineers brought the airfield back into operation by 16 January when planes of the 23rd Air Flotilla and Tinian Air Wing flew in from Jolo. The airfield would then become the staging ground for the Japanese invasion of Balikpapan.

=== Liberation ===
Tarakan remained under Japanese occupation until May 1945, when it was liberated by Australian troops.
