= Japanese destroyer Asagumo (1937) =

Asashio-class destroyer

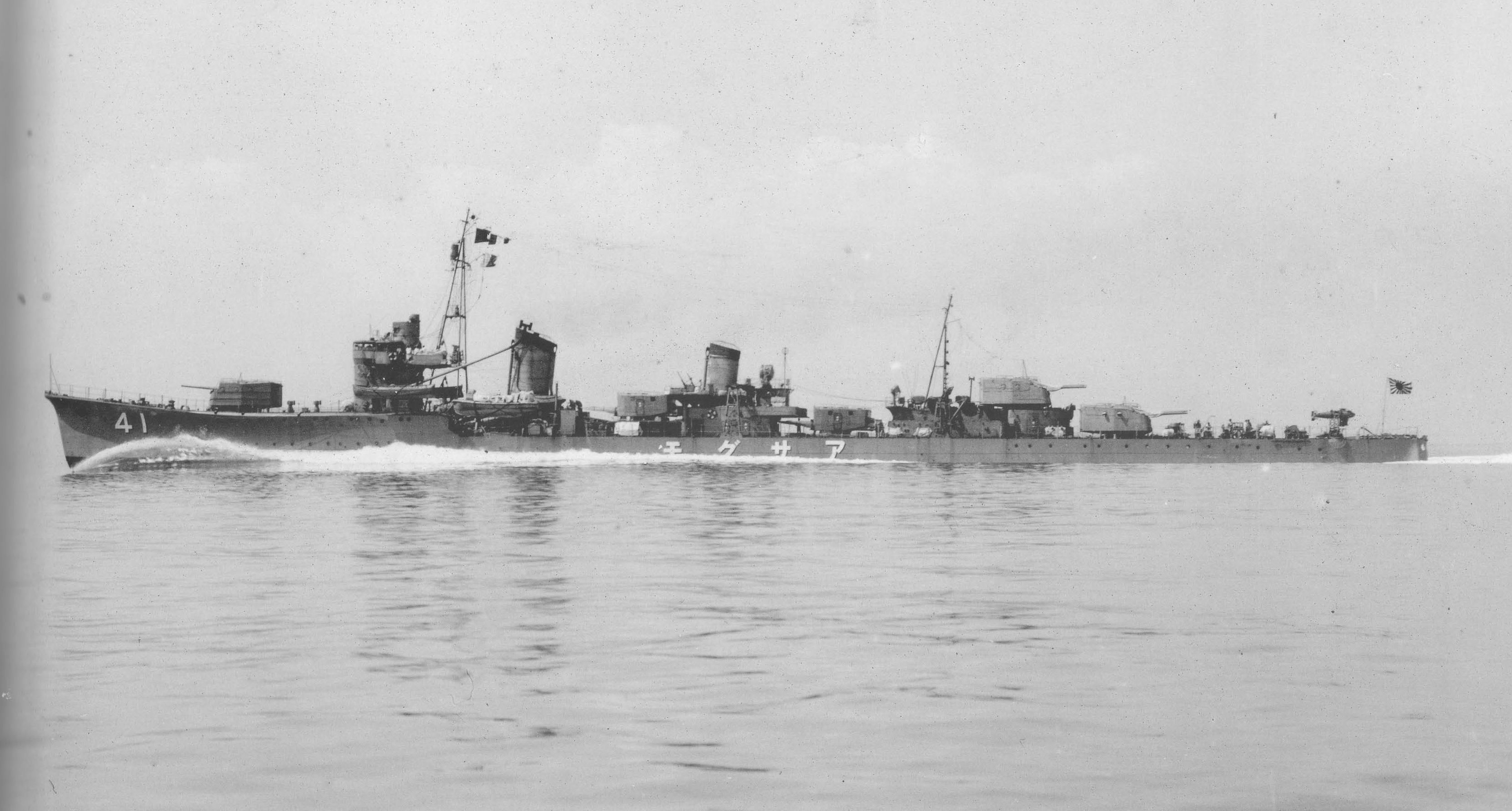
- Asagumo off the Tateyama coast, 14 September 1939

History

Empire of Japan
- Name: Asagumo
- Ordered: 1934 Maru-2 Program
- Builder: Kawasaki Shipbuilding Corporation
- Laid down: 23 December 1936
- Launched: 5 November 1937
- Commissioned: 30 March 1938
- Stricken: 10 January 1945
- Fate: Sunk in Battle of Surigao Strait, 25 October 1944

General characteristics
- Class & type: Asashio-class destroyer
- Displacement: 2,370 long tons (2,408 t)
- Length: 111 m (364 ft) pp; 115 m (377 ft 4 in)waterline; 118.3 m (388 ft 1 in) OA
- Beam: 10.386 m (34 ft 0.9 in)
- Draft: 3.7 m (12 ft 2 in)
- Propulsion: 2-shaft geared turbine, 3 boilers, 50,000 shp (37,285 kW)
- Speed: 35 knots (40 mph; 65 km/h)
- Range: 5,700 nmi (10,600 km) at 10 kn (19 km/h); 960 nmi (1,780 km) at 34 kn (63 km/h)
- Complement: 230
- Armament: 6 × 12.7 cm/50 Type 3 DP guns; up to 28 × Type 96 AA guns; up to 4 × Type 93 AA guns; 8 × 24 in (610 mm) torpedo tubes; 36 depth charges

Service record
- Part of: 41st Destroyer Division (1938–1939); 9th destroyer division (1939–1944); 4th destroyer division (July-October 1944)
- Operations: Battle of the Java Sea (1942); Battle of Midway (1942); Solomon Islands Campaign (1942); Naval Battle of Guadalcanal (1942); Battle of the Bismarck Sea (1943); Battle of Leyte Gulf (1944)
- Victories: HMS Electra (1934); USS Monssen (1941)

Asagumo (朝雲, Morning Cloud) was the fifth of ten Asashio-class destroyers built for the Imperial Japanese Navy in the mid-1930s under the Circle Two Supplementary Naval Expansion Program (Maru Ni Keikaku).

== Construction and commissioning ==
The Asashio-class destroyers were larger and more capable that the preceding Shiratsuyu class, as Japanese naval architects were no longer constrained by the provisions of the London Naval Treaty. These light cruiser-sized vessels were designed to take advantage of Japan’s lead in torpedo technology, and to accompany the Japanese main striking force and in both day and night attacks against the United States Navy as it advanced across the Pacific Ocean, according to Japanese naval strategic projections. Despite being one of the most powerful classes of destroyers in the world at the time of their completion, none survived the Pacific War.

Asagumo, built at the Kawasaki Shipyards in Kobe was laid down on December 23, 1936, launched on November 5, 1937 and commissioned on March 31, 1938. She was assigned as part of destroyer division 41 (Natsugumo, Yamagumo, Asagumo, Minegumo). Later that December, Asagumo joined many Asashio class destroyers in carrying out repairs to her steam turbines after the class proved to suffer from a faulty propulsion system - a flaw which was corrected during refit - before continuing the typical peacetime service. In November of 1939, destroyer division 41 was rebranded destroyer division 9, with Asagumo being promoted as flagship of Captain Yasuo Sato. An uneventful series of patrol duties and visits to foreign harbors ensued until June of 1940, in which Asagumo took on the diligence of transporting the Chinese emperor Puyi to the Japanese battleship Hyūga during a visit to Japan. Asagumo was heavily decorated in ceremonial flags for such an occasion, and the event was filmed and broadcast on Japanese news reels and propaganda movies. The footage showed Asagumo docked in Yokohama, then the arrival of Puyi and his boarding, then Asagumo setting sail for Hyūga as the dockworkers saluted the destroyer with the emperor aboard. A year later, destroyer division 9 was partaking in nighttime training duties when Minegumo and Natsugumo collided with the destroyer Kuroshio, prompting Asagumo to escort the damaged ships to Kure for repairs.

== WWII ==
At the time of the attack on Pearl Harbor, Asagumo led Yamagumo, Natsugumo, and Minegumo in escorting Admiral Nobutake Kondō's Southern Force Main Body out of Mako Guard District as distant cover to the Malaya and Philippines invasion forces in December 1941. In early 1942, Asagumo escorted troop convoys to Lingayen, Tarakan, Balikpapan and Makassar in the Netherlands East Indies.

=== Battle of the Java Sea ===
On 26 February, Asagumo was on convoy escorting duty when a Japanese floatplane spotted a large allied task force consisting of 2 heavy cruisers, 3 light cruisers, and 9 destroyers, attempting to intercept and sink Japanese troop convoys, prompting Asagumo to join a fleet of 2 heavy cruisers, 2 light cruisers, and 13 other destroyers to track down and neutralize the enemy ships. In the afternoon of the next day, the Japanese ships made contact with the enemy fleet, and early into the engagement Asagumo took part in a mass spread of 43 torpedoes at 15,000 yards. She unleashed a full salvo of eight torpedoes, but none hit.

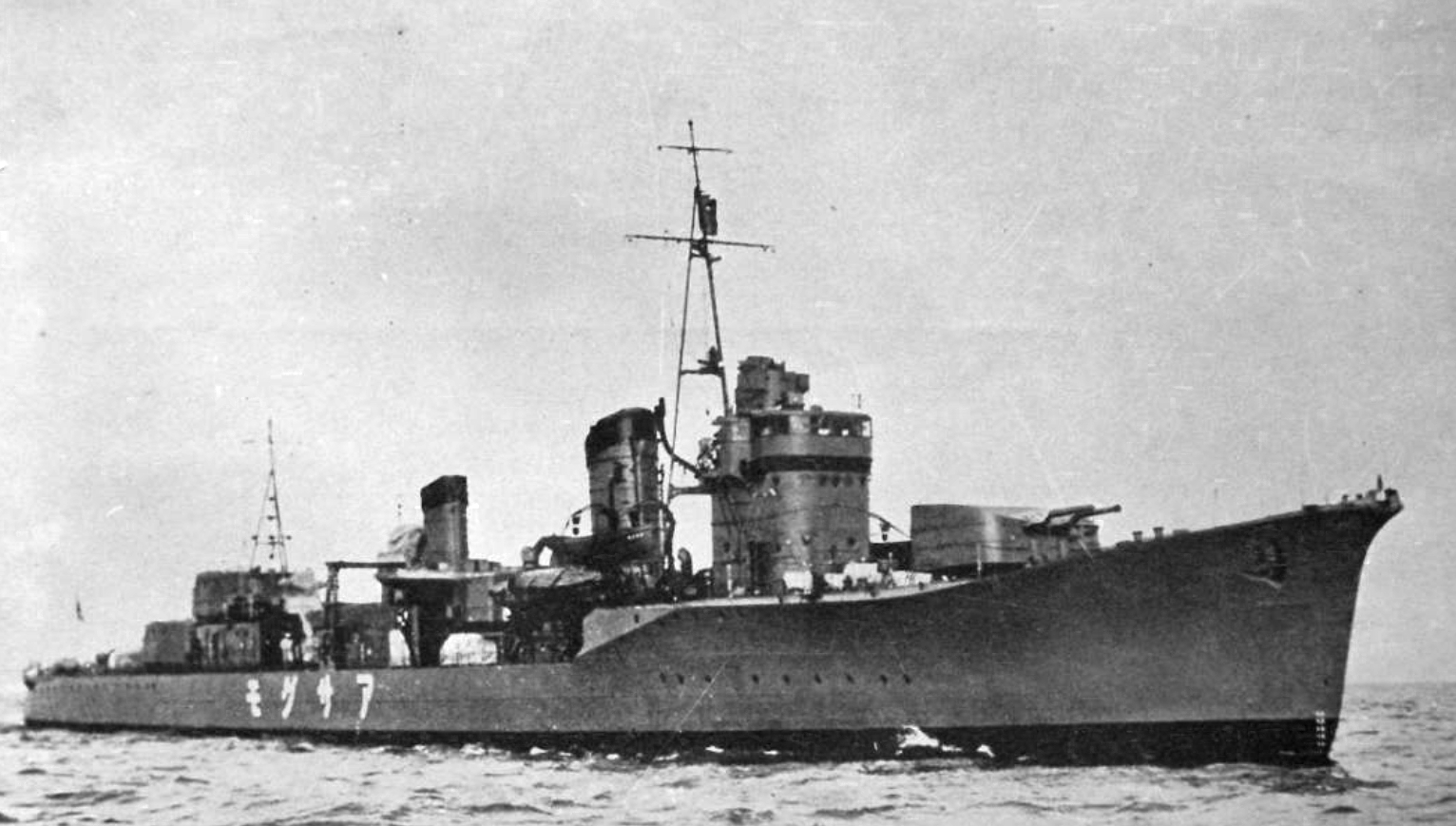
Asagumo anchored off Kobe in November 1938

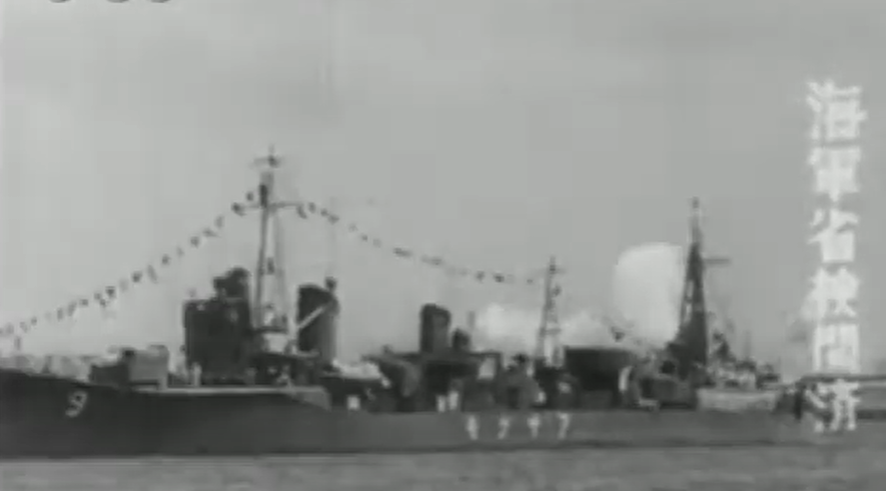
Asagumo anchored in Yokohama preparing to transport the Chinese emperor Puyi, 15 June 1940

However, shortly afterwards Asagumo noticed the limping heavy cruiser HMS Exeter, crippled by a shell hit from the Haguro, attempting to escape the battle, and more crucially three British destroyers attempting to cover her, prompting Asagumo and Minegumo to attack the trio, Asagumo in particular engaging in a gunnery duel with HMS Electra. During the 1v1, Electra managed score hits with her 4.7-inch (12 cm) guns that forced Asagumo to temporarily halt for repairs, killing 4 men and injuring 19 others, but Asagumo inflicted far more damage than she received, hitting Electra with shells that destroyed her engine room and her A and X turrets, wrecked her communications, and disabled electrical power. Dead in the water with half her gun battery functional, the crippled Electra fired off her torpedoes, but none hit, and in turn Minegumo switched fire from the other destroyers and joined Asagumo in pounding Electra, which they together quickly finished off, forcing Electra's crew to abandon ship after her remaining guns were destroyed and leave the destroyer to sink.

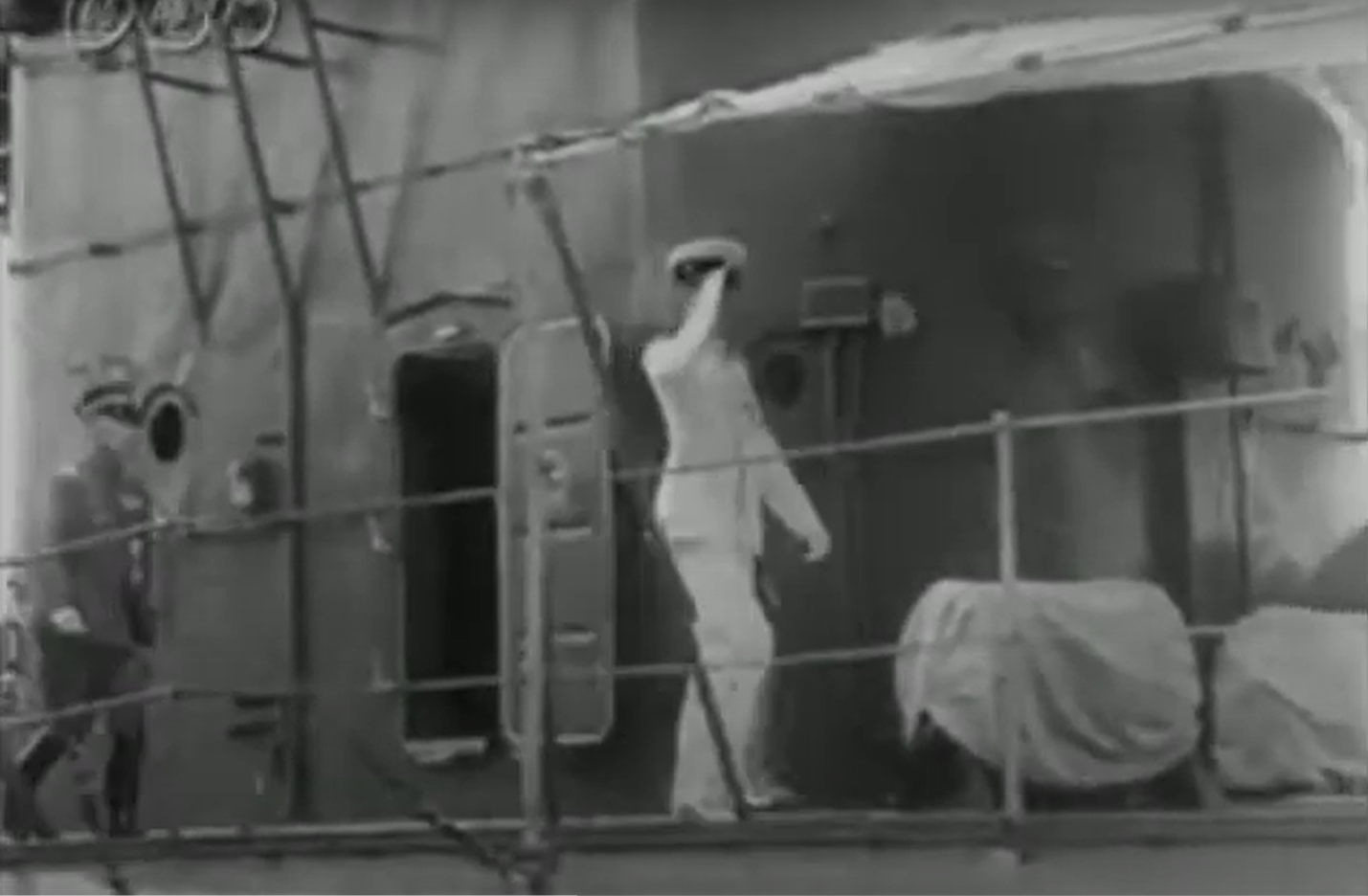
Emperor Puyi saluting Asagumo's crew, walking alongside the ship's bridge

After her take down of Electra, Asagumo began to pick up speed after damage control restarted her engines, and immediately evacuated from the battle and returned to Balikpapan for emergency repairs, which lasted from 1–18 March, immediately followed by Asagumo escorting the repair ship Yamabiko Maru to Makassar, and returned at the end of the month to the Yokosuka Naval Arsenal for further repairs which lasted until the end of the month. At the end of May, Asagumo joined the escort for the Midway Invasion Force during the Battle of Midway, but returned to the Aleutians once the battle turned into a devastating defeat which lost Japan four aircraft carriers and a heavy cruiser. In July, she was sent to northern waters, patrolling from Ōminato Guard District towards the Kurile Islands. Afterwards, she was sent south to Truk together with the cruiser Chōkai, and onwards to Kwajalein, returning to Yokosuka on 8 August 1942. Returning to Truk later that month, Asagumo escorted aircraft carriers in the Battle of the Eastern Solomons to offer additional AA defense. From September, she was assigned to patrols from Truk towards Shortland, and in October and November was assigned to nine "Tokyo Express" high speed transport operations in the Solomon Islands. During this time, she was made the flagship of the 4th Torpedo Squadron, and escorted aircraft carriers during the Battle of Santa Cruz.

=== Naval battle of Guadalcanal ===
On November 9, Asagumo departed Truk as part of a force with a mission to bombard Henderson Field, a former Japanese air base which was captured by US forces and being used against Japanese shipping. The force centered around the battleships Hiei and Kirishima, with an escort of the light cruiser Nagara and eleven destroyers, Asagumo included. The destroyers initially operated in standard formation, but rain squalls broke up the formation and left the destroyers operating in small clusters, in turn leaving Asagumo operating alongside the destroyers Murasame and Samidare. Eventually, their plan was intercepted by US intelligence, and by 1:25 in the morning of the 13th, signs of enemy ships began to appear. At 1:48, an engagement between the Japanese ships and a total of two US heavy cruisers, three light cruisers, and eight destroyers began in what became the first naval battle of Guadalcanal, but Asagumo's group was on the far side of the formation and initially prevented from seeing action.

Eventually, Asagumo joined the battle after 2:10, and immediately noticed the destroyer Amatsukaze under fire from the light cruiser USS Helena, and with Murasame and Samidare covered her fellow destroyer and engaged the cruiser. Murasame falsely claimed to torpedo Helena, and in turn Murasame and Samidare both took 6-inch (152 mm) shell hits, but Asagumo was not damaged and successfully saved Amatsukaze from potentially being sunk. Just after 2:20, the destroyers noticed another target as star shells illuminated the destroyer USS Monssen, which mistook the star shells for friendly ships signaling her and signaled back. In response, Asagumo, Murasame, and Samidare blasted Monssen to starboard, Asagumo in particular firing off 88 5-inch (127 mm) rounds against the target, several of which hit. Two 5-inch (127 mm) shells immediately hit forward and destroyed Monssen's 5-inch (127 mm) gun turret 1, killing the entire gun crew, before more hits destroyed the forward fire room and after engine. Hiei soon bushwacked Monssen to port and hit the destroyer with three 14-inch (356 mm) shells, while Asagumo, Murasame, and Samidare continued to smother Monssen in gunfire from the opposite side. Shell hits first plunged into the turret 2 handing room and started a powder fire which took the gun out of action, before her turret 5, bridge, fire control, and rangefinder were too destroyed. 5-inch (127 mm) guns no 3 and 4 continued to fruitlessly fire away until they too were blasted away, along with the ship's steering gear, rudder, and depth charges.

Dead in the water, burning furiously, and lacking a single functioning weapon after at least 39 shell hits, Asagumo then fired off eight torpedoes against the hulked Monssen. Several Japanese torpedoes were seen passing underneath the destroyer, but if any hit is unknown. Regardless, Monssen was abandoned 20 minutes later and sank over several hours with the loss of 150 sailors. However, during the battle, the destroyer Yūdachi was crippled by gunfire from the destroyer USS Sterett, prompting Asagumo to assist the mauled vessel, watching as her crew was removed and a scuttling attempt failed (Yūdachi was later finished off by the heavy cruiser USS Portland).

Asagumo continued on to take part in the bombardment, even after Hiei was sunk by American forces, seeing no action the next day. However, in the early morning of the 15th, the force was encountered by another US task force during the second naval battle of Guadalcanal. In the ensuing action, three US destroyers were sunk and the battleship USS South Dakota was badly damaged, but in turn Kirishima lost a gunfight to the battleship USS Washington, being hit by twenty 16-inch (406 mm) shells and seventeen 5-inch (127 mm) shells. Asagumo unleashed four type 93 torpedoes against South Dakota, but none hit, before she helped to evacuate Kirishima, taking on several survivors before leaving Kirishima to sink.

After the battle, Asagumo was docked in Truk for maintenance for the rest of the month, then from 21 December to 8 January 1943, she celebrated New Years by escorting the escort carrier Chūyō from Truk to Yokosuka and back, before spending the rest of January escorting troop convoys in company with the aircraft carrier Junyō. With the start of February, Asagumo covered the 2nd and 3rd evacuations of Guadalcanal, before departing for Palau. From the 19th to the 23rd, Asagumo escorted a large troop convoy to first to Wewak, then to Rabaul, where she spent the rest of the month at anchor.

=== Battle of the Bismarck Sea ===
Main Article: Battle of the Bismarck Sea

With the start of March, Asagumo was assigned to a flotilla of 8 destroyers with the goal of escorting 8 transport ships carrying almost 7,000 troops and the needed artillery and fuel to Lae, which was for reinforcement to turn away General MacArthur's forces from New Guinea. The force departed Rabaul on the 1st, only to be spotted by allied aircraft later that day. The day after, the first wave of attacks by American B-17 bombers and P-38 heavy fighters from several New Guinea air bases sank the troop ship Kyokusei Maru, which promoted Asagumo and Yukikaze to rescue 950 survivors and broke away from the convoy to deliver them to Lae, before rejoining the convoy the next day due to its low cruising speed of 7 knots. During Asagumo's absence, another wave of aircraft inflicted minor damage to a few transport ships, but scored no sinkings.

It was on the 3rd that the air attacks began picking up in frequency, and the devastation inflicted on the Japanese convoy accordingly matched. A first wave saw over 100 aircraft intercepted and interrupted by Japanese fighters, but this attack succeeded in splitting up the convoy from a manageable formation. Another wave of aircraft pounced on the now separated ships, and the destroyer Shirayuki was hit by a bomb which detonated her magazines and required her to be scuttled, followed by the crippling of the destroyers Arashio and Tokisukaze and the sinking of the transport ship Nojima Maru, then the sinking of the destroyer Asashio. Wave after wave of aircraft throughout the rest of the day sank the remaining six transport ships, leaving Asagumo to overload herself with 485 survivors from multiple sunken ships before ferrying them to Rabaul. In the morning of the 4th, the wounded Arashio finally sank by the bow while more aircraft finished off the crippled and abandoned Tokitsukaze, which further forced Asagumo and others to conduct rescue operations for the rest of the day and the entire following day, until almost 4,000 ground troops were rescued; 1,200 of which diminishly reinforced Lae while the rest were returned to Rabaul, thus ending one of the grandest Japanese defeats of the war up to that point.

=== Further operations ===
Just one day later, Minegumo was torpedoed and sunk by the destroyer USS Waller at the battle of the Blackett Strait. Natsugumo had been sunk by aircraft earlier at the battle of Cape Esperance, while Yamagumo had been crippled by a mine early into the war and reassigned to local patrol duties. These three events left Asagumo as the sole ship of destroyer division 9. As a result, at the start of April the destroyers Shirakumo and Usugumo were relocated to desdiv 9 and placed under Asagumo's command. During the remainder of March and first week of April, she made several transport runs to reinforce the Japanese position at Kolombangara, before returning to Yokosuka for repairs on 13 April. Asagumo left Yokosuka on 21 May, and spent the rest of the month on patrol and escort duties in Paramushiro, and on 7 June she escorted Shirakumo - having been damaged in a collision with the destroyer Numakaze - to Paramushiro, and immediately afterwards commander Iwahashi was reassigned to the destroyer squadron 1 staff, with commander Shibayama Kazuo taking charge of the destroyer.

On 7 July, Asagumo took part in a troop evacuation run from Kiska, but this operation was aborted due to bad weather as she returned to base 10 days later. From 22 July to 1 August, she home strucked a successful evacuation run from Kiska, before escorting the heavy cruiser Maya to Yokosuka. Asagumo then sailied to Ominato where she spent the following 2 month in local patrol duties. At the end of October, Asagumo was reassigned to destroyer division 10, consisting of the destroyers Kazagumo and Akigumo, and now Asagumo. She then returned to Yokosuka for maintenance, where her X turret was removed and replaced with a pair of triple 25 mm guns, along with other AA and radar upgrades.

On New Years, Asagumo escorted a troop convoy from Sasebo to Truk, arriving on 7 January 1944 before escorting the battleship Yamato to Kure from the 10th to the 16th. From 6-13 February, Asagumo escorted the aircraft carriers Shōkaku and Zuikaku from Kure to Singapore before escorting Zuikaku back to Kure then to Singapore again from 20 February to 15 March. Asagumo remained in port before escorting the combined fleet from Lingga to Tawi-Tawi from 12-15 May, then the battleship Fusō on a failed troop transport mission to Davao and back from 30 May to 5 June. On 7 June, destroyer division 10 escorted the heavy cruisers Myōkō and Haguro on a troop transport mission, and the next day Kazagumo was torpedoed and sunk by the submarine USS Hake, which forced Asagumo to rescue 133 survivors. During the battle of the Philippine Sea, Asagumo escorted Admiral Ozawa's carrier division, and from the 19th to the 20th the aircraft carriers Taihō and Shōkaku were sunk to submarine attacks, while the aircraft carrier Hiyō was sunk by torpedo bombers from the light carrier USS Belleau Wood. Asagumo evaded waves of aircraft from American carriers, and departed for Okinawa independently on the 21st where she was limited to 16 knots due to fuel problems, then further returned to Hashirajima on the 24th.

On 10 July, Asagumo was incorporated into the 4th destroyer division where she was reunited with Yamagumo, as well as the destroyers Michishio and Shigure. From 14-29 July, Asagumo escorted the heavy cruiser Maya on a troop transport mission from Yokosuka to Okinawa and Lingga.

=== Battle of Leyte Gulf ===
Main Article: Battle of Leyte Gulf

On 18 October 1944, Asagumo would escort the Japanese fleet to Brunei, arriving on the 20th, in preparation for Operation Sho-go. Allied forces were preparing for a full invasion of the Philippines, which acted as a crucial supply lane between the Dutch East Indies and mainland Japan, and a US recapture would cut off Japan's main supply of oil and cripple their navy's capability as a fighting force. To counteract this operation, the Japanese would use a decoy aircraft carrier group to lure out the better equipped US fleet and allow their own fleet of Japanese surface ships to attack and sink allied invasion convoys. Rather than being assigned to Admiral Kurita's main force, Asagumo and the rest of destroyer division 4 was assigned to Admiral Nishimura's secondary fleet, consisting of the battleships Fusō and Yamashiro, 3 heavy cruisers, 1 light cruiser, and 8 (later 11) destroyers, including Asagumo. On the 22nd, the Japanese fleet departed Brunei for battle. Asagumo was specifically assigned to the southern ring, consisting of Fusō and Yamashiro, the heavy cruiser Mogami, and desdiv 4.

By 8:55, a flight of 20 dive bombers from the aircraft carriers USS Enterprise and USS Franklin attacked the fleet. Franklin aircraft sank the destroyer Wakaba, while Enterprise planes lightly damaged Fuso with a bomb hit to her stern which destroyed a floatplane and conducted strafing runs on Mogami, but the force continued into the Surigao Straight. Later at 19:00, Asagumo and the rest of the southern ring swept for enemy torpedo boats, but this yielded no action.

At 22:36, the torpedo boat USS PT-131 stumbled into the Japanese formation, followed by several others throughout the rest of the night and into the early morning, beginning the Battle of the Surigao Strait. Asagumo chased off PT boats several times with gunfire, but failed to score any sinking. However, Admiral Oldendorf's fleet of 6 battleships, 4 heavy cruisers, 4 light cruisers, and 28 destroyers set a trap in the Surigao Strait and began an ambush, starting with torpedo attacks from his many destroyers around 3:20. Three torpedoes from USS Melvin crippled Fusō, while a torpedo from USS Monssen badly damaged Yamashiro. Most directly, two or three torpedoes from USS McDermut blasted apart the Yamagumo and sank Asagumo's contemporary since the start of the war with the loss of all but 2 men. Contrary to popular belief, McDermut's torpedoes did not hit Michishio or Asagumo as they sailed alongside the straggling but surviving battleships.

5 minutes later as the southern ring continued on, another squadron of allied destroyers unloaded a spread of torpedoes right as the Japanese ships sailed into the line of fire of the American battleships. Three torpedoes from USS Daly tore into Fusō and finished her off. However, it was a torpedo from HMAS Arunta which smashed into Asagumo's bow and tore it off up to turret 1, cutting her speed to 10 knots. Another Arunta torpedo disabled the Michishio, leaving her to be finished off by the destroyer USS Hutchins. Despite this, Asagumo continued to sail and prepared to unload a salvo of torpedoes, only to be met by gunfire from the heavy cruiser USS Portland and the destroyers Daly and USS Bache. At 3:58, Asagumo increased speed to 25 knots despite her damaged bow and fired her forward torpedoes and opened fire with her aft guns at the destroyer Hutchins, and two torpedoes nearly hit the destroyer USS Richard P Leary at 4:11. In turn, several enemy shells hit amidships and started a large fire which destroyed the aft torpedo mount and the aft engine room. Luckily, Asagumo managed to withdraw from the engagement before being fatally damaged as her attackers turned their guns on the Mogami.

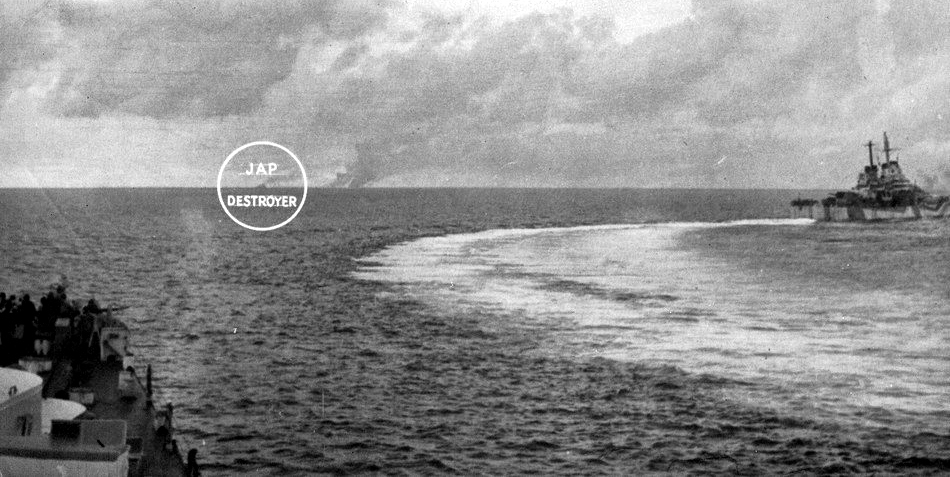
The US light cruisers USS Denver and USS Columbia firing on the crippled Asagumo, 25 October 1944

Asagumo survived into the break of daylight attempting to limp away from the enemy action, but at 6:50 she was finally caught by the light cruisers USS Denver and USS Columbia and the destroyers USS Robinson, Bryant, and Halford sweeping for escaping or crippled Japanese ships; Denver having assisted in finishing off the crippled Mogami nearly two hours earlier. The squadron of American warships opened fire as shells soon started another large fire as 6-inch (152 mm) and 5-inch (127 mm) shells poked holes throughout the crippled destroyer until she finally sank at 7:18 with the loss of most of her crew. 39 survivors, including commander Shibayama, were rescued by American ships, bringing an end to Asagumo. Some sources say she rescued survivors from the sunken Fusō but this remains unconfirmed, and regardless any Fusō survivors went down with the ship.

Her wreck was discovered by RV Petrel in late 2017, with her hull and superstructure mostly intact.

== Books ==
- D'Albas, Andrieu (1965). Death of a Navy: Japanese Naval Action in World War II. Devin-Adair Pub. ISBN 0-8159-5302-X.
- Brown, David (1990). Warship Losses of World War Two. Naval Institute Press. ISBN 1-55750-914-X.
- Hammel, Eric (1988). Guadalcanal: Decision at Sea : The Naval Battle of Guadalcanal, Nov. 13–15, 1942. CA: Pacifica Press. ISBN 0-517-56952-3.
- Howarth, Stephen (1983). The Fighting Ships of the Rising Sun: The Drama of the Imperial Japanese Navy, 1895–1945. Atheneum. ISBN 0-689-11402-8.
- Jentsura, Hansgeorg (1976). Warships of the Imperial Japanese Navy, 1869–1945. US Naval Institute Press. ISBN 0-87021-893-X.
- Nelson, Andrew N. (1967). Japanese–English Character Dictionary. Tuttle. ISBN 0-8048-0408-7.
- Watts, Anthony J (1967). Japanese Warships of World War II. Doubleday. ISBN 978-0-3850-9189-3.
- Whitley, M J (2000). Destroyers of World War Two: An International Encyclopedia. London: Arms and Armour Press. ISBN 1-85409-521-8.
- Cox, Jeffrey R (2014) Rising Sun, Falling Skies: The Disastrous Java Sea Campaign of World War II. Osprey. ISBN 978-1-4728-1060-1
- Hara, Tameichi (1961). Japanese Destroyer Captain. New York: Ballantine Books. ISBN 0-345-02522-9.
- Walker, Brent L (2024). Yukikaze's War. Cambridge University Press. ISBN 978-1-108-83729-3
- Samuel Eliot Morison (1949). The Struggle for Guadalcanal, August 1942 – February 1943. History of United States Naval Operations in World War II. Vol. 5. Boston: Little, Brown and Company. ISBN 978-0-316-58305-3
