= 1st Carrier Division =

First Carrier Division
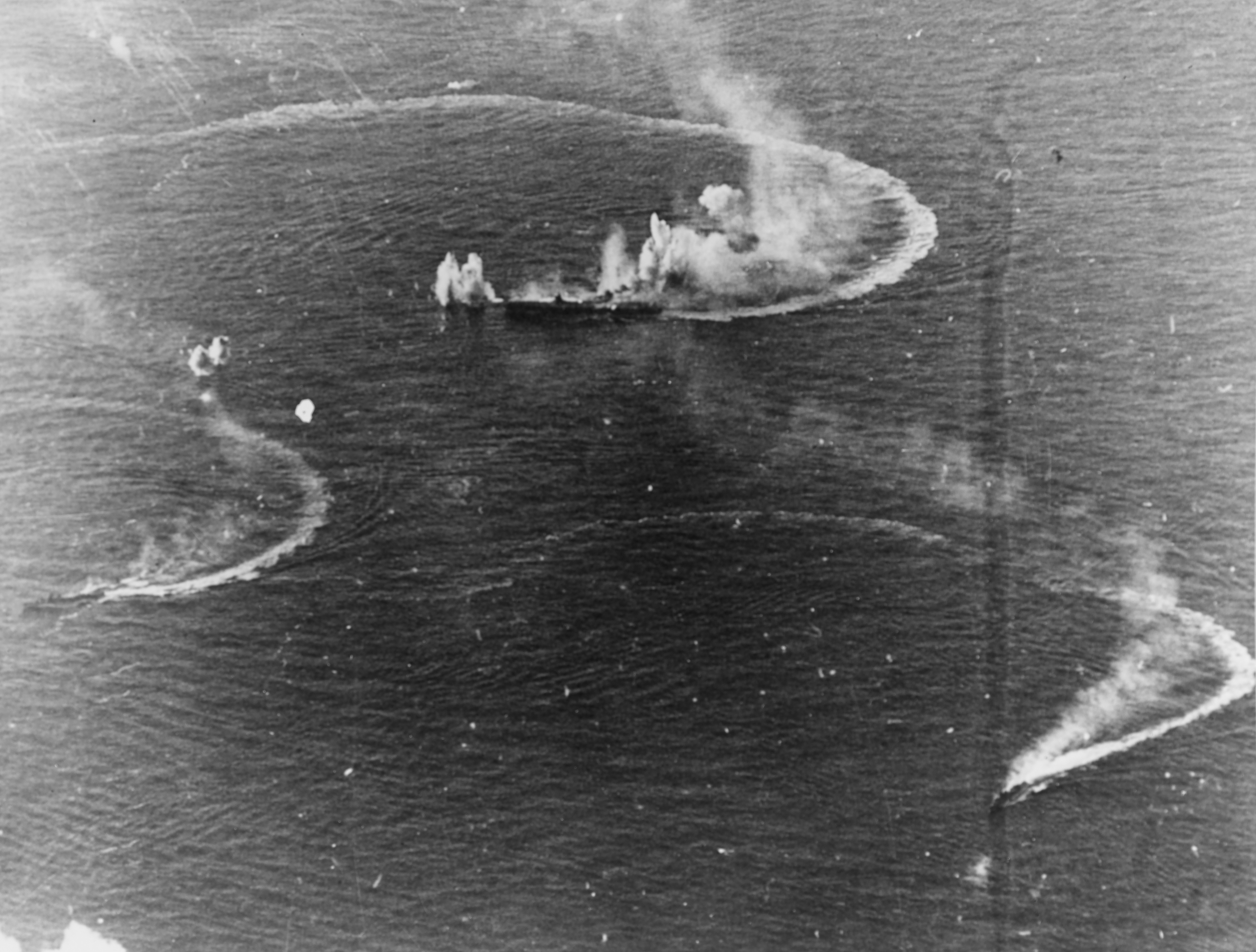
- The First Carrier Division's Zuikaku (center) and two destroyers under attack by U.S. Navy carrier aircraft during the Battle of the Philippine Sea.
- Active: April 1, 1928 – April 10, 1945
- Country: Empire of Japan
- Allegiance: Axis Powers of World War II
- Branch: Imperial Japanese Navy
- Type: Naval aviation unit
- Role: Aircraft carrier support
- Engagements: Attack on Pearl Harbor; Battle of Rabaul; Bombing of Darwin; Indian Ocean raid Battle of Midway; Battle of the Eastern Solomons; Battle of the Santa Cruz Islands; Battle of the Philippine Sea

Commanders
- Notable commanders: Chūichi Nagumo Jisaburo Ozawa

The First Carrier Division (第一航空戦隊, Dai Ichi Kōkū sentai; often abbreviated as 一航戦 Ichikō-sen) was an aircraft carrier unit of the Imperial Japanese Navy's First Air Fleet. At the beginning of the Pacific Campaign of World War II, the First Carrier Division consisted of the fleet carriers Akagi and Kaga. The division participated in the Attack on Pearl Harbor and Indian Ocean Raid. After Akagi and Kaga were sunk at the Battle of Midway in June 1942, carriers Shōkaku, Zuikaku, and Zuihō were redesignated as the First Carrier Division.

== Organization (extract) ==
Date	Ships
1 April 1928 (original)	Akagi, Hōshō and Destroyer Squadron 6: Ume, Kusunoki
1 December 1931	Kaga, Notoro and Destroyer Squadron 2 : Minekaze, Okikaze, Yakaze, Sawakaze
15 November 1934	Ryūjō, Hōshō and Destroyer Squadron 5: Asakaze, Harukaze, Matsukaze, Hatakaze
1 December 1937	Kaga and Destroyer Squadron 29: Oite, Hayate, Asanagi, Yūnagi
15 November 1939	Akagi and Destroyer Squadron 19: Isonami, Uranami, Ayanami, Shikinami
10 April 1941	Akagi, Kaga and Destroyer Squadron 7: Akebono, Ushio
14 July 1942	Shōkaku, Zuikaku, Zuihō
1 April 1944	Taihō, Shōkaku, Zuikaku
15 August 1944	Unryū, Amagi
15 December 1944	Amagi, Unryū, Katsuragi, Jun'yō, Ryūhō
10 April 1945	dissolved

== Commander ==
	Rank	Name	Date
1	R.ADM	Sankichi Takahashi	1 April 1928
x		Disbanded	10 December 1928
2	R.ADM	Sankichi Takahashi	1 April 1929
3	R.ADM	Yurikazu Edahara	30 November 1929
4	R.ADM	Takayoshi Katō	1 December 1930
5	R.ADM	Koshirō Oikawa	15 November 1932
6	R.ADM	Isoroku Yamamoto	3 October 1933
7	R.ADM	Hideho Wada	1 June 1934
8	R.ADM	Saburō Satō	15 November 1935
9	R.ADM	Shirō Takasu	1 December 1936
10	R.ADM	Jin'ichi Kusaka	1 December 1937
11	R.ADM	Boshirō Hosogaya	25 April 1938
12	R.ADM	Jisaburō Ozawa	15 November 1939
13	R.ADM	Michitaro Tozuka	1 November 1940
14	V.ADM	Chūichi Nagumo	10 April 1941
15	V.ADM	Jisaburō Ozawa	11 November 1942
16	R.ADM	Keizō Komura	1 October 1944
17	R.ADM	Sueo Ōbayashi	10 December 1944
x		vacant post	10 February 1945
x		dissolved	10 April 1945

The First Carrier Division participated in the largest carrier-to-carrier battle in history, the Battle of the Marianas, and specifically the aircraft carrier Battle of the Philippine Sea (the so-called “Great Marianas Turkey Shoot”) on 19–20 June, where the Japanese naval forces were decisively defeated with heavy and irreplaceable losses to their carrier-borne and land-based aircraft. As a result of the massive losses suffered to her airgroup, Zuikaku would play a support role in the Japanese fleet from this point on, up until her sinking during the Battle of Leyte Gulf.
