= Japanese destroyer Akikaze =

Destroyer of the Imperial Japanese Navy

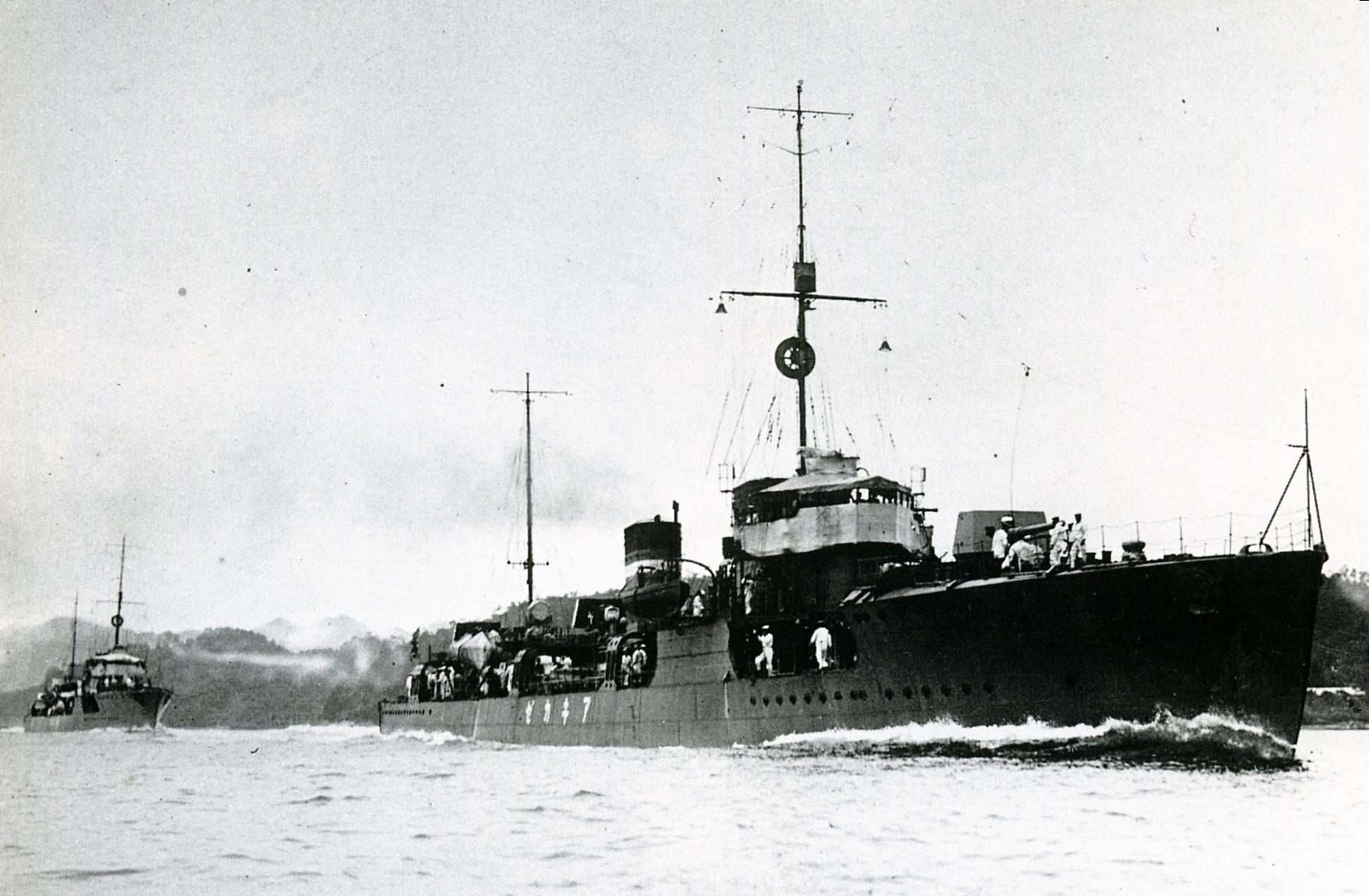
- Akikaze departing Yokosuka, 1923

History

Empire of Japan
- Name: Akikaze
- Ordered: fiscal 1918
- Builder: Mitsubishi shipyards, Nagasaki, Japan
- Laid down: 7 June 1920
- Launched: 14 December 1920
- Commissioned: 16 September 1921
- Stricken: 10 January 1945
- Fate: Torpedoed and sunk on 3 November 1944

General characteristics
- Class & type: Minekaze-class destroyer
- Displacement: 1,234 t (1,215 long tons) (normal); 1,367 t (1,345 long tons) (full load)
- Length: 97.5 m (319 ft 11 in) p.p.; 102.6 m (336 ft 7 in) o/a
- Beam: 8.92 m (29 ft 3 in)
- Draft: 2.79 m (9 ft 2 in)
- Installed power: 28,700 kW (38,500 shp)
- Propulsion: 2 × Mitsubishi-Parsons geared turbines; 4 × boilers; 2 × shafts
- Speed: 72 km/h (39 kn; 45 mph)
- Range: 6,700 km (3,600 nmi; 4,200 mi) at 26 km/h (14 kn; 16 mph)
- Complement: 154
- Armament: 4 × 120 mm (4.7 in)/45 cal Type 3 naval guns; 6 × 533 mm (21.0 in) torpedo tubes; 2 × 7.7 mm (0.303 in) machine guns; 20 × naval mines

Akikaze (秋風, Autumn Wind) was a Minekaze-class destroyer, built for the Imperial Japanese Navy immediately following the end of World War I. The Minekaze class of destroyers were considered advanced for their time; these ships served as first-line destroyers through the 1930s. The class was considered obsolete by the start of the Pacific War but served in a number of roles including minesweeper, aircraft rescue, and Kaiten-carriers. On March 18, 1943, Akikaze was the scene of a massacre of about 60 civilians on board.

== History ==
Construction of the large-sized Minekaze-class destroyers was authorized as part of the Imperial Japanese Navy's 8-4 Fleet Program (1917–1920) with the first two ships of the class built under the 1917 fiscal programme, followed by five each under the 1918 and 1919 programmes and two ships under the 1920 fiscal programme. The Minekaze-class destroyer was designed to complement the medium-sized Momi class, with which they shared many common design characteristics. Equipped with powerful engines, these vessels were capable of high speeds and were intended as escorts for the projected Amagi-class battlecruisers, which were ultimately never built. Akikaze was built at the Maizuru Naval Arsenal and was the ninth ship of the Minekaze class. She was laid down on 7 June 1920, and launched on 14 December 1920. Completed on 1 April 1921, Akikaze was commissioned on 16 September 1921.

On completion, Akikaze joined sister ships Hakaze, Tachikaze, and Hokaze at the Yokosuka Naval District to form Destroyer Division 4 under Torpedo Squadron 1 (第1水雷戦隊). In 1938–1939, the division was assigned to patrols of the central China coastline in support of Japanese combat operations in the Second Sino-Japanese War.

=== World War II ===
In World War II, Akikaze performed patrol and convoy escort duties. At the time of the attack on Pearl Harbor, Akikaze (assigned to Destroyer Division 34 of the IJN 11th Air Fleet) was based at Takao, and provided air sea rescue support for the "Operation M" (the Japanese invasion of the Philippines), and escort of convoys to Davao and Legazpi.

From January to the end of April 1942, Akikaze was based at Davao, escorting shipping between Davao and Ambon. After a brief return to Maizuru for repairs in May 1942, Akikaze was based out of Rabaul, escorting transports throughout the Pacific. On 14 March 1943, Akikaze and two other destroyers attacked a submarine — possibly USS Triton — near Kairiru Island 3°20′10″S 143°33′0″E.

After repairs again at Maizuru in April 1943, Akikaze returned to Rabaul to resume her escort and patrol duties. She was heavily damaged in an air raid on 2 August which killed her captain Lieutenant Commander Tsurukichi Sabe and resulted 22 other casualties. Akikaze was forced to return to Maizuru for repairs again in September. Returning to Rabaul again in mid-November, she made several "Tokyo Express" troop transport runs to New Guinea from October 1943-February 1944. In March, she was reassigned to Truk, where she provided escort for convoys between Truk, Saipan and Palau. On 1 May 1944, Akikaze was reassigned to Destroyer Division 30 of the Central Pacific Fleet. After escorting a convoy from Japan to Davao and Manila, she was based at Manila. However, Destroyer Division 30 was reassigned to the Combined Fleet on 20 August.

On 24–25 October, Akikaze led the escort for the 2nd Supply Force of Admiral Ozawa's Northern Force at the Battle of Leyte Gulf, rescuing survivors from the torpedoed fleet oiler Jinei Maru, and taking them to Mako.

On 1 November, Destroyer Division 30 — Yūzuki (flagship), Uzuki, and Akikaze — departed Mako, escorting aircraft carrier Jun'yō and cruiser Kiso toward Brunei. On 3 November, the submarine USS Pintado fired a spread of torpedoes at Jun'yō, but Akikaze, under the command of Lieutenant Commander Nitaro Yamazaki, intercepted them, sacrificing herself to save the carrier. Akikaze sank with all 205 hands, 257 km (160 mi) west of Cape Bolinao, Luzon at position 16°48′N 117°17′E.

On 10 January 1945, Akikaze was struck from the Navy List.

== Massacre of civilians ==
On 18 March 1943, captained by Lieutenant Commander Tsurukichi Sabe, Akikaze was the scene of a war crime. During construction of a seaplane base at Kairiru Island Akikaze evacuated the personnel of the Roman Catholic mission headquarters on that island and also several individuals from Wewak. These included Bishop Joseph Loerks (Lörks), 38 missionaries (31 of whom were German nationals) including 18 nuns, one New Guinea girl, and two Chinese infants (apparently the children of Wewak storekeeper Ning Hee). The vessel then called at Manus, where it picked up 20 others, again mostly Germans, including six missionaries from the Liebenzell Evangelical Mission, three other nuns and three other priests, a European infant, a plantation owner named Carl Muster and plantation overseer Peter Mathies, two Chinese, and apparently four Malays. The commander of Akikaze then received orders from 8th Fleet HQ to "dispose of" all civilians on board. "Between Manus and Rabaul each of the adults was strung up by the hands on a gallows in the stern of the vessel, shot dead by rifle or machine-gun fire, and thrown overboard. The two Chinese infants and the European baby were thrown over alive." As there were U.S. nationals among the victims, the Australian War Crimes Section in Tokyo, having completed its investigation, on 18 July 1947 handed the matter over to the American authorities, who appear to have taken no further action.
