= Japanese destroyer Hokaze =

Destroyer of the Imperial Japanese Navy

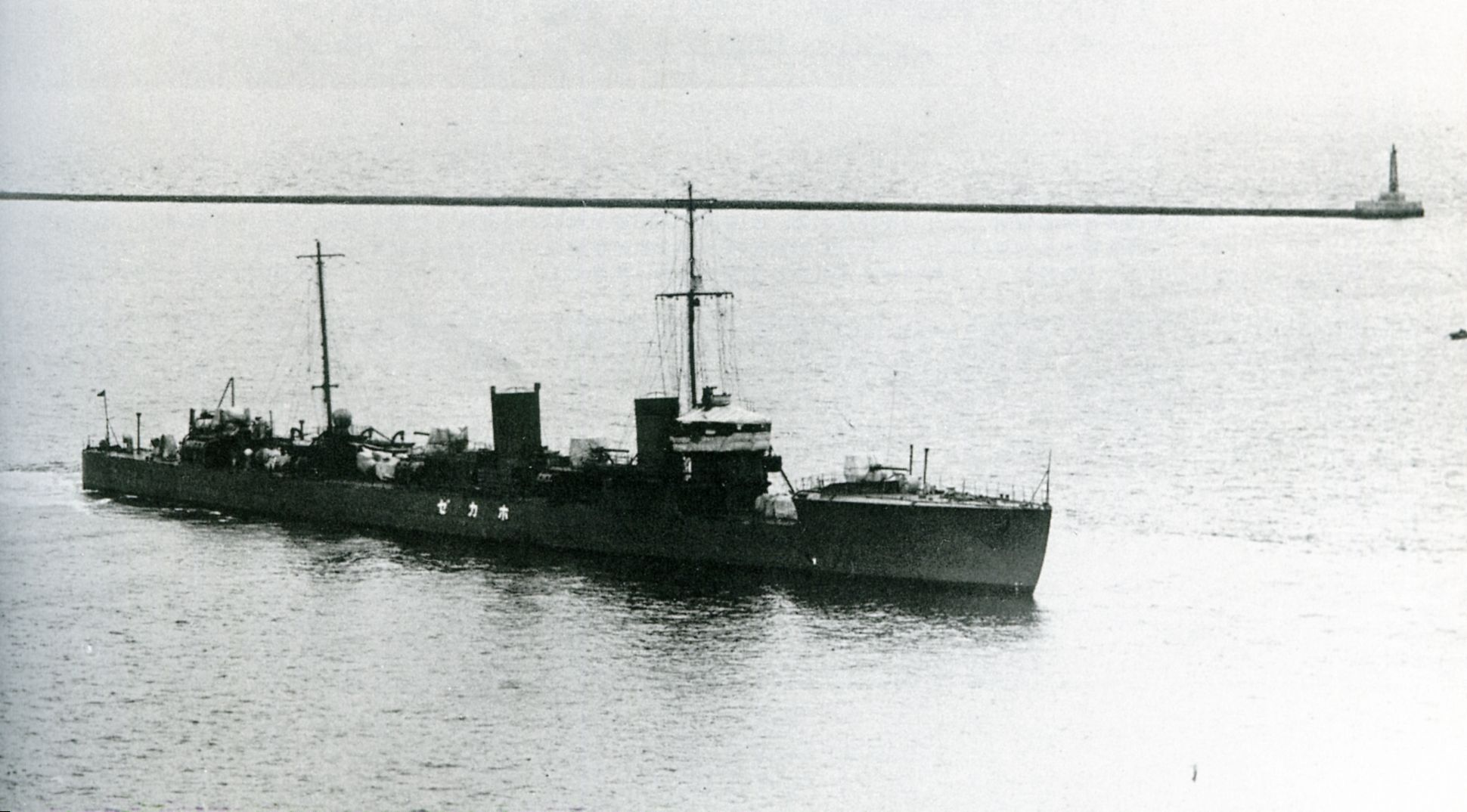
- Hokaze at Yokosuka, 1921

History

Empire of Japan
- Name: Hokaze
- Ordered: 1918 fiscal year
- Builder: Maizuru Naval Arsenal
- Laid down: 30 November 1920
- Launched: 12 July 1921
- Commissioned: 22 December 1921
- Stricken: 10 September 1944
- Fate: Torpedoed and sunk on 6 July 1944

General characteristics
- Class & type: Minekaze-class destroyer
- Displacement: 1,215 long tons (1,234 t) normal, 1,345 long tons (1,367 t) full load
- Length: 97.5 m (320 ft) pp, 102.6 m (337 ft) overall
- Beam: 8.92 m (29.3 ft)
- Draught: 2.79 m (9.2 ft)
- Propulsion: 2-shaft Mitsubishi-Parsons geared turbines, 4 boilers 38,500 ihp (28,700 kW)
- Speed: 39 knots (72 km/h)
- Range: 3,600 nautical miles (6,700 km) at 14 knots (26 km/h)
- Complement: 154
- Armament: 4 × Type 3 120 mm 45 caliber naval gun; 6 × 21 in (533 mm) torpedo tubes; 2 × 7.7 mm machine guns; 16 × naval mines

Service record
- Operations: Second Sino-Japanese War; Pacific War

Hokaze (帆風, Sail Wind) was a Minekaze-class destroyer, built for the Imperial Japanese Navy immediately following World War I. Advanced for their time, these ships served as first-line destroyers through the 1930s, but were considered obsolescent by the start of the Pacific War.

== History ==
Construction of the large-sized Minekaze-class destroyers was authorized as part of the Imperial Japanese Navy's 8-4 Fleet Program from fiscal 1917–1920, as an accompaniment to the medium-sized Momi class, with which they shared many common design characteristics. Equipped with powerful engines, these vessels were capable of high speeds and were intended as escorts for the projected Amagi-class battlecruisers, which were ultimately never built. Hokaze, built at the Maizuru Naval Arsenal, was the twelfth ship of this class, and the final built before the change in design which can be designated the Nokaze sub-class. The destroyer was laid down on 30 November 1920, launched on 12 July 1921 and commissioned on 21 December 1921.

On completion, Hokaze was teamed with sister ships Hakaze, Akikaze, and Tachikaze at the Yokosuka Naval District to form Destroyer Division 4 under Torpedo Squadron 1 (第1水雷戦隊). In 1938–1939, the division was assigned to patrols of the northern and central China coastlines in support of Japanese combat operations in the Second Sino-Japanese War

=== World War II history ===
In World War II, Hokaze performed patrol and convoy escort duties. At the time of the attack on Pearl Harbor, Destroyer Division 3 reported to Carrier Division 4. From end November to mid-December, Hokaze escorted the aircraft carrier Taiyō from Sasebo to Takao, Palau and back to Tokuyama anchorage of the Kure Naval District.

In early 1942, although Destroyer Division 3 was deactivated, Hokaze continued to work under Carrier Division 4 to escort the aircraft carrier Shōhō to Truk, where the destroyer remained as part of that carrier's escort. In April, Hokaze was assigned directly to the IJN 5th Fleet as escort for the cruiser Nachi.

From the end of May, Hokaze was assigned to northern operations from Ōminato Guard District, escorting the Kiska Invasion transports. In August 1944, Hokaze escorted the seaplane tender Kimikawa Maru to Kiska, returning to Yokosuka in October for re-supply. From October, Hokaze was assigned to the Southwest Area Fleet, escorting convoys between Moji and Taiwan.

In March 1943, Hokaze was repaired and a sonar installed. She returned to convoy escort duties from April, based out of Balikpapan, Borneo, in the Netherlands East Indies. On 1 July 1943, Hokaze, the sole escort for a three-ship convoy, was torpedoed by the submarine USS Thresher in Makassar Strait, suffering moderate damage. Two of the ships in the convoy, a tanker and a freighter, were also hit. Hokaze was still functional, and after emergency repairs, escorted a convoy from Surabaya back to Yokosuka, where the ship was dry docked for additional repairs.

Repairs were completed by mid-November 1943, and Hokaze was assigned to the 1st Surface Escort Division of the General Escort Command. In March 1944, she escorted a convoy of transports from Yokosuka to Qingdao in China, where she was reassigned to the IJN 9th Fleet. In April 1944, Hokaze was dispatched from Yokosuka for western New Guinea to join the Fourth Southern Expeditionary Fleet under the overall command of the Southwest Area Fleet. On 2 July 1944, Hokaze departed Ambon in the role of a “Tokyo Express” high speed armed transport to take critically needed emergency supplies to New Guinea.

On 6 July 1944, Hokaze was torpedoed and sunk by the submarine USS Paddle in the Celebes Sea at position 03°24′N 125°28′E off Sangir Island, 105 miles north-northeast of Menado. A number of crewmen survived, but Hokaze's captain, Lieutenant Commander Eiichi Someya, perished with his ship.

On 10 September 1944 Hokaze was removed from the navy list.
