= Kuninori Marumo =

Japanese vice admiral (1891–1985)

- 丸茂 邦則
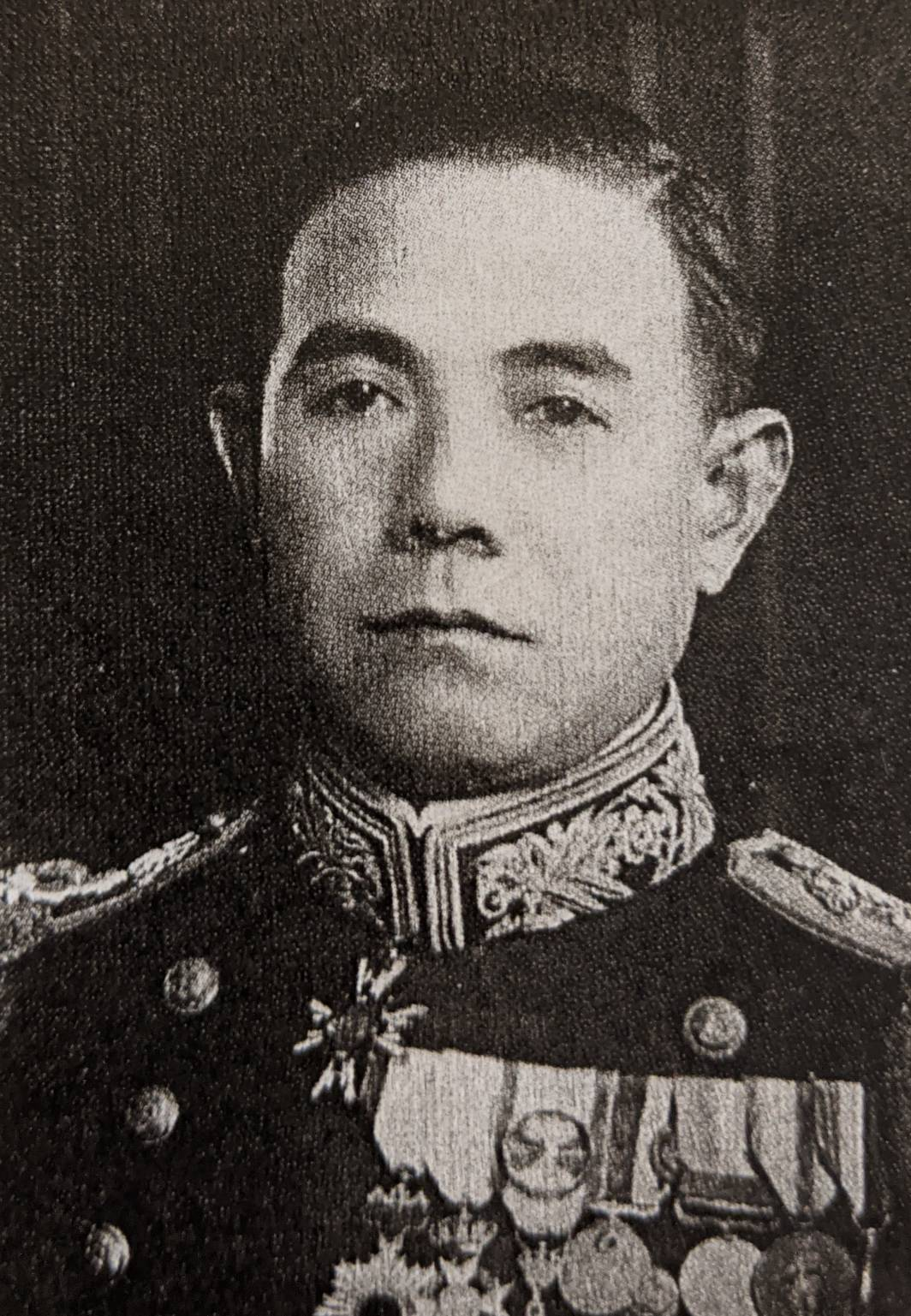
- Born: October 2, 1891; Nagano, Japan
- Died: June 24, 1985 (aged 93)
- Education: Imperial Japanese Naval Academy
- Military career
- Allegiance: Empire of Japan
- Branch: Imperial Japanese Navy
- Service years: 1912–1947
- Rank: Vice admiral
- Units: Soya, Kashima, Mikasa, Aki, Second Special Task Fleet, Tone, Okikaze, Tachikaze, Nisshin, Ise Hyūga, Yakumo, Yamashiro, Kako, Kure Naval District, IJN 4th Fleet
- Commands: Ashigara; Cruiser Division 18
- Conflicts: World War I; World War II; Battle of the Coral Sea
- Other work: Naval attaché

Kuninori Marumo (丸茂 邦則, Marumo Kuninori; October 2, 1891 – June 24, 1985) was a vice admiral in the Imperial Japanese Navy during World War II.

== Biography ==
Marumo was a native of Nagano Prefecture. He graduated from the 40th class of the Imperial Japanese Naval Academy in 1912, ranking 47th out of 144 cadets.

As a midshipman, Marumo served on the cruiser Soya and battleship Kashima, and as an ensign, on the battleship Mikasa. After completion of his torpedo and naval artillery training, he was assigned to the battleship Aki.

In 1917, Marumo was assigned to the second Special Task Fleet under Admiral Kozo Sato, a task force of Japanese destroyers deployed to Malta in the Mediterranean as part of Japan’s assistance to the Allied war effort under the Anglo-Japanese Alliance. After his return to Japan in 1918, he was promoted to lieutenant and assigned to the protected cruiser Tone. In 1921, he became chief gunnery officer on the destroyer Okikaze, and later that year was made executive officer on destroyer Tachikaze. He subsequently served as chief gunnery officer on the armored cruiser Nisshin and battleships Ise and Hyūga. After his promotion to lieutenant commander in 1924, he was assigned to the armored cruiser Yakumo, battleship Yamashiro and heavy cruiser Kako. In 1929, he made commander, and joined the Imperial Japanese Navy General Staff in a number of shore assignments. He served as a military attaché to the United States and Europe from December 1933-July 1934.

In December 1937, Marumo was given his first (and only) command: the heavy cruiser Ashigara. From 1938-1939, he was assigned to the Kure Naval District. Marumo was promoted to rear admiral in November 1939.

After the start of the Pacific War, Marumo was on the staff of the IJN 4th Fleet. He commanded the Support Group during the Battle of the Coral Sea.

From December 1942, Marumo was assigned as naval attaché to Manchukuo, where he spent most of the remainder of the war. He was promoted to vice admiral in November 1943. Repatriated to Japan in July 1947, Marumo lived in retirement until his death in 1985.
