= Japanese destroyer Tachikaze (1921) =

Destroyer of the Imperial Japanese Navy

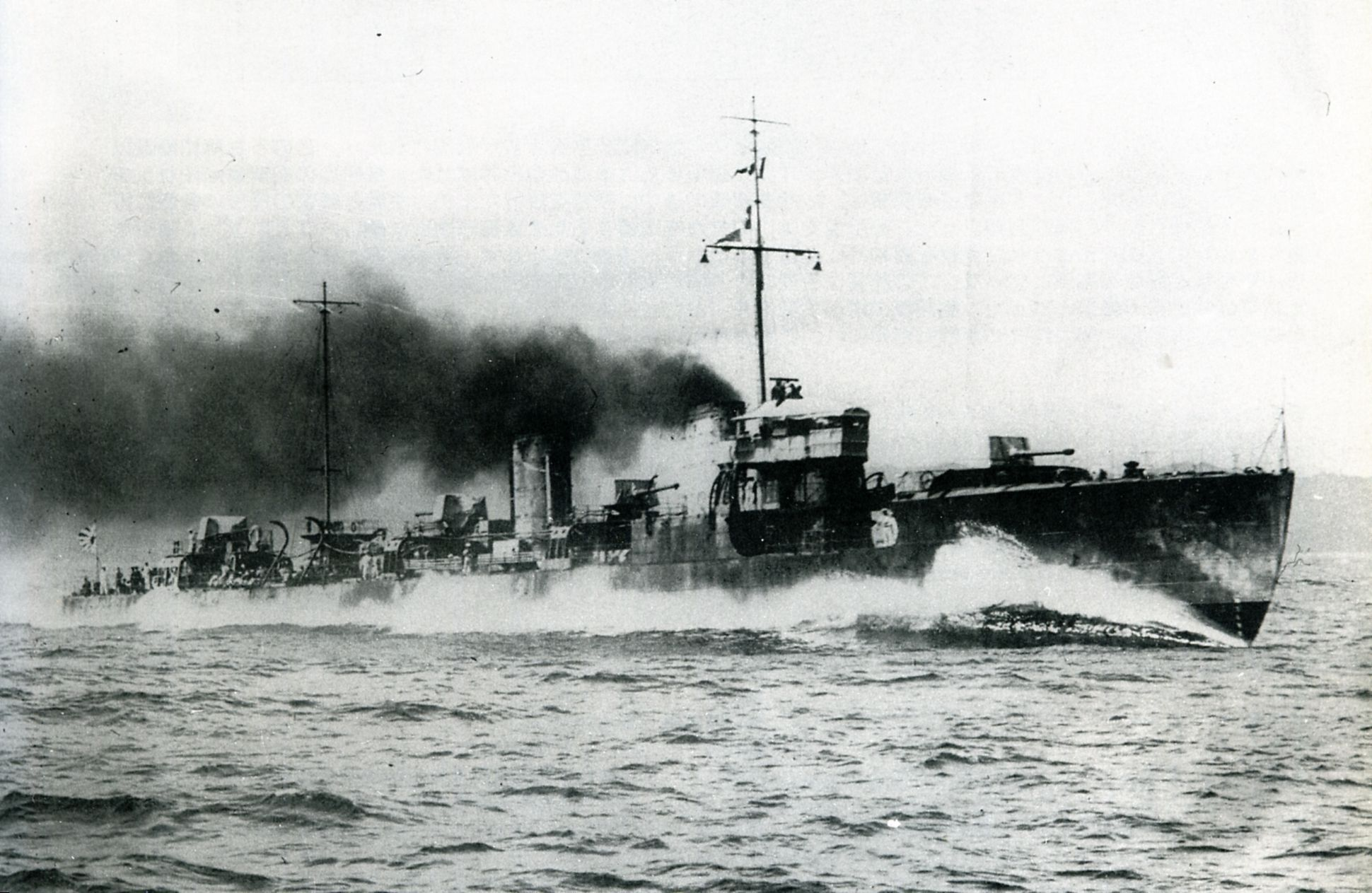
- Tachikaze on speed trials off Maizuru, 1921

History

Empire of Japan
- Name: Tachikaze
- Ordered: fiscal 1918
- Builder: Maizuru Naval Arsenal
- Laid down: 18 August 1920
- Launched: 31 March 1921
- Commissioned: 5 December 1921
- Stricken: 31 March 1944
- Fate: Sunk in action, 17 February 1944

General characteristics
- Class & type: Minekaze-class destroyer
- Displacement: 1,215 long tons (1,234 t) normal, 1,345 long tons (1,367 t) full load
- Length: 97.5 m (320 ft) pp, 102.6 m (337 ft) overall
- Beam: 8.92 m (29.3 ft)
- Draught: 2.79 m (9.2 ft)
- Propulsion: 2-shaft Mitsubishi-Parsons geared turbines, 4 boilers 38,500 ihp (28,700 kW)
- Speed: 39 knots (72 km/h)
- Range: 3,600 nautical miles (6,700 km) at 14 knots (26 km/h)
- Complement: 154
- Armament: 4 × Type 3 120 mm 45 caliber naval gun; 6 × 21 in (533 mm) torpedo tubes; 2 × 7.7 mm machine guns; 20 × naval mines

Service record
- Operations: Second Sino-Japanese War; Pacific War

Tachikaze (太刀風, Sword Wind) was a Minekaze-class destroyer, built for the Imperial Japanese Navy immediately following World War I. Advanced for their time, these ships served as first-line destroyers through the 1930s, but were considered obsolescent by the start of the Pacific War.

== History ==
Construction of the large-sized Minekaze-class destroyers was authorized as part of the Imperial Japanese Navy's 8-4 Fleet Program from fiscal 1917–1920, as an accompaniment to the medium-sized Momi class with which they shared many common design characteristics. Equipped with powerful engines, these vessels were capable of high speeds and were intended as escorts for the projected Amagi-class battlecruisers, which were ultimately never built. Tachikaze, built at the Maizuru Naval Arsenal, was the eleventh ship of this class. The destroyer was laid down on 18 August 1920, launched on 31 March 1921 and commissioned on 5 December 1921.

On completion, Tachikaze was teamed with sister ships Hakaze, Akikaze, and Hokaze at the Yokosuka Naval District to form Destroyer Division 4 under Torpedo Squadron 1 (第1水雷戦隊). In 1938-1939, the division was assigned to patrols of the central China coastline in support of Japanese efforts in the Second Sino-Japanese War. Tachikaze also served on detached duty in support of the Japanese Invasion of French Indochina in 1940.

=== World War II history ===
In World War II, Tachikaze performed patrol and convoy escort duties. At the time of the attack on Pearl Harbor, Tachikaze (assigned to Destroyer Division 34 of the 11th Air Fleet) was based at Takao, and provided air sea rescue support for the Japanese invasion of the Philippines, and escort of convoys to Davao and Balikpapan in the Netherlands East Indies.

From 27 February to the end of March 1942, Tachikaze was based at Staring-baai, escorting shipping between Sulawesi and Singapore. The destroyer assisted in the Invasion of the Andaman Islands in April, returning to Maizuru for repairs at the end of the month. From June to the end of 1942, Tachikaze was based at Jaluit Atoll or Rabaul, escorting transports in the Marshall Islands and Solomon Islands. The ship was heavily damaged in an air raid on 27 December at Rabaul, during which, Lieutenant Commander Yasumi Hirasata, commander of Tachikaze was killed.

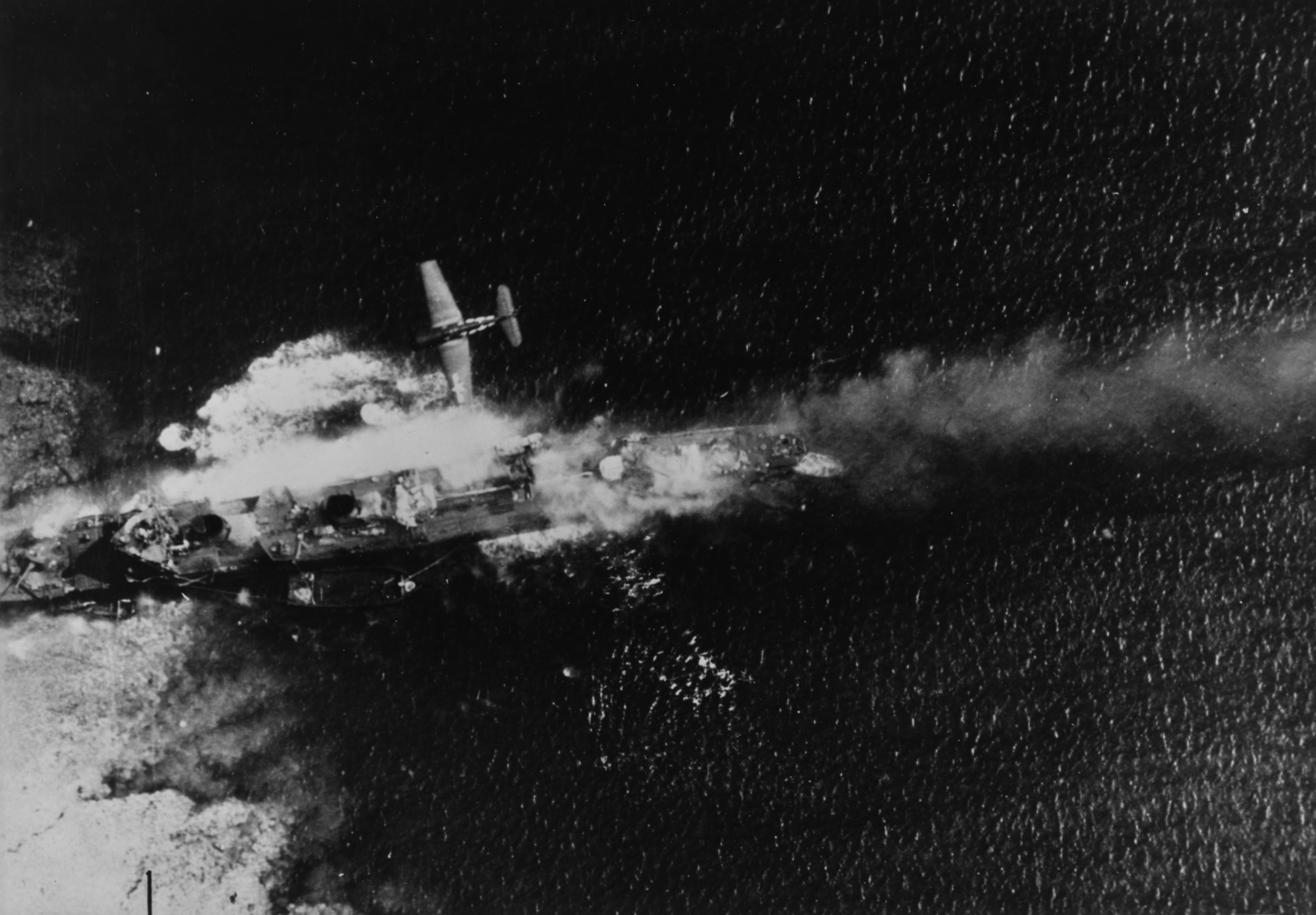
A VF-9 F6F over the stranded Tachikaze during Operation Hailstone, February 1944.

In early 1943, after emergency repairs by the repair ship Yamabiko Maru, Tachikaze returned to Maizuru, which were completed by 10 March. Tachikaze returned to Rabaul to resume patrols. She was lightly damaged by an air raid on Wewak on 15 April. She returned again to Maizuru for repairs in May, remaining until September. From October until the end of the year, Tachikaze was based at Truk, with her patrol area extending from Palau towards Rabaul.

On 4 February 1944, Tachikaze ran aground at Kuop Atoll near Truk Lagoon while returning from Rabaul, and remained stranded there despite efforts to free her. During the Allied Operation Hailstone 17 – 18 February, Tachikaze suffered heavy strafing followed by a torpedo hit in the engine room, which sank the ship by the stern at 07°03′N 151°56′E.

On 31 March 1944 Tachikaze was removed from the navy list.
