= Japanese destroyer Matsukaze (1923) =

Destroyer of the Imperial Japanese Navy

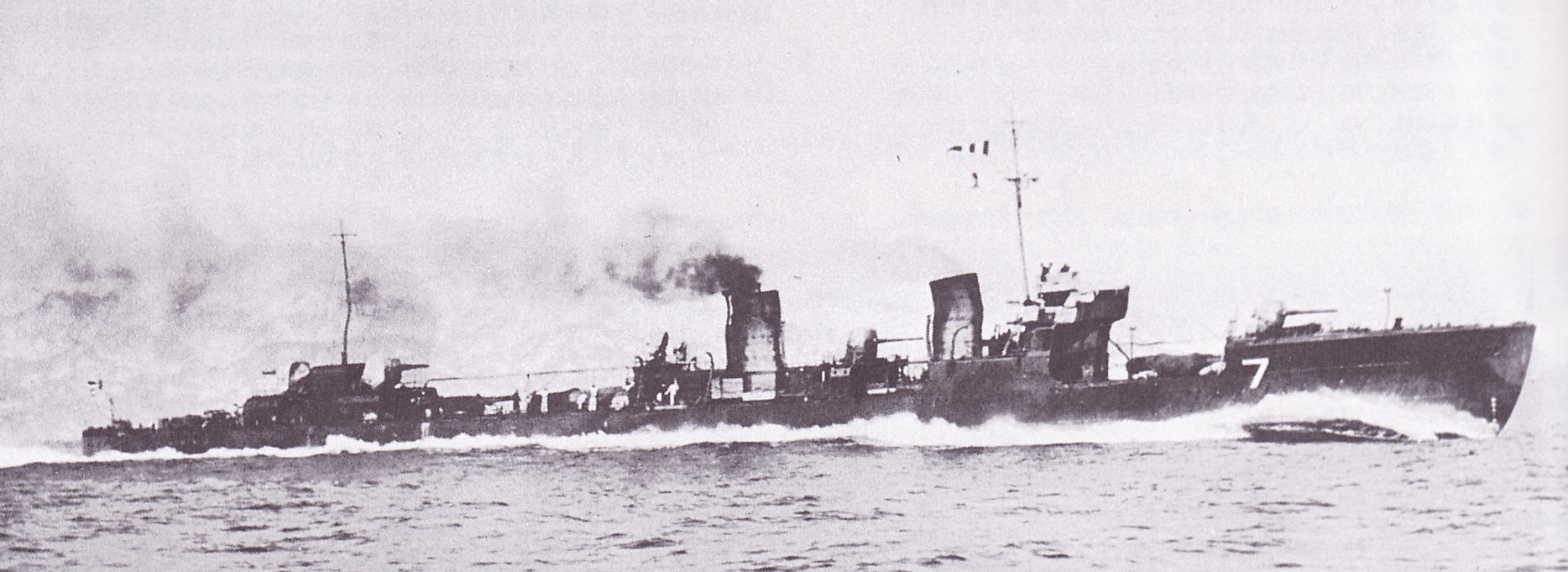
- Matsukaze on speed trials off Maizuru, 1924.

History

Empire of Japan
- Name: Matsukaze
- Builder: Maizuru Naval Arsenal
- Laid down: 2 December 1922 as Destroyer No. 7
- Launched: 30 October 1923
- Completed: 5 April 1924
- Renamed: Matsukaze, 1 August 1928
- Stricken: 10 August 1944
- Fate: Sunk on 9 June 1944

General characteristics
- Class & type: Kamikaze-class destroyer
- Displacement: 1,422 t (1,400 long tons) (normal); 1,747 t (1,719 long tons) (deep load)
- Length: 97.5 m (319 ft 11 in) (pp); 102.5 m (336 ft 3 in) (o/a)
- Beam: 9.1 m (29 ft 10 in)
- Draft: 2.9 m (9 ft 6 in)
- Installed power: 38,500 shp (28,700 kW); 4 × Kampon water-tube boilers
- Propulsion: 2 shafts; 2 × Kampon geared steam turbines
- Speed: 37.3 knots (69.1 km/h; 42.9 mph)
- Range: 3,600 nmi (6,700 km; 4,100 mi) at 14 knots (26 km/h; 16 mph)
- Complement: 148
- Armament: 4 × single 12 cm (4.7 in) Type 3 guns; 3 × twin 53.3 cm (21.0 in) torpedo tubes

Service record
- Operations: Battle of the Philippines; Battle of Sunda Strait; Solomon Islands Campaign

The Japanese destroyer Matsukaze (松風, "Pine Wind") was one of nine Kamikaze-class destroyers built for the Imperial Japanese Navy (IJN) during the 1920s. During the Pacific War, she participated in the Philippines Campaign in December 1941 and the Dutch East Indies Campaign in early 1942. She took part in the Battle of Sunda Strait in March before beginning escort duties in Southeast Asia that lasted until mid-1943.

== Design and description ==
The Kamikaze class was an improved version of the Minekaze-class destroyers. The ships had an overall length of 102.5 meters (336 ft 3 in) and were 97.5 meters (319 ft 11 in) between perpendiculars. They had a beam of 9.1 meters (29 ft 10 in), and a mean draft of 2.9 meters (9 ft 6 in). The Kamikaze-class ships displaced 1,422 metric tons (1,400 long tons) at standard load and 1,747 metric tons (1,719 long tons) at deep load. They were powered by two Parsons geared steam turbines, each driving one propeller shaft, using steam provided by four Kampon water-tube boilers. The turbines were designed to produce 38,500 shaft horsepower (28,700 kW), which would propel the ships at 37.3 knots (69.1 km/h; 42.9 mph). During her sea trials, Matsukaze comfortably exceeded her designed speed, reaching 39.2 knots (72.6 km/h; 45.1 mph). The ships carried 420 metric tons (413 long tons) of fuel oil which gave them a range of 3,600 nautical miles (6,700 km; 4,100 mi) at 14 knots (26 km/h; 16 mph). Their crew consisted of 148 officers and crewmen.

The main armament of the Kamikaze-class ships consisted of four 12-centimeter (4.7 in) Type 3 guns in single mounts; one gun forward of the superstructure, one between the two funnels and the last pair back to back atop the aft superstructure. The guns were numbered '1' to '4' from front to rear. The ships carried three above-water twin sets of 53.3-centimeter (21.0 in) torpedo tubes; one mount was between the forward superstructure and the forward gun and the other two were between the aft funnel and aft superstructure.

Early in the war, the No. 4 gun and the aft torpedo tubes were removed in exchange for four depth charge throwers and 18 depth charges. In addition 10 license-built 25 mm (0.98 in) Type 96 light AA guns were installed. These changes increased their displacement to 1,499 long tons (1,523 t). Survivors had their light AA armament augmented to be between thirteen and twenty 25 mm guns and four 13.2 mm (0.5 in) Type 93 anti-aircraft machineguns by June 1944. These changes reduced their speed to 35 knots (65 km/h; 40 mph).

== Construction and career ==
Matsukaze, built at the Maizuru Naval Arsenal, was laid down on 2 December 1922, launched on 30 October 1923 and commissioned on 5 April 1924. Originally commissioned simply as Destroyer No. 7, the ship was assigned the name Matsukaze on 1 August 1928.

=== Pacific War ===
At the time of the attack on Pearl Harbor on 7 December 1941, Matsukaze was assigned to Destroyer Division 5 of Desron 5 in the IJN 3rd Fleet, and deployed from Mako Guard District in the Pescadores as part of the Japanese invasion force for the Operation M (the invasion of the Philippines), during which time it helped screen landings of Japanese forces at Lingayen Gulf.

In early 1942, Harukaze was assigned to escorting troop convoys from Taiwan to Malaya and French Indochina. Assigned to Operation J (the invasion of Java in the Netherlands East Indies), she participated at the Battle of Sunda Strait on 1 March 1942. During that battle, the ship assisted the destroyer Shiokaze in sinking the Dutch auxiliary minesweeper Endeh

From 10 March 1942 through the end of March 1943, Matsukaze and Destroyer Division 5 were assigned to the Southwest Area Fleet and escorted troop convoy from Singapore to Penang, Rangoon, French Indochina, and Makassar. On 31 March Matsukaze returned to Yokosuka Naval Arsenal for refit.

From June 1943, Matsukaze was reassigned to the IJN 8th Fleet and sent to Rabaul at the end of June. From June through September, she made several "Tokyo Express" troop transport runs to Kolombangara and participated in the evacuation of Japanese forces from Vella Lavella in October. At the end of October, Matsukaze returned to Yokosuka for repairs.

On 9 December 1943, Matsukaze returned to Rabaul and continued to make numerous "Tokyo Express" runs throughout the Solomon Islands, especially to New Britain through the end of January. Matsukaze had the misfortune to be at Truk on 17–18 February 1944 during Operation Hailstorm, when the United States Navy launched a massive and crippling air raid on the Japanese fleet. Matsukaze escaped with medium damage caused by near misses and strafing attacks, and returned to Yokosuka via Saipan and Hahajima by 1 March for repairs.

After repairs were completed by May 1944 Matsukaze was reassigned to Destroyer Division 30 of Desron 3 in the Central Pacific Area Fleet for convoy escort between the Japanese home islands and Saipan. On 9 June 1944, after departing with a convoy from Tateyama, Chiba bound for Saipan, she was torpedoed and sunk on 9 June 70 miles (110 km) northeast of Chichijima, Ogasawara Islands at coordinates 26°59′N 143°13′E by the submarine USS Swordfish. The ship was struck from the Navy List on 10 August 1944.
