= Japanese destroyer Shiokaze =

Destroyer of the Imperial Japanese Navy

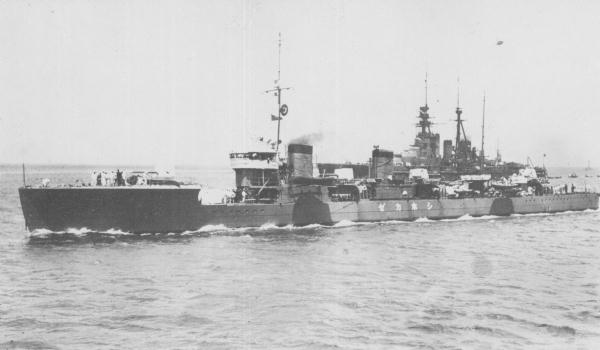
- Shiokaze with the battlecruiser Kongō in 1924.

History

Empire of Japan
- Name: Shiokaze
- Ordered: 1918 fiscal year
- Builder: Maizuru Naval Arsenal
- Laid down: 15 May 1920
- Launched: 22 October 1920
- Commissioned: 29 July 1921
- Stricken: 5 October 1945
- Fate: Scuttled

General characteristics
- Class & type: Minekaze-class destroyer
- Displacement: 1,215 long tons (1,234 t) normal, 1,345 long tons (1,367 t) full load
- Length: 97.5 m (320 ft) pp, 102.6 m (337 ft) overall
- Beam: 8.92 m (29.3 ft)
- Draught: 2.79 m (9.2 ft)
- Propulsion: 2-shaft Mitsubishi-Parsons geared turbines, 4 boilers 38,500 ihp (28,700 kW)
- Speed: 39 knots (72 km/h)
- Range: 3,600 nautical miles (6,700 km) at 14 knots (26 km/h)
- Complement: 154
- Armament: 4 × Type 3 120 mm 45 caliber naval gun; 6 × 21 in (533 mm) torpedo tubes; 2 × 7.7 mm machine guns; 20 × naval mines

Service record
- Operations: Second Sino-Japanese War; Pacific War

Shiokaze (汐風, Tide Wind) was a Minekaze-class destroyer, built for the Imperial Japanese Navy immediately following World War I. Advanced for their time, these ships served as first-line destroyers through the 1930s, but were considered obsolescent by the start of the Pacific War.

== History ==
Construction of the large-sized Minekaze-class destroyers was authorized as part of the Imperial Japanese Navy's 8-4 Fleet Program from fiscal 1917-1920, as an accompaniment to the medium-sized Momi class with which they shared many common design characteristics. Equipped with powerful engines, these vessels were capable of high speeds and were intended as escorts for the projected Amagi-class battlecruisers, which were ultimately never built. Shiokaze, built at the Maizuru Naval Arsenal, was the eighth ship of this class. The ship was laid down on 15 May 1920, launched on 22 October 1920 and commissioned on 29 July 1921.

On completion, Shiokaze was assigned to the Yokosuka Naval District. On 9 March 1928 she was conducting torpedo launch trials off Yokosuka Bay when she collided with the submarine I-21, which was at sea carrying out speed trials. There were no casualties aboard either ship, but both vessels suffered light damage; I-21′s bow was bent 60 degrees to starboard, forcing her to proceed to Yokosuka for repairs.

In 1938 and 1939, Shiokaze conducted patrols of the southern coastline of China in support of Japanese combat operations in the Second Sino-Japanese War.

=== World War II history ===
In World War II, Shiokaze performed patrol and convoy escort duties. At the time of the attack on Pearl Harbor, Shiokaze (assigned to Destroyer Division 3 of the IJN 1st Air Fleet) was based at Palau, as part of the escort of the aircraft carrier Ryūjō for "Operation M" (the Japanese invasion of the Philippines).

From early January 1942, Shiokaze was based at Cam Ranh Bay, French Indochina supporting the invasions of the British protectorate of Sarawak on Borneo, "Operation L" (the invasion of Palembang) and "Operation J" (the invasion of Java) in the Netherlands East Indies. On 2 March 1942 she assisted Matsukaze in sinking the Dutch auxiliary minesweeper Endeh. Later in March, she participated with Ryūjō in the Invasion of the Andaman Islands and the Indian Ocean raids. On 10 April 1942, Shiokaze was reassigned to the IJN 5th Fleet and participated in "Operation AL" (the invasion of the Aleutian Islands. She was reassigned back to the Southwest Area Fleet in August, escorting convoys between Japan and Taiwan.

After repairs in early 1943, Shiokaze began escorting convoys between Japan and Manila, Singapore and Palau, continuing in this duty to the end of January 1945. She suffered minor damage on 31 January 1945 when attacked south of Taiwan attempting to evacuate aircraft crews from Aparri on Luzon, returning to Kure Naval Arsenal for repairs. However, repairs were never completed, and Shiokaze was still docked at Kure at the time of the surrender of Japan.

After the war, Shiokaze was used as a reparation vessel, evacuating demobilized Japanese troops from the Asian continent back to Japan. On 5 October 1945 Shiokaze was removed from navy list. She was later scuttled to form part of the breakwater at Onahama Port, Fukushima prefecture.
