= Japanese destroyer Yūkaze =

Destroyer of the Imperial Japanese Navy

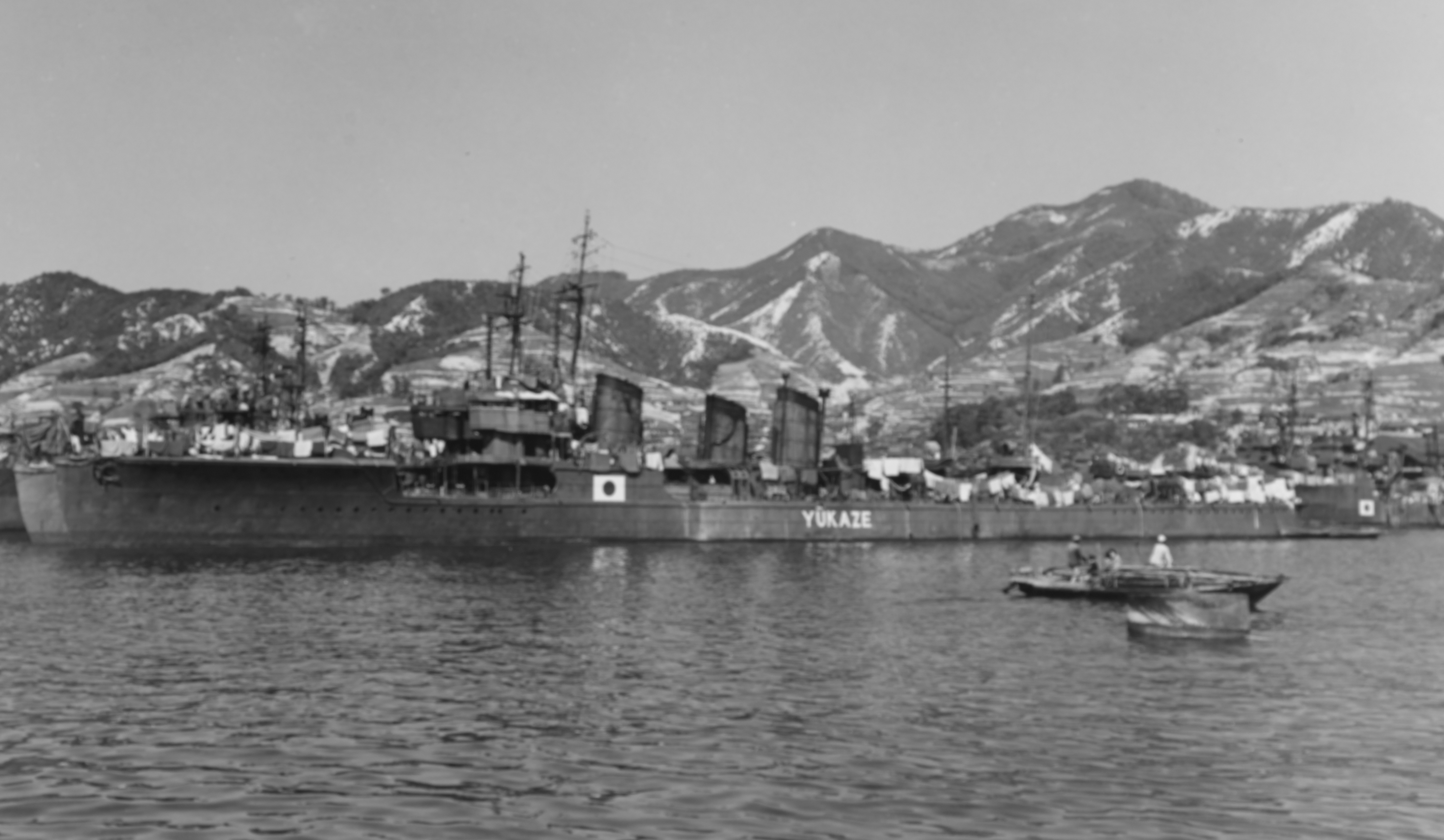
- Yūkaze anchored at Kure with other Japanese destroyers after the surrender of Japan, October 1945

History

Empire of Japan
- Name: Yūkaze
- Ordered: fiscal 1918
- Builder: Mitsubishi-Nagasaki, Japan
- Laid down: 14 December 1920
- Launched: 28 May 1921
- Commissioned: 24 August 1921
- Stricken: 5 October 1945
- Fate: Royal Navy 1947-later scrapped

General characteristics
- Class & type: Minekaze-class destroyer
- Displacement: 1,345 long tons (1,367 t) normal, 1,650 long tons (1,680 t) full load
- Length: 97.5 m (320 ft) pp, 102.6 m (337 ft) overall
- Beam: 9 m (30 ft)
- Draught: 2.8 m (9.2 ft)
- Propulsion: 2-shaft Mitsubishi-Parsons geared turbines, 4 boilers 38,500 ihp (28,700 kW)
- Speed: 39 knots (72 km/h)
- Range: 3,600 nautical miles (6,700 km) at 14 knots (26 km/h)
- Complement: 148
- Armament: 4 × Type 3 120 mm 45 caliber naval gun; 6 × 21 in (533 mm) torpedo tubes in three twin mountings; 2 × 7.7 mm machine guns

Service record
- Operations: Second Sino-Japanese War; Pacific War

Yūkaze (夕風, Evening Wind) was a Minekaze-class destroyer, built for the Imperial Japanese Navy immediately following World War I. Advanced for their time, these ships served as first-line destroyers through the 1930s, but were considered obsolescent by the start of the Pacific War.

== History ==
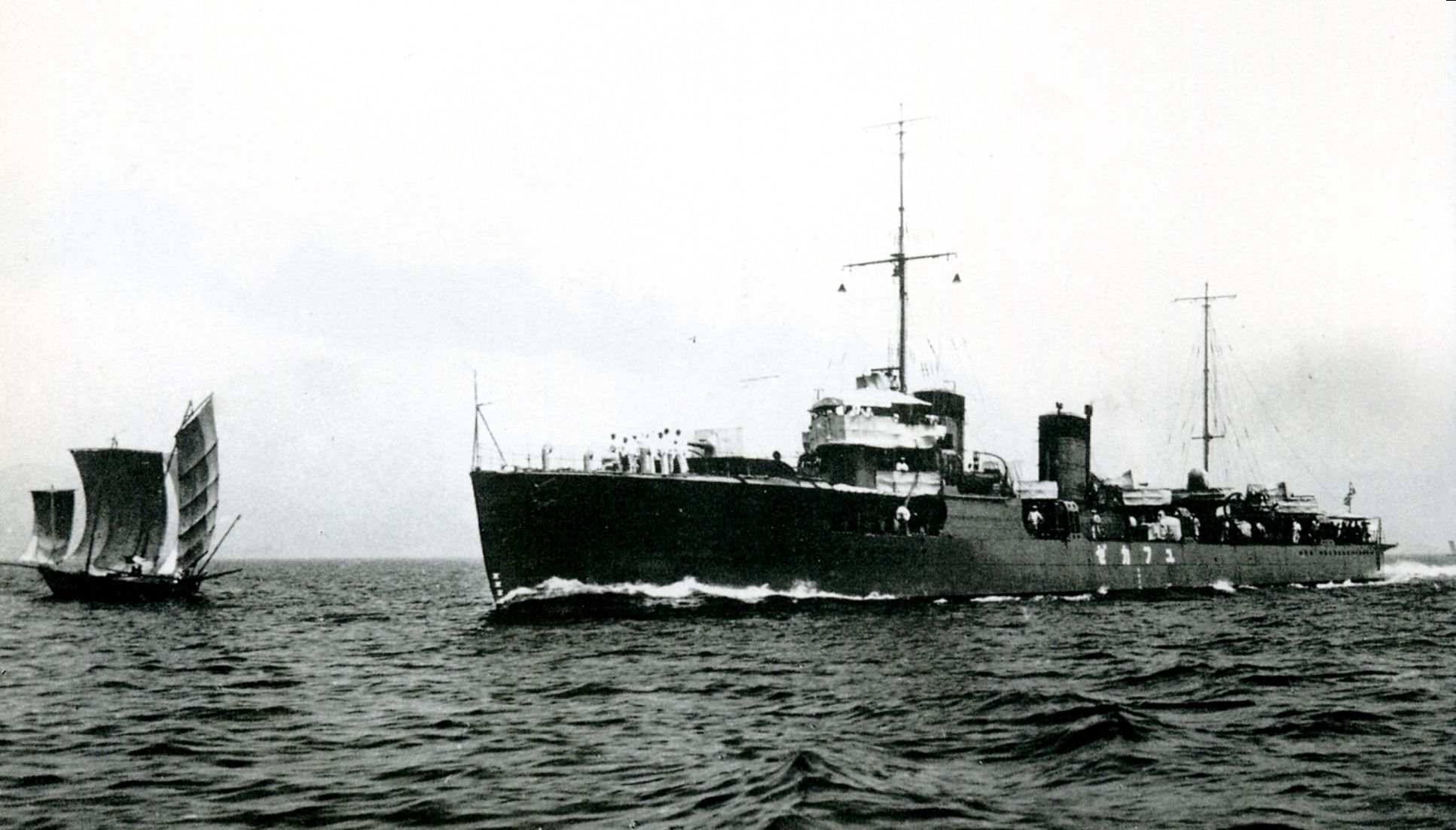
Yūkaze commissioning at Nagasaki, 1921

Construction of the large-sized Minekaze-class destroyers was authorized as part of the Imperial Japanese Navy's 8-4 Fleet Program from fiscal 1917-1920, as an accompaniment to the medium-sized Momi class with which they shared many common design characteristics. Equipped with powerful engines, these vessels were capable of high speeds and were intended as escorts for the projected Amagi-class battlecruisers, which were ultimately never built. Yūkaze, built at the Mitsubishi shipyards, Nagasaki, was the tenth ship of this class. The destroyer was laid down on 14 December 1920, launched on 28 May 1921 and commissioned on 24 August 1921.

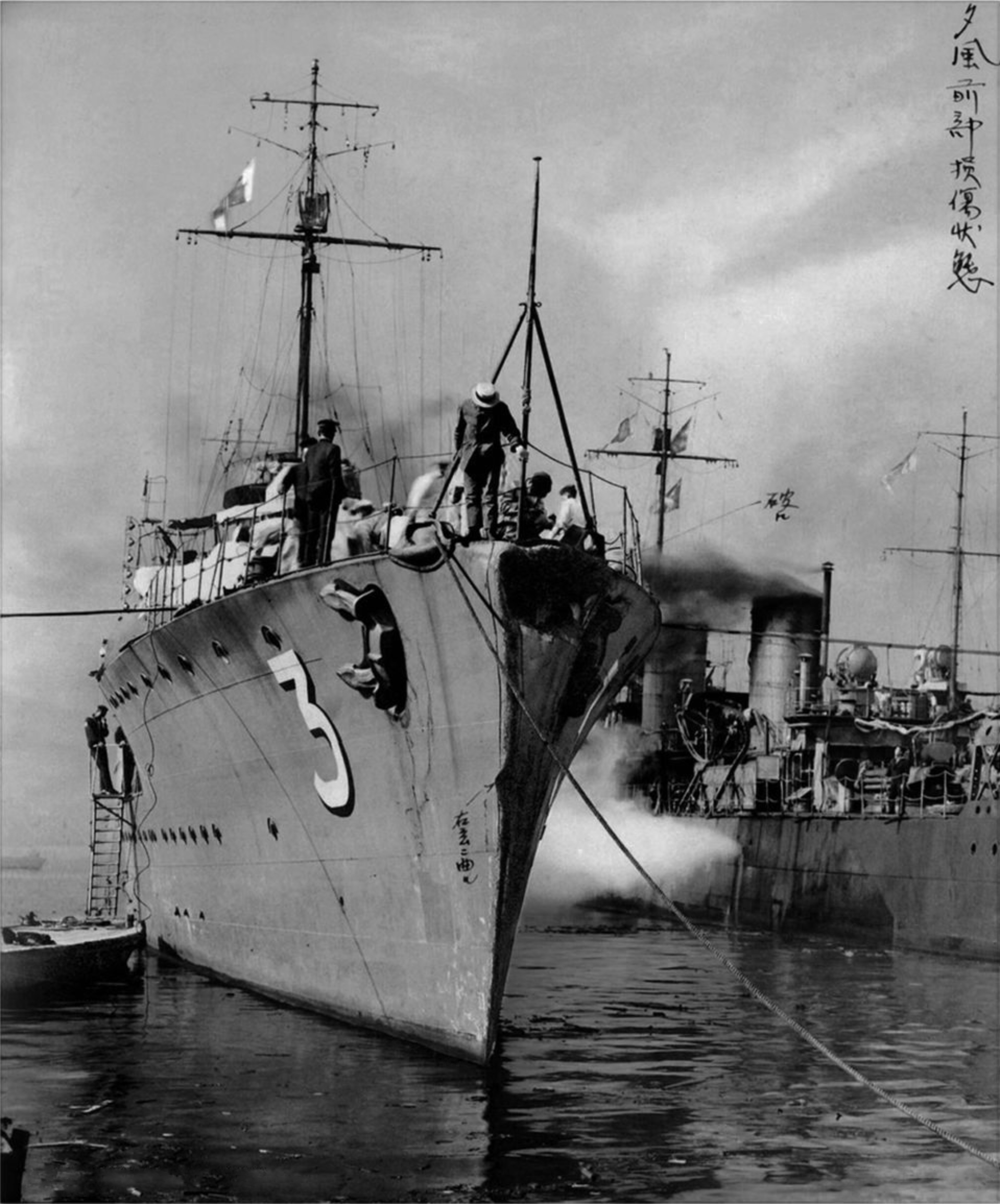
Bow of Yūkaze at Yokosuka, showing damage sustained in the collision with Shimakaze, September 12, 1928

On completion, Yūkaze was assigned to Yokosuka Naval District as part of Destroyer Division 3 under the IJN 2nd Fleet. On 11 October 1928, in Uraga Channel, while on night training maneuvers, Yūkaze collided with her sister ship Shimakaze, resulting in significant damage and requiring extensive repairs.

In 1937-1938, Yūkaze was assigned to patrols of the central China coastlines in support of Japanese efforts in the Second Sino-Japanese War

=== World War II history ===
At the time of the attack on Pearl Harbor, Yūkaze was under Carrier Division 3 in the IJN 1st Fleet based at the Kure Naval District as part of the escort for the old aircraft carrier Hōshō. As such, the destroyer participated in the Battle of Midway.

Afterwards, Hōshō was used to train naval aviators, remaining in the Inland Sea under the IJN 3rd Fleet, and Yūkaze continued to serve as the aircraft carrier's escort through the end of World War II.

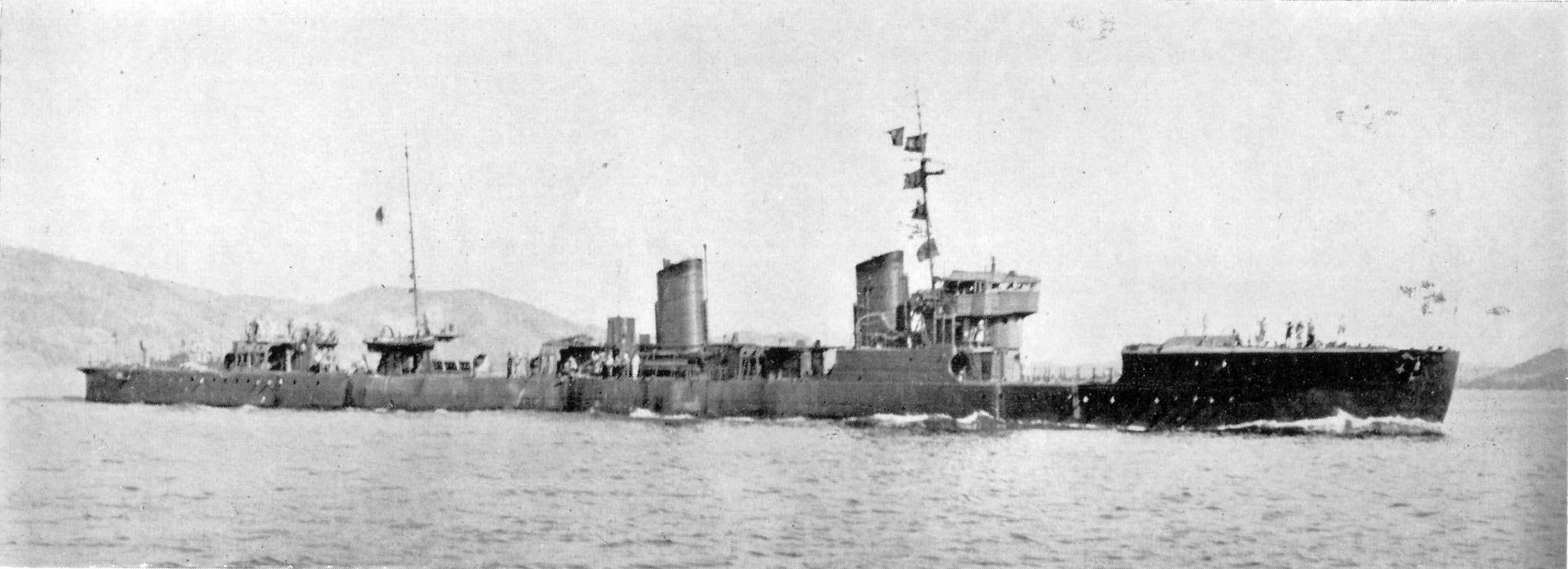
Yūkaze leaving Sasebo for Singapore, July 1947

On 5 October 1945 Yūkaze was removed from navy list.

After the war, Yūkaze was used as a repatriation vessel from October 1945 through August 1947, when the ship was turned over to the British Royal Navy as a prize of war in Singapore, where she was broken up for scrap.
