= Japanese destroyer Minekaze =

Destroyer of the Imperial Japanese Navy

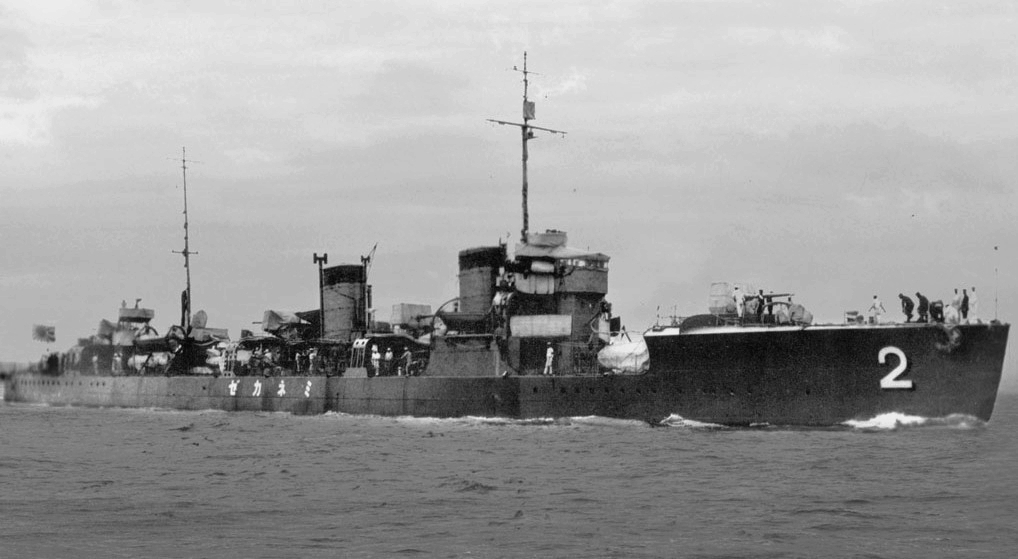
- Minekaze at Yokosuka, 30 August 1932

History

Empire of Japan
- Name: Minekaze
- Ordered: 1917 Fiscal Year
- Builder: Maizuru Naval Arsenal
- Laid down: 20 April 1918
- Launched: 8 February 1919
- Completed: 29 May 1920
- Stricken: 31 March 1944
- Fate: Sunk on 10 February 1944

General characteristics
- Class & type: Minekaze-class destroyer
- Displacement: 1,366 t (1,344 long tons) (normal); 1,676 t (1,650 long tons) (deep load)
- Length: 97.5 m (319 ft 11 in) (pp); 102.5 m (336 ft 3 in) (o/a)
- Beam: 9.04 m (29 ft 8 in)
- Draft: 2.9 m (9 ft 6 in)
- Installed power: 38,500 shp (28,700 kW); 4 × Kampon water-tube boilers
- Propulsion: 2 shafts; 2 × Kampon geared steam turbines
- Speed: 39 knots (72 km/h; 45 mph)
- Range: 3,600 nmi (6,700 km; 4,100 mi) at 14 knots (26 km/h; 16 mph)
- Complement: 148
- Armament: 4 × single 12 cm (4.7 in) Type 3 guns; 3 × twin 53.3 cm (21.0 in) torpedo tubes; 20 × mines

Service record
- Operations: Second Sino-Japanese War; Pacific War

The Japanese destroyer Minekaze (峯風, Summit Wind) was the lead ship of the Minekaze-class destroyers, built for the Imperial Japanese Navy (IJN) during the late 1910s. The ship served in the Second Sino-Japanese War during the 1930s and spent the Pacific War on escort duties in Japanese waters and the East China Sea. She was sunk by an American submarine in early 1944 near Formosa.

== Design and description ==
The Minekaze class was designed with higher speed and better seakeeping than the preceding Kawakaze-class destroyers. The ships had an overall length of 102.5 meters (336 ft 3 in) and were 94.5 meters (310 ft 0 in) between perpendiculars. They had a beam of 9.04 meters (29 ft 8 in), and a mean draft of 2.9 meters (9 ft 6 in). The Minekaze-class ships displaced 1,366 metric tons (1,344 long tons) at standard load and 1,676 metric tons (1,650 long tons) at deep load. They were powered by two Parsons geared steam turbines, each driving one propeller shaft, using steam provided by four Kampon water-tube boilers. The turbines were designed to produce 38,500 shaft horsepower (28,700 kW), which would propel the ships at 39 knots (72 km/h; 45 mph). The ships carried 401 metric tons (395 long tons) of fuel oil which gave them a range of 3,600 nautical miles (6,700 km; 4,100 mi) at 14 knots (26 km/h; 16 mph). Their crew consisted of 148 officers and crewmen.

The main armament of the Minekaze-class ships consisted of four 12-centimeter (4.7 in) Type 3 guns in single mounts; one gun forward of the superstructure, one between the two funnels, one aft of the rear funnel, and the last gun atop the aft superstructure. The guns were numbered '1' to '4' from front to rear. The ships carried three above-water twin sets of 53.3-centimeter (21.0 in) torpedo tubes; one mount was in the well deck between the forward superstructure and the forward gun and the other two were between the aft funnel and aft superstructure. They could also carry 20 mines as well as minesweeping gear.

In 1937–38, Minekaze was one of the ships that had her hull strengthened, funnel caps added and her fuel capacity reduced to 279 metric tons (275 long tons). Early in the war, Nos. 2 and 3 guns and both sets of aft torpedo tubes were removed in exchange for four depth charge throwers, 36 depth charges, and 10 license-built 25 mm (0.98 in) Type 96 light AA guns. These changes reduced their speed to 35 knots (65 km/h; 40 mph).

== Construction and career ==
Minekaze, built at the Maizuru Naval Arsenal, was the lead ship of this class. The destroyer was laid down on 20 April 1918, launched on 8 February 1919 and completed on 29 May 1920. Upon commissioning, Minekaze was teamed with sister ships Sawakaze, Okikaze, and Yakaze, at the Sasebo Naval District to form Destroyer Division 2 under the 2nd Fleet.

From 1930 to 1932, Destroyer Division 2 was assigned to the 1st Air Fleet as part of the escort of the aircraft carrier Akagi, to assist in search and rescue operations for downed aircraft. At the time of the First Shanghai Incident of 1932, Minekaze was engaged in river patrol duties along the Yangzi River in China. In 1937–38, Minekaze was assigned to patrols of the northern and central China coastlines in support of Japanese efforts in the Second Sino-Japanese War.

=== Pacific War ===
At the time of the attack on Pearl Harbor on 7 December 1941, Minekaze was based at the Chinkai Guard District in Korea, and was assigned to patrols of the Tsushima Straits and Chishima Islands coastlines. From April 1942, Minekaze was reassigned to the Sasebo Naval District for patrol and convoy escort duties. On 9 May, she assisted in the rescue of passengers from the Taiyō Maru, which had been sunk by an American submarine en route to southeast Asia with many civilian engineers and technicians. At the end of September, the destroyer escorted convoys to Saipan, Truk and Rabaul, and from the end of November 1942 to February 1944, was assigned to patrol and escort duties in the East China Sea. On 1 February 1944, Minekaze was reassigned to the 1st Surface Escort Division of the General Escort Command. Four days later, the ship departed Moji escorting a convoy bound for Takao. The convoy was spotted by the submarine USS Pogy off the east coast of Taiwan and Minekaze was torpedoed and sunk on 10 February 1944 approximately 7 miles (11 km) southeast of Wu-shih Pi, Taiwan at coordinates (23°12′N 121°30′E). On 31 March 1944, Minekaze was removed from the Navy List.
