= Japanese destroyer Okikaze =

Destroyer of the Imperial Japanese Navy

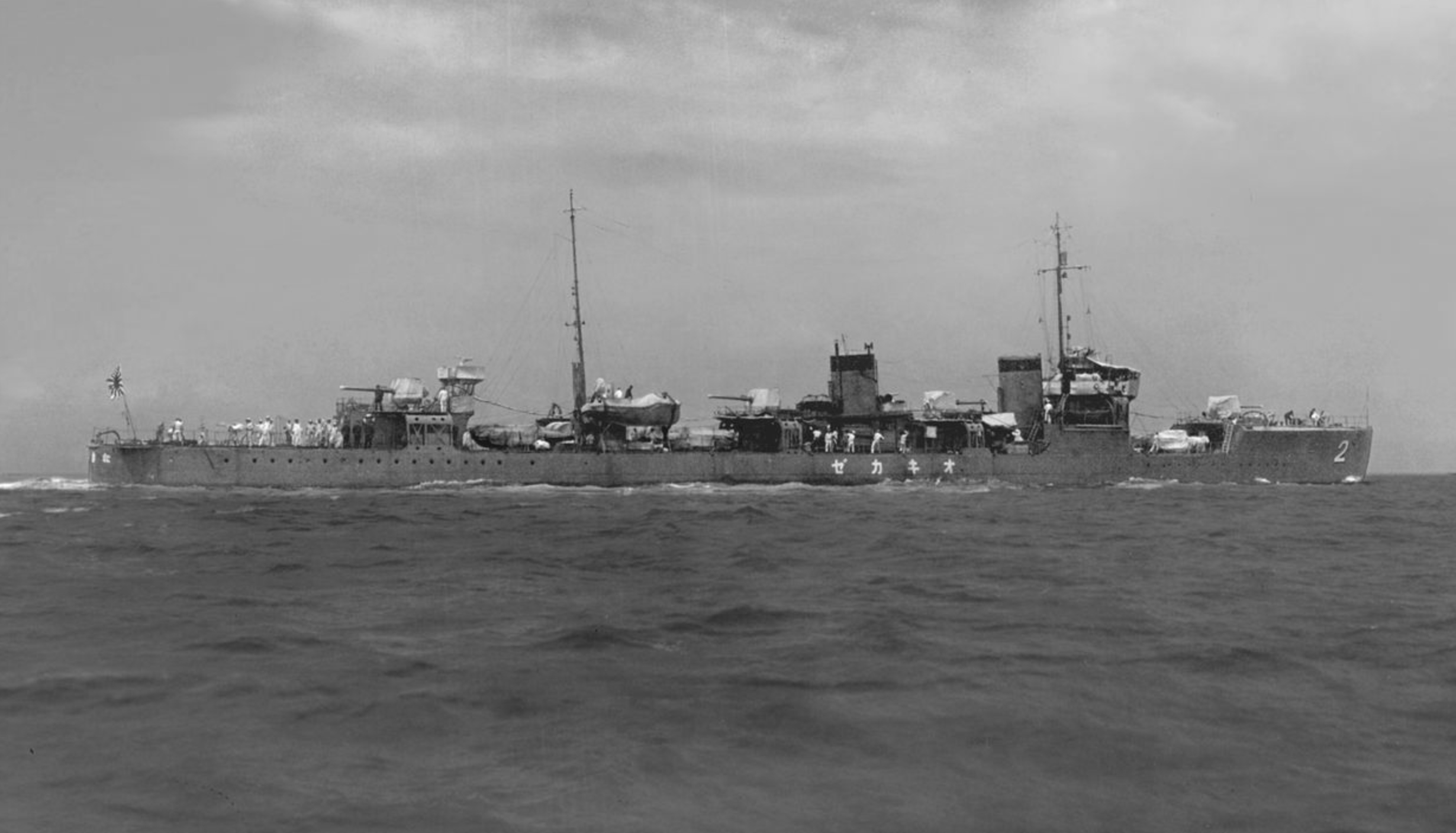
- Okikaze at Yokosuka, 1932

History

Empire of Japan
- Name: Okikaze
- Ordered: fiscal 1917
- Builder: Maizuru Naval Arsenal
- Laid down: 22 February 1919
- Launched: 3 October 1919
- Commissioned: 17 August 1920
- Stricken: 1 March 1944
- Fate: Sunk on 10 January 1943

General characteristics
- Class & type: Minekaze-class destroyer
- Displacement: 1,345 long tons (1,367 t) normal, 1,650 long tons (1,680 t) full load
- Length: 97.5 m (320 ft) pp, 102.6 m (337 ft) overall
- Beam: 9 m (30 ft)
- Draught: 2.8 m (9.2 ft)
- Propulsion: 2-shaft Mitsubishi-Parsons geared turbines, 4 boilers 38,500 ihp (28,700 kW)
- Speed: 39 knots (72 km/h)
- Range: 3,600 nautical miles (6,700 km) at 14 knots (26 km/h)
- Complement: 148
- Armament: 4 × Type 3 120 mm 45 caliber naval gun; 6 × 21 in (533 mm) torpedo tubes; 2 × 7.7 mm machine guns

Service record
- Operations: First Shanghai incident; Pacific War

The Japanese destroyer Okikaze (沖風, Offshore Wind) was one of 15 Minekaze-class destroyers built for the Imperial Japanese Navy during the late 1910s. The ship served as a plane guard and played a minor role in the First Shanghai incident during the 1930s. She spent most of the Pacific War on escort duties in Japanese waters until she was sunk by an American submarine in early 1943.

== Design and description ==
The Minekaze class was designed with higher speed and better seakeeping than the preceding Kawakaze-class destroyers. The ships had an overall length of 102.5 meters (336 ft 3 in) and were 94.5 meters (310 ft 0 in) between perpendiculars. They had a beam of 9.04 meters (29 ft 8 in), and a mean draft of 2.9 meters (9 ft 6 in). The Minekaze-class ships displaced 1,366 metric tons (1,344 long tons) at standard load and 1,676 metric tons (1,650 long tons) at deep load. They were powered by two Parsons geared steam turbines, each driving one propeller shaft, using steam provided by four Kampon water-tube boilers. The turbines were designed to produce 38,500 shaft horsepower (28,700 kW), which would propel the ships at 39 knots (72 km/h; 45 mph). The ships carried 401 metric tons (395 long tons) of fuel oil which gave them a range of 3,600 nautical miles (6,700 km; 4,100 mi) at 14 knots (26 km/h; 16 mph). Their crew consisted of 148 officers and crewmen.

The main armament of the Minekaze-class ships consisted of four 12-centimeter (4.7 in) Type 3 guns in single mounts; one gun forward of the superstructure, one between the two funnels, one aft of the rear funnel, and the last gun atop the aft superstructure. The guns were numbered '1' to '4' from front to rear. The ships carried three above-water twin sets of 53.3-centimeter (21.0 in) torpedo tubes; one mount was in the well deck between the forward superstructure and the forward gun and the other two were between the aft funnel and aft superstructure. They could also carry 20 mines as well as minesweeping gear.

In 1937–38, Okikaze was one of the ships that had her hull strengthened, funnel caps added and her fuel capacity reduced to 279 metric tons (275 long tons). Early in the war, Nos. 2 and 3 guns and both sets of aft torpedo tubes were removed in exchange for four depth charge throwers, 36 depth charges, and 10 license-built 25 mm (0.98 in) Type 96 light AA guns. These changes reduced their speed to 35 knots (65 km/h; 40 mph).

== Construction and career ==
Okikaze, built at the Maizuru Naval Arsenal, was laid down on 22 February 1919, launched on 3 October 1919 and completed on 17 August 1920. On commissioning, Okikaze was teamed with sister ships Minekaze, Sawakaze, and Yakaze at the Sasebo Naval District to form Destroyer Division 2 under the IJN 2nd Fleet.

From 1930 to 1932, Destroyer Division 2 was assigned to the IJN 1st Air Fleet as part of the escort of the aircraft carrier Akagi, to assist in search and rescue operations for downed aircraft. At the time of the First Shanghai incident of 1932, Okikaze was engaged in river patrol duties along the Yangzi River in China.

=== Pacific War ===
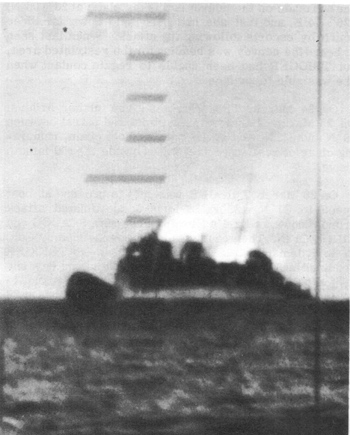
Periscope view of sinking Okikaze taken from USS Trigger, 10 January 1943

At the time of the attack on Pearl Harbor on 7 December 1941, Okikaze was based at the Ōminato Guard District in northern Japan, and was assigned to patrols of the Tsugaru Strait and the coastline of southern Hokkaidō. In April 1942, Okikaze was recalled to the Yokosuka Naval District, where it was assigned anti-submarine patrols of the entrance of Tokyo Bay for the duration of the war, making only an occasional convoy escort run along the coast of Japan to Kushimoto, Wakayama or patrols of the coast of northern Honshū through the end of 1942.

On 10 January 1943, Okikaze was torpedoed by the submarine USS Trigger just 35 miles (56 km) southeast of Yokosuka, within sight of Katsura Lighthouse at coordinates 35°02′N 140°12′E. One torpedo hit under the well deck and folded the destroyer's forecastle up at a 45° angle, and another hit Okikaze's stern. The ship sank with the loss of most crewmen, including the captain. However, Okikaze was not officially removed from the Navy List until 1 March 1944.
