= Japanese destroyer Yakaze =

Destroyer of the Imperial Japanese Navy

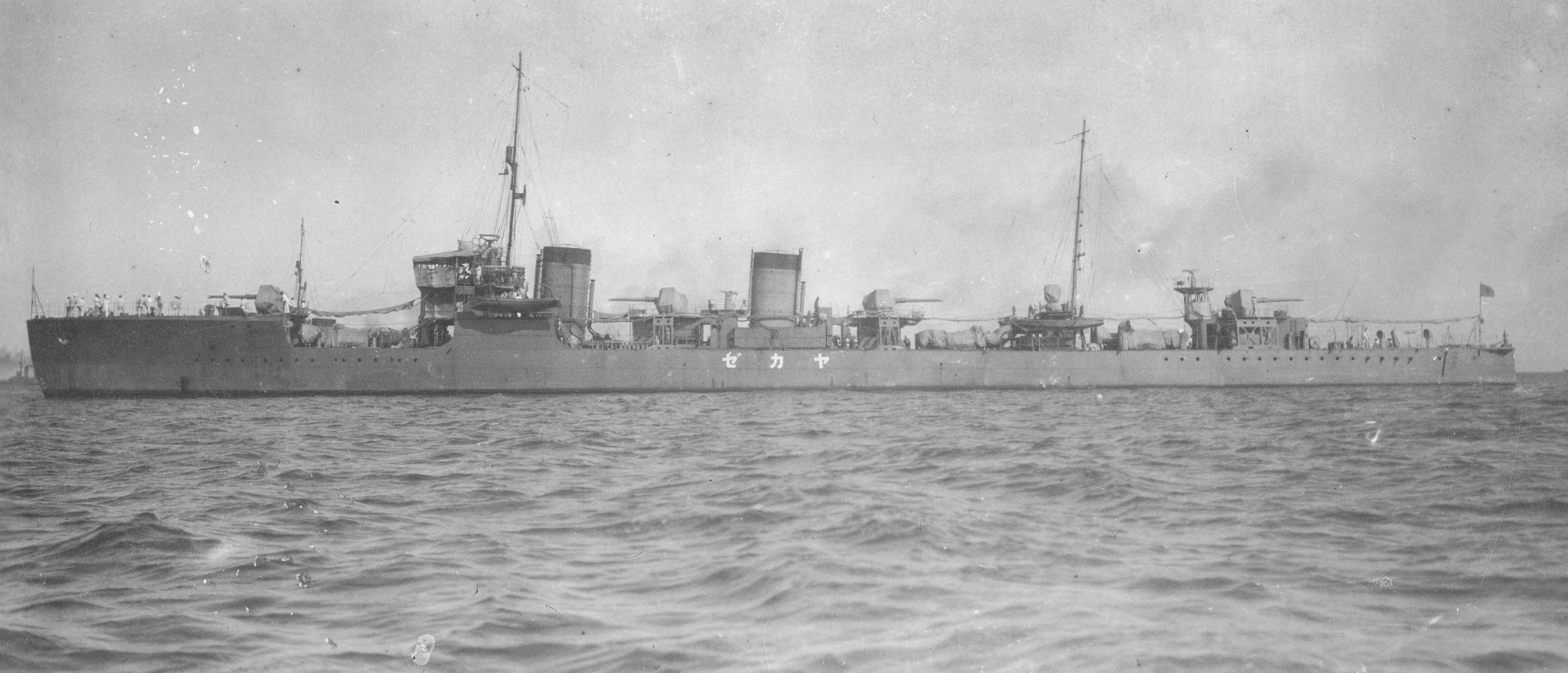
- Yakaze in July 1922.

History

Empire of Japan
- Name: Yakaze
- Ordered: 1917 fiscal year
- Builder: Mitsubishi, Nagasaki
- Laid down: 24 January 1918
- Launched: 10 April 1920
- Completed: 19 July 1920
- Commissioned: 19 July 1920
- Reclassified: As radio-controlled target ship, 20 July 1942
- Fate: Scrapped, 1948

General characteristics (As built)
- Class & type: Minekaze-class destroyer
- Displacement: 1,366 t (1,344 long tons) (normal); 1,676 t (1,650 long tons) (deep load)
- Length: 97.5 m (319 ft 11 in) (pp); 102.5 m (336 ft 3 in) (o/a)
- Beam: 9.04 m (29 ft 8 in)
- Draft: 2.9 m (9 ft 6 in)
- Installed power: 38,500 shp (28,700 kW); 4 × Kampon water-tube boilers
- Propulsion: 2 shafts; 2 × Kampon geared steam turbines
- Speed: 39 knots (72 km/h; 45 mph)
- Range: 3,600 nmi (6,700 km; 4,100 mi) at 14 knots (26 km/h; 16 mph)
- Complement: 148
- Armament: 4 × single 12 cm (4.7 in) Type 3 guns; 3 × twin 53.3 cm (21.0 in) torpedo tubes; 20 × mines

General characteristics (As target vessel)
- Displacement: 1,531 long tons (1,556 t) (full load)
- Installed power: 11,260 shp (8,400 kW)
- Speed: 24 knots (44 km/h; 28 mph)
- Armament: 1 × 5 cm (2.0 in) gun; 4 × 25 mm (0.98 in) Type 96 AA guns

Service record
- Operations: Second Sino-Japanese War

The Japanese destroyer Yakaze (矢風, Arrow Wind) was one of 15 Minekaze-class destroyers built for the Imperial Japanese Navy (IJN) during the late 1910s. A decade later, the ship served as a plane guard. During the Pacific War, she was initially as the mother ship for a remotely controlled target ship and then became a radio-controlled target ship herself in 1942. Although she was badly damaged in mid-1945, Yakaze survived the war and was scrapped in 1948.

== Design and description ==
The Minekaze class was designed with higher speed and better seakeeping than the preceding Kawakaze-class destroyers. The ships had an overall length of 102.5 meters (336 ft 3 in) and were 94.5 meters (310 ft 0 in) between perpendiculars. They had a beam of 9.04 meters (29 ft 8 in), and a mean draft of 2.9 meters (9 ft 6 in). The Minekaze-class ships displaced 1,366 metric tons (1,344 long tons) at standard load and 1,676 metric tons (1,650 long tons) at deep load. They were powered by two Parsons geared steam turbines, each driving one propeller shaft, using steam provided by four Kampon water-tube boilers. The turbines were designed to produce 38,500 shaft horsepower (28,700 kW), which would propel the ships at 39 knots (72 km/h; 45 mph). The ships carried 401 metric tons (395 long tons) of fuel oil which gave them a range of 3,600 nautical miles (6,700 km; 4,100 mi) at 14 knots (26 km/h; 16 mph). Their crew consisted of 148 officers and crewmen.

The main armament of the Minekaze-class ships consisted of four 12-centimeter (4.7 in) Type 3 guns in single mounts; one gun forward of the superstructure, one between the two funnels, one aft of the rear funnel, and the last gun atop the aft superstructure. The guns were numbered '1' to '4' from front to rear. The ships carried three above-water twin sets of 53.3-centimeter (21.0 in) torpedo tubes; one mount was in the well deck between the forward superstructure and the forward gun and the other two were between the aft funnel and aft superstructure. They could also carry 20 mines as well as minesweeping gear.

In 1937, Yakaze was converted into a radio control ship for the ex-battleship Satsuma that was serving as a target ship. As part of the conversion, her torpedo tubes were removed and her main armament was reduced to one or two 12 cm guns. On 20 July 1942, she was reclassified as a target ship for aircraft and her armament was reduced to a single 5-centimeter (2.0 in) gun and four license-built 25 mm (0.98 in) Type 96 light AA guns. Her power was reduced to 11,260 shp (8,400 kW) which cut her speed to 24 knots (44 km/h; 28 mph).

== Construction and career ==
Yakaze, built at the Mitsubishi shipyard in Nagasaki, was laid down on 15 August 1918, launched on 20 April 1920 and completed on 19 July 1920. On commissioning, Yakaze was assigned to the Kure Naval District under the IJN 2nd Fleet.

In 1931, Yakaze was teamed with sister ships Minekaze, Okikaze, and Sawakaze at Sasebo Naval District to form Destroyer Division 2 under the 1st Air Fleet as part of the escort of the aircraft carriers Akagi and Hōshō to assist in search and rescue operations for downed aircraft. At the time of the First Shanghai incident of 1932, Yakaze was engaged in river patrol duties along the Yangzi River in China. On 11 March 1939, she collided with the submarine I-61. Due to damage and flooding incurred during the Attack on Yokosuka on 18 July 1945, she is towed to Nagaura and placed in No. 2 drydock, eventually sinking due to lack of repairmen. At the time of the surrender of Japan in September 1945, the Yakaze was still bottomed. Scrapped 1947.
