= Japanese destroyer Sawakaze (1919) =

Destroyer of the Imperial Japanese Navy

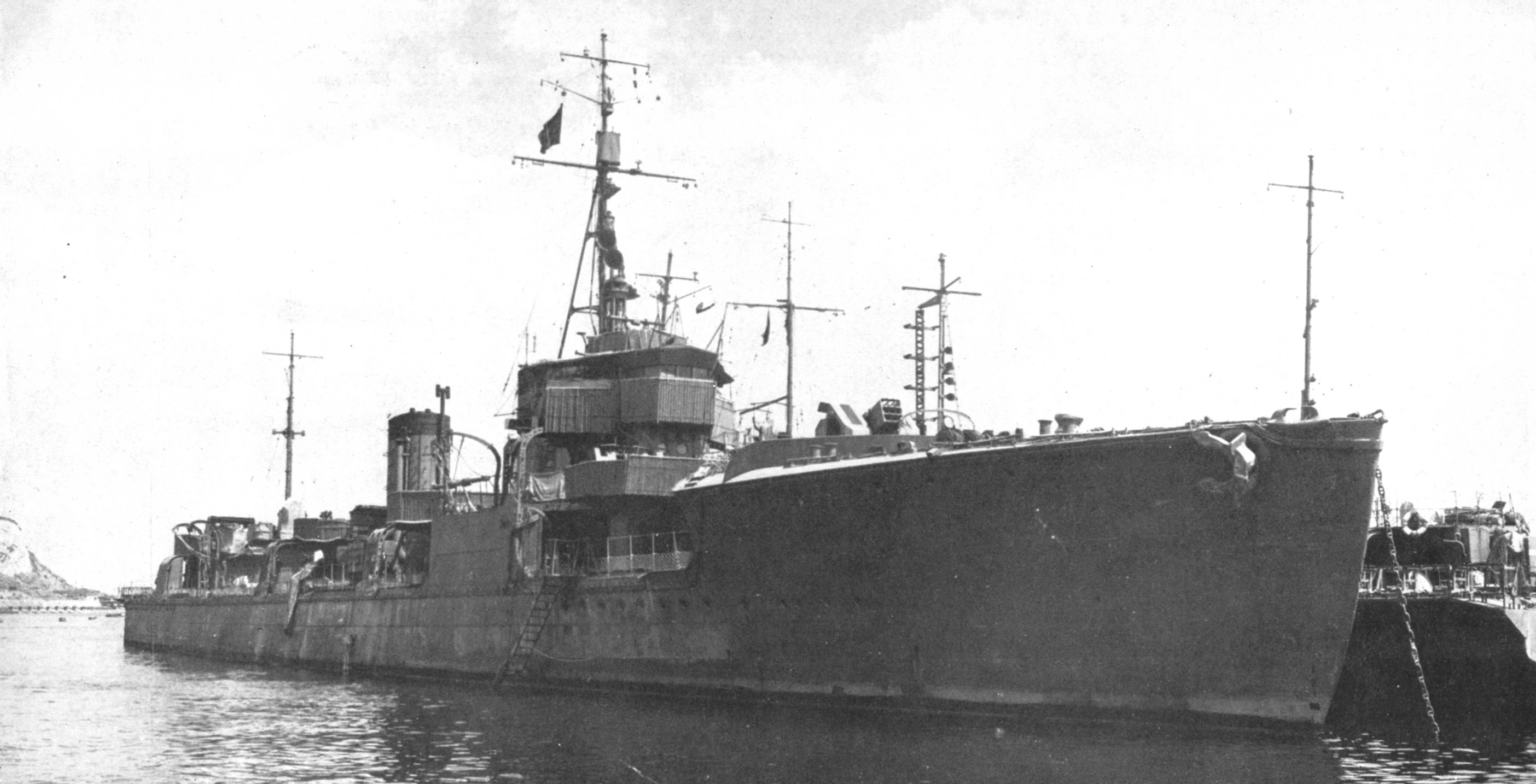
- Japanese destroyer Sawakaze in 1945

History

Empire of Japan
- Name: Sawakaze
- Ordered: 1917 fiscal year
- Builder: Mitsubishi, Nagasaki
- Laid down: 7 January 1918
- Launched: 7 January 1919
- Completed: 6 March 1920
- Stricken: 15 September 1945
- Fate: Scuttled as breakwater, 1948

General characteristics
- Class & type: Minekaze-class destroyer
- Displacement: 1,366 t (1,344 long tons) (normal); 1,676 t (1,650 long tons) (deep load)
- Length: 97.5 m (319 ft 11 in) (pp); 102.5 m (336 ft 3 in) (o/a)
- Beam: 9.04 m (29 ft 8 in)
- Draft: 2.9 m (9 ft 6 in)
- Installed power: 38,500 shp (28,700 kW); 4 × Kampon water-tube boilers
- Propulsion: 2 shafts; 2 × Kampon geared steam turbines
- Speed: 39 knots (72 km/h; 45 mph)
- Range: 3,600 nmi (6,700 km; 4,100 mi) at 14 knots (26 km/h; 16 mph)
- Complement: 148
- Armament: 4 × single 12 cm (4.7 in) Type 3 guns; 3 × twin 53.3 cm (21.0 in) torpedo tubes; 20 × mines

Service record
- Operations: Second Sino-Japanese War; Pacific War

The Japanese destroyer Sawakaze (澤風, Marsh Wind) was one of 15 Minekaze-class destroyers built for the Imperial Japanese Navy (IJN) during the late 1910s. The ship served as a plane guard and played a minor role in the Second Sino-Japanese War during the 1930s. She spent most of the Pacific War on escort duties in Japanese waters before she became an anti-submarine training ship in 1944. Sawakaze survived the war and was broken up for scrap in 1948.

== Design and description ==
The Minekaze class was designed with higher speed and better seakeeping than the preceding Kawakaze-class destroyers. The ships had an overall length of 102.5 meters (336 ft 3 in) and were 94.5 meters (310 ft 0 in) between perpendiculars. They had a beam of 9.04 meters (29 ft 8 in), and a mean draft of 2.9 meters (9 ft 6 in). The Minekaze-class ships displaced 1,366 metric tons (1,344 long tons) at standard load and 1,676 metric tons (1,650 long tons) at deep load. They were powered by two Parsons geared steam turbines, each driving one propeller shaft, using steam provided by four Kampon water-tube boilers. The turbines were designed to produce 38,500 shaft horsepower (28,700 kW), which would propel the ships at 39 knots (72 km/h; 45 mph). The ships carried 401 metric tons (395 long tons) of fuel oil which gave them a range of 3,600 nautical miles (6,700 km; 4,100 mi) at 14 knots (26 km/h; 16 mph). Their crew consisted of 148 officers and crewmen.

The main armament of the Minekaze-class ships consisted of four 12-centimeter (4.7 in) Type 3 guns in single mounts; one gun forward of the superstructure, one between the two funnels, one aft of the rear funnel, and the last gun atop the aft superstructure. The guns were numbered '1' to '4' from front to rear. The ships carried three above-water twin sets of 53.3-centimeter (21.0 in) torpedo tubes; one mount was in the well deck between the forward superstructure and the forward gun and the other two were between the aft funnel and aft superstructure. They could also carry 20 mines as well as minesweeping gear.

Unlike her sister ships, Sawakaze was modified in 1939 to serve as an aircraft rescue ship. Two years later, all of her torpedo tubes were removed as were all of her guns except No. 1. They were replaced by 10 license-built 25 mm (0.98 in) Type 96 light AA guns, four depth charge throwers, and 36 depth charges. During the summer of 1944, her light AA armament was augmented to between thirteen and twenty 25 mm guns and five 13.2 mm (0.5 in) Type 93 anti-aircraft machineguns. In February 1945, No. 1 gun was moved to No. 4 mount and replaced by an experimental nine-barreled, 15-centimeter (5.9 in) rocket launcher. The ship also received a Type 22 radar. By this time she was only capable of 16 knots (30 km/h; 18 mph).

== Construction and career ==
Sawakaze, built at the Mitsubishi shipyard at Nagasaki, was laid down on 7 January 1918, launched on 7 January 1919 and completed on 6 March 1920. On commissioning, Sawakaze was teamed with sister ships Minekaze, Okikaze, and Yakaze at the Sasebo Naval District to form Destroyer Division 2 under the Second Fleet.

From 1930 to 1932, Destroyer Division 2 was assigned to the 1st Air Fleet as part of the escort of the aircraft carrier Akagi to assist in search and rescue operations for downed aircraft. At the time of the First Shanghai incident of 1932, Destroyer Division 2 was engaged in river patrol duties along the Yangzi River in China. From 1935 to December 1938, Sawakaze was assigned to the Tateyama Naval Air Base as a search and rescue craft, and was scheduled to be retired at the end of 1938; however with the start of the Second Sino-Japanese War, the destroyer was kept on active status, and assigned to the Yokosuka Naval District. The ship remained based at Tateyama until March 1942.

=== Pacific War ===
At the time of the attack on Pearl Harbor on 7 December 1941, Sawakaze was still based at Tateyama. The destroyer was reassigned to Yokosuka from March 1942 and assigned anti-submarine patrols of the entrance of Tokyo Bay for the duration of the war, making only an occasional convoy escort run along the coast of Japan to Muroran, Hokkaidō or Kobe. From December 1944, the ship was taken off of active combat status and assigned as a training ship for the Yokosuka Anti-submarine Warfare School. From May 1945, Sawakaze served as a target vessel for the 1st Tokko Air Corps suicide flights. Sawakaze was at Yokosuka at the time of the surrender of Japan. The destroyer was removed from the Navy List on 15 September 1945, and was subsequently broken up in 1947.
