= Minekaze-class destroyer =

Japanese warship class (1919–1946)

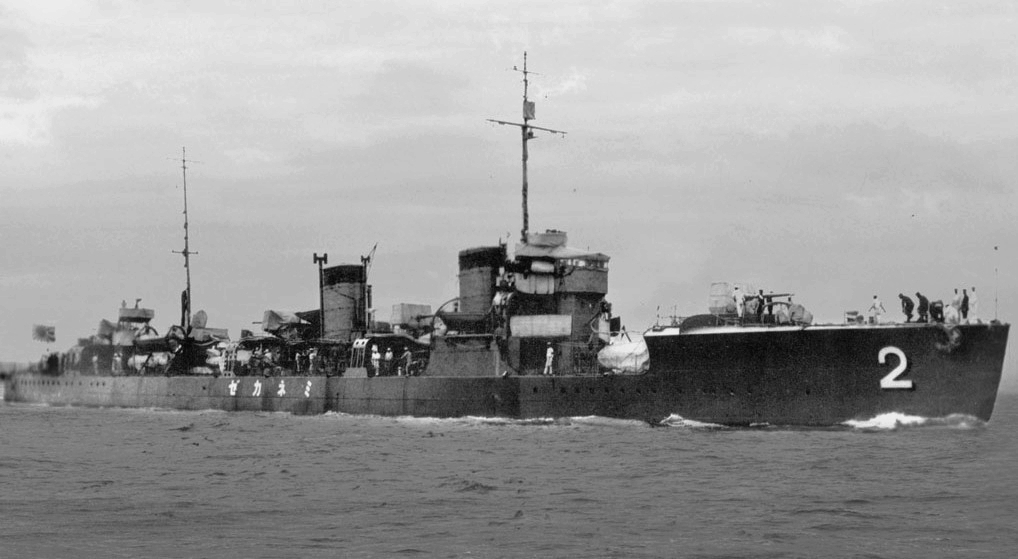
- Minekaze at Yokosuka on 30 August 1932

Class overview
- Name: Minekaze class
- Builders: Maizuru Naval Arsenal (10); Mitsubishi Shipbuilding & Eng. Co.; Nagasaki Shipyard (5)
- Operators: Imperial Japanese Navy; Republic of China Navy
- Preceded by: Momi class
- Succeeded by: Wakatake class
- Subclasses: Nokaze class
- In commission: 1919–1946
- Completed: 15
- Lost: 11
- Retired: 4

General characteristics
- Type: Destroyer
- Displacement: 1,345 long tons (1,367 t) (normal); 1,650 long tons (1,676 t) (full load)
- Length: 97.5 m (319 ft 11 in) (pp); 102.6 m (336 ft 7 in) (o/a)
- Beam: 9 m (29 ft 6 in)
- Draught: 2.9 m (9 ft 6 in)
- Installed power: 4 boilers; 38,500 ihp (28,700 kW)
- Propulsion: 2 shafts; 2 geared steam turbines
- Speed: 39 knots (72 km/h; 45 mph)
- Range: 3,600 nmi (6,700 km; 4,100 mi) at 14 knots (26 km/h; 16 mph)
- Complement: 148
- Armament: 4 × single 120 mm (4.7 in) guns; 2 × 7.7mm machine guns; 3 × twin 533 mm (21 in) torpedo tubes; 20 × mines

The Minekaze class (峯風型駆逐艦, Minekazegata kuchikukan) was a class of fifteen 1st-class destroyers built for the Imperial Japanese Navy. Obsolete by the beginning of the Pacific War, the Minekaze-class ships were then relegated to mostly secondary roles, serving throughout the war as patrol vessels, high speed transports, target control vessels, and as kaiten (suicide torpedo) carriers. Most ultimately were lost to U.S. and British submarines. The basic design of the Minekaze was used for the next three classes of Japanese destroyers, a total of 36 ships.

== Background ==
Construction of the large-sized Minekaze-class destroyers was authorized as part of the Imperial Japanese Navy's 8-4 Fleet Program from fiscal 1917–1920, as an accompaniment to the medium-sized Momi class with which they shared many common design characteristics.

Equipped with powerful engines, these vessels were capable of high speeds and were intended as escorts for the projected Amagi-class battlecruisers, which were ultimately never built.

Two vessels were authorized in fiscal 1917, and an addition five in fiscal 1918. Although none had been completed by the end of World War I, the Imperial Japanese Navy decided to continue the project as many older destroyers were in need of replacement. An additional five vessels were ordered in fiscal 1919, and a final three in fiscal 1920. However, the final three vessels were built to a different design and have a different enough silhouette that they can be regarded as a separate sub-class.

Compared to previous designs, the new destroyers were found to be significantly faster and more powerful than their predecessors, with similar performance to their foreign contemperaries.

== Design ==
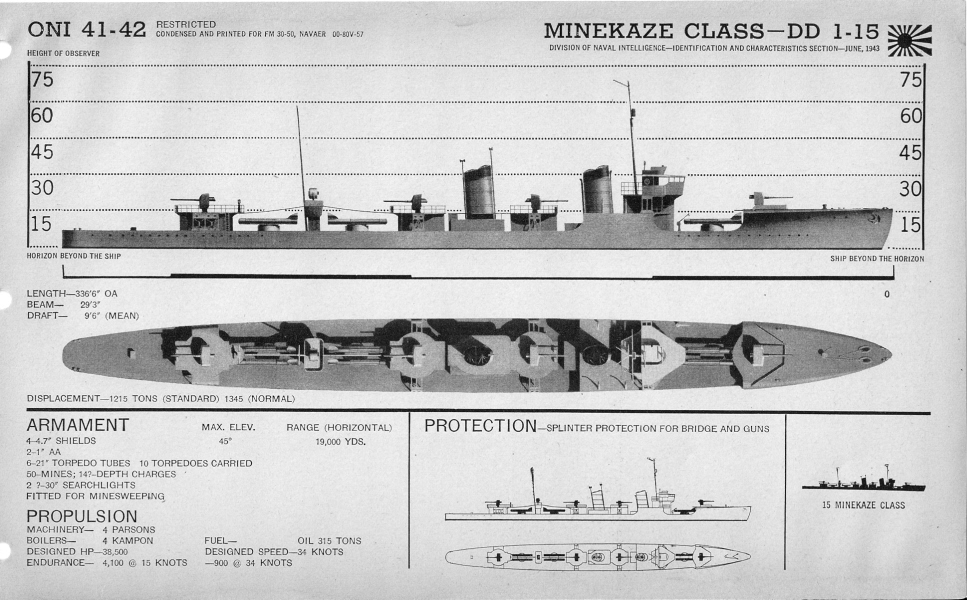
Office of Naval Intelligence recognition drawing of Minekaze class

Coming between the foreign-designed vessels of the earlier part of the century and the innovative Fubuki and Kagerō 'Special Type' destroyers of the 1930s, the Minekaze class was a significant transitional design for the Imperial Japanese Navy, which had carefully studied (but not taken over or given Japanese names to) the five German destroyers received as war reparations after World War I. These five had been the T.181, S.51, S.60, V.80 and V.127, which were all then sold and broken up in Britain or Dordrecht.

Minekaze thus represented a complete break from the previous practice of closely following only British designs and methods. To address the issue of seaworthiness, design requirements called for a larger vessel capable of higher speeds than its predecessors. The Minekaze class incorporated a number of distinctive design innovations including a lengthened forecastle with a break forming a well deck immediately forward of the bridge. This arrangement offered the advantage of protection for the bridge as well as a low, semi protected area for the forward torpedo tubes, albeit at the cost of becoming awash in heavy seas, and was a feature of the German designs. The main battery was mounted as high as possible and all guns were mounted on the centerline of the ship to increase their effectiveness in heavy seas.

The engines were powered by four Kampon boilers running two-shaft geared turbines at 38,500 shp, yielding a rated speed of 39 knots (72 km/h), instead of the direct-drive engines of previous designs. However, as with previous designs, high fuel consumption meant limited range.

=== Armament ===
The Minekaze class had a main battery of four Type 3 120 mm 45 caliber naval guns in single open mounts, exposed to the weather except for a small shield. These were located one forward, one aft, and two amidships. However, the main weaponry for the class were its three twin 21-inch (533 mm) torpedo tubes. One was positioned in the well in front of the bridge and the other two were located abaft the second stack. Two 7.7mm machine guns were also fitted.

By the late 1930s, the Minekaze class were regarded as second-line units, and some were converted for other duties. In 1938, Okikaze was disarmed, but in 1941 with the war fast approaching she remounted her guns. Nadakaze and Shimakaze were redesigned as Patrol Boats 1 and 2 and became destroyer-transports in 1939–1940. In 1941, Sawakaze had her armament removed and was used as an aircraft rescue ship at Tateyama Naval Air Station. The remaining twelve Minekaze ships were modified to be used primarily as convoy escorts, with the removal of the amidship guns and the two aft torpedo mounts. Minesweeping gear on the fantail was replaced by four depth-charge launchers and 36 depth charges. Type 96 25-mm anti-aircraft guns were added in increasing numbers, and eventually totaled between 13 and 20 guns per vessel in a combination of single and twin mounts. These changes increased displacement, which reduced their top speed to 35 knots.

After the start of the Pacific War, Yakaze was removed from active duty in September 1942 and converted to a target ship. In 1945, Namikaze and Shiokaze were modified into Kaiten carriers by the removal of their remaining torpedo tubes and aft gun. Namikaze carried two Kaiten and Shiokaze carried four, which could be launched astern. Both ships also received radar, with Namikaze receiving a Type 22 and Shiokaze receiving a Type 13. Yukaze also received a Type 13.

Sawakaze was also returned to combat status, with a Type 22 radar and an experimental 5.9 inch anti-submarine rocket launcher in place of the forward gun.

=== Nokaze sub-class ===
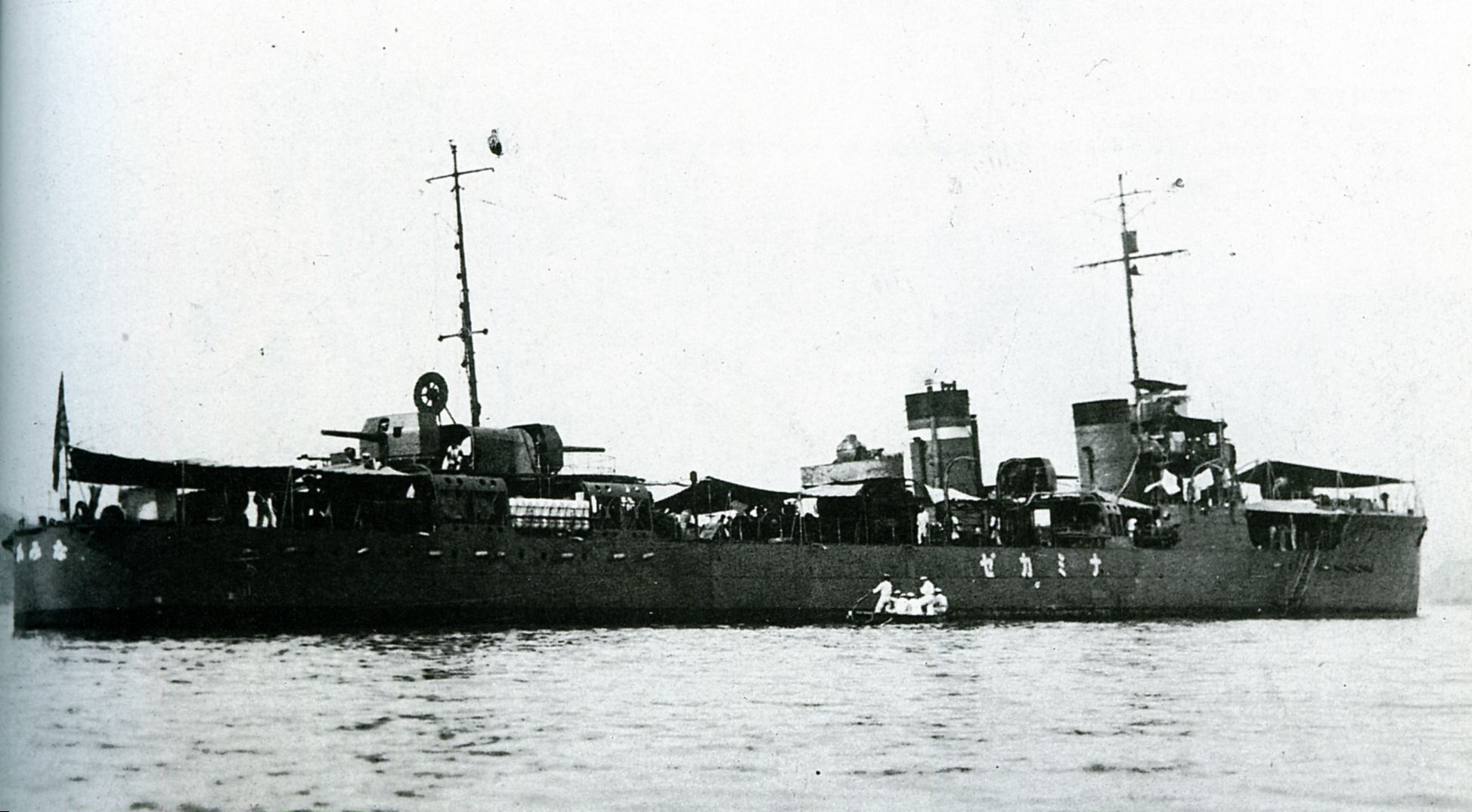
Aft view of Namikaze showing revised weapons layout of the Nokaze sub-class, 1925

The final three vessels in the Minekaze series incorporated a number of improvements gained through operational experience, and form a separate sub-class. The primary difference was in the arrangement of the aft armament. With the Minekaze class, the aft guns were pedestal-mounted along the centerline, with two double torpedo launchers in between. This severely limited the arc of fire of the No. 3 gun. The improved design had a better gunnery fire control system and improved ammunition magazine arrangements. Gun and torpedo positions were changed: the No. 3 gun formerly mounted aft of the second funnel was moved further aft to the "X" position. Torpedo mounts No. 2 and No. 3 were moved closer together and the searchlight platform formerly between them was moved forward to just aft of the second funnel.

== Operational history ==
Commissioned during the 1920s, the Minekaze-class ships were the mainstay of the Imperial Japanese Navy destroyer squadrons throughout the 1930s until gradually replaced by more advanced types.

== List of ships ==
Construction data
Name	Kanji	Builder	Laid down	Launched	Completed	Fate
Minekaze	峯風, 'Mountain wind'	Maizuru Naval Arsenal, Japan	20 Apr 1918	8 Feb 1919	29 May 1920	Torpedoed E of Taiwan 23.12°N 121.30°E, 10 Feb 1944; struck 31 Mar 1944
Sawakaze	澤風, 'Wind from the swamp'	Mitsubishi Shipbuilding & Engineering Co., Nagasaki Shipyard	7 Jan 1918	7 Jan 1919	6 Mar 1920	Retired 15 Sep 1945; scuttled 1948
Okikaze	沖風, 'Offshore wind'	Maizuru Naval Arsenal, Japan	22 Feb 1919	3 Oct 1919	17 Aug 1920	Torpedoed S of Yokosuka 35.02°N 140.12°E, 10 Jan 1943; struck 1 Mar 1943
Shimakaze	島風, 'Wind on the island'	Maizuru Naval Arsenal, Japan	5 Sep 1919	31 Mar 1920	15 Nov 1920	Renamed Patrol Boat PB-1 on 1 Apr 1940; torpedoed WSW of Kavieng 02.51°S 149.43°E, 13 Jan 1943; struck 10 Feb 1943
Nadakaze	灘風, 'Wind on the open sea'	Maizuru Naval Arsenal, Japan	9 Jan 1920	26 Jun 1920	30 Sep 1921	Renamed Patrol Boat PB-2 on 1 Apr 1940; torpedoed Lombok Strait 07.06°S 115.42°E, 25 Jul 1945; struck 30 Sep 1945
Yakaze	矢風, 'Wind of an arrow's flight'	Mitsubishi Shipbuilding & Engineering Co., Nagasaki Shipyard	15 Aug 1918	10 Apr 1920	19 Jul 1920	Torpedo School vessel 20 Jul 1942; lost in explosion 20 Jul 1945; struck 15 Sep 1945
Hakaze	羽風, 'Wind of a bird's flight'	Mitsubishi Shipbuilding & Engineering Co., Nagasaki Shipyard	11 Nov 1918	21 Jun 1920	16 Sep 1920	Torpedoed SW of Kavien 02.47°S 150.38°E, 23 Jan 1943; struck 1 Mar 1943
Shiokaze	汐風, 'Wind springing up at the turn of a tide'	Maizuru Naval Arsenal, Japan	15 May 1920	22 Oct 1920	29 Jul 1921	Retired 5 Oct 1945; scuttled 1948
Akikaze	秋風, 'Autumn wind'	Mitsubishi Shipbuilding & Engineering Co., Nagasaki Shipyard	7 Jun 1920	14 Dec 1920	16 Sep 1921	Torpedoed W of Luzon 16.48°N 117.17°E, 3 Nov 1944; struck 10 Jan 1945
Yūkaze	夕風, 'Evening breeze'	Mitsubishi Shipbuilding & Engineering Co., Nagasaki Shipyard	14 Dec 1920	28 Apr 1921	24 Aug 1921	Retired 5 Oct 1945; prize of war to UK 14 Aug 1947; broken up
Tachikaze	太刀風, 'Wind caused by the stroke of a sword'	Maizuru Naval Arsenal, Japan	18 Aug 1920	31 Mar 1921	5 Dec 1921	Air attack at Truk 07.04°N 151.55°E, 17 Feb 1944; struck 13 Mar 1944
Hokaze	帆風, 'Wind on the sail'	Maizuru Naval Arsenal, Japan	30 Nov 1920	12 Jul 1921	22 Dec 1921	Torpedoed N of Celebes 03.24°N 125.28°E, 6 Jul 1944; struck 10 Oct 1944
Nokaze	野風, 'Wind over the field'	Maizuru Naval Arsenal, Japan	16 Apr 1921	1 Oct 1921	31 Mar 1922	Torpedoed off Cam Ranh Bay 12.48°N 109.38°E 20 Feb 1945; struck 10 Apr 1945
Namikaze	波風, 'Wind on the waves'	Maizuru Naval Arsenal, Japan	7 Nov 1921	24 Jun 1922	11 Nov 1922	Retired 5 Oct 1945; Prize of war to China, 3 Oct 1947; broken up 1960
Numakaze	沼風, 'Wind over the marsh'	Maizuru Naval Arsenal, Japan	10 Aug 1921	22 May 1922	24 Jul 1922	Torpedoed SE of Okinawa 26.29°N 128.26°E, 19 Dec 1943; struck 5 Feb 1944
