= Japanese destroyer Hakaze =

Destroyer of the Imperial Japanese Navy

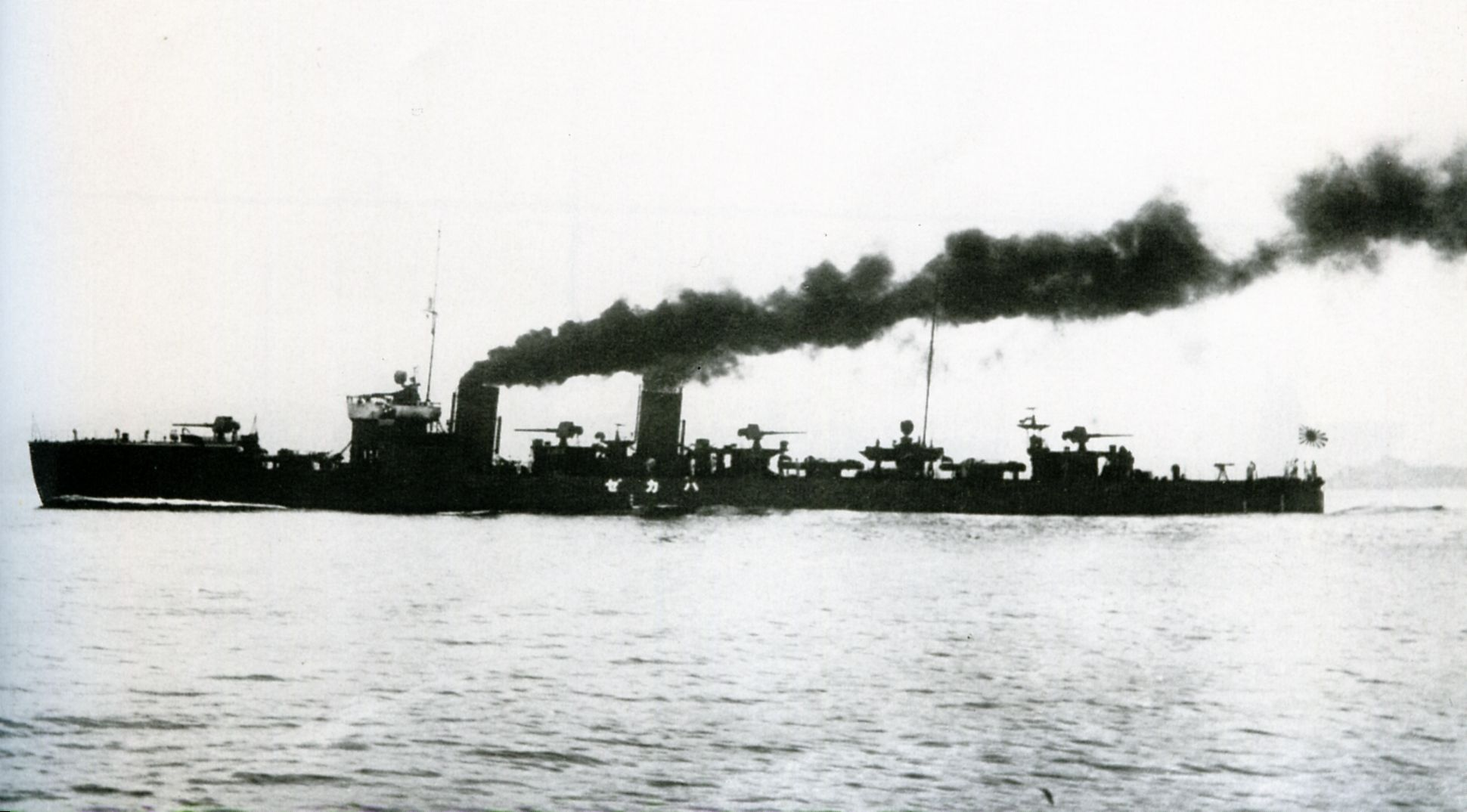
- Hakaze on trials off Nagasaki in fall 1920

History

Empire of Japan
- Name: Hakaze
- Ordered: 1918 fiscal year
- Builder: Mitsubishi, Nagasaki
- Laid down: 11 November 1918
- Launched: 21 June 1920
- Completed: 16 September 1920
- Stricken: 1 March 1943
- Fate: Sunk on 23 January 1943

General characteristics
- Class & type: Minekaze-class destroyer
- Displacement: 1,366 t (1,344 long tons) (normal); 1,676 t (1,650 long tons) (deep load)
- Length: 97.5 m (319 ft 11 in) (pp); 102.5 m (336 ft 3 in) (o/a)
- Beam: 9.04 m (29 ft 8 in)
- Draft: 2.9 m (9 ft 6 in)
- Installed power: 38,500 shp (28,700 kW); 4 × Kampon water-tube boilers
- Propulsion: 2 shafts; 2 × Kampon geared steam turbines
- Speed: 39 knots (72 km/h; 45 mph)
- Range: 3,600 nmi (6,700 km; 4,100 mi) at 14 knots (26 km/h; 16 mph)
- Complement: 148
- Armament: 4 × single 12 cm (4.7 in) Type 3 guns; 3 × twin 53.3 cm (21.0 in) torpedo tubes; 20 × mines

Service record
- Operations: Second Sino-Japanese War; Pacific War

The Japanese destroyer Hakaze (羽風, Winged Wind) was one of 15 Minekaze-class destroyers built for the Imperial Japanese Navy (IJN) in the late 1910s. During the Pacific War, she supported Japanese operations during the Malayan, Dutch East Indies, and Guadalcanal Campaigns. The ship was sunk by an American submarine in early 1943.

== Design and description ==
The Minekaze class was designed with higher speed and better seakeeping than the preceding Kawakaze-class destroyers. The ships had an overall length of 102.5 meters (336 ft 3 in) and were 94.5 meters (310 ft 0 in) between perpendiculars. They had a beam of 9.04 meters (29 ft 8 in), and a mean draft of 2.9 meters (9 ft 6 in). The Minekaze-class ships displaced 1,366 metric tons (1,344 long tons) at standard load and 1,676 metric tons (1,650 long tons) at deep load. They were powered by two Parsons geared steam turbines, each driving one propeller shaft, using steam provided by four Kampon water-tube boilers. The turbines were designed to produce 38,500 shaft horsepower (28,700 kW), which would propel the ships at 39 knots (72 km/h; 45 mph). The ships carried 401 metric tons (395 long tons) of fuel oil which gave them a range of 3,600 nautical miles (6,700 km; 4,100 mi) at 14 knots (26 km/h; 16 mph). Their crew consisted of 148 officers and crewmen.

The main armament of the Minekaze-class ships consisted of four 12-centimeter (4.7 in) Type 3 guns in single mounts; one gun forward of the superstructure, one between the two funnels, one aft of the rear funnel, and the last gun atop the aft superstructure. The guns were numbered '1' to '4' from front to rear. The ships carried three above-water twin sets of 53.3-centimeter (21.0 in) torpedo tubes; one mount was in the well deck between the forward superstructure and the forward gun and the other two were between the aft funnel and aft superstructure. They could also carry 20 mines as well as minesweeping gear.

In 1937–38, Hakaze was one of the ships that had her hull strengthened, funnel caps added and her fuel capacity reduced to 300 metric tons (295 long tons). Early in the war, Nos. 2 and 3 guns and both sets of aft torpedo tubes were removed in exchange for four depth charge throwers, 36 depth charges, and 10 license-built 25 mm (0.98 in) Type 96 light AA guns. These changes reduced their speed to 35 knots (65 km/h; 40 mph).

== Construction and career ==
Hakaze, built at the Mitsubishi shipyard in Nagasaki was laid down on 11 November 1918, launched on 21 June 1920 and completed on 16 September 1920. From 1937 to 1938, Hakaze was assigned to patrols of the northern and central China coastlines in support of Japanese combat operations in the Second Sino-Japanese War.

=== Pacific War ===
At the start of the Pacific War on 7 December 1941, Hakaze was assigned to Destroyer Division 34 under the command of the IJN 11th Air Fleet, and was based at Cape St. Jacques south of Saigon in French Indochina supporting the 22nd Air Flotilla. The destroyer's primary mission in the early stages of the Pacific War was to transport materials to Miri and Kuching in Sarawak and to Kota Bharu in Malaya for the construction of forward air bases.

In February 1942, after providing support for Operation L (the invasion of Palembang on Sumatra in the Netherlands East Indies), Hakaze was based out of Bangka, from which she made anti-submarine patrols. She was transferred to Bangkok in March, and Singapore in April. In May, Hakaze was based at Rabaul in the Solomon Islands, from which the destroyer supported the attempted Operation Mo (the invasion of Port Moresby). After returning to Maizuru briefly for repairs at the end of May, Hakaze escorted a convoy to Saipan, and from Saipan to Hahajima in the Ogasawara Islands and back. In August, she escorted a convoy from Saipan to Rabaul and began patrols from that base through October. In October, she escorted several convoys in preparation of the Guadalcanal offensive. In November, after being used as a "Tokyo Express" high-speed transport to convey troops from Buin to Munda, she made an additional four transport runs in the same month.

From the end of November through 20 January 1943, Hakaze was assigned to patrol/escort duties in the Shortlands–Buka–Rabaul–Kavieng sector. While escorting the seaplane tender Akitsushima, she attacked the submarine USS Guardfish but was in turn torpedoed and sunk on 23 January 1943 approximately 15 miles (24 km) south of Kavieng, New Ireland at position 02°47′S 150°38′E. On 1 March 1943, Hakaze was stricken from the Navy List.
