= Maizuru Naval Arsenal =

Shipyard owned and operated by the Imperial Japanese Navy

Coordinates: 35.480815°N 135.374341°E

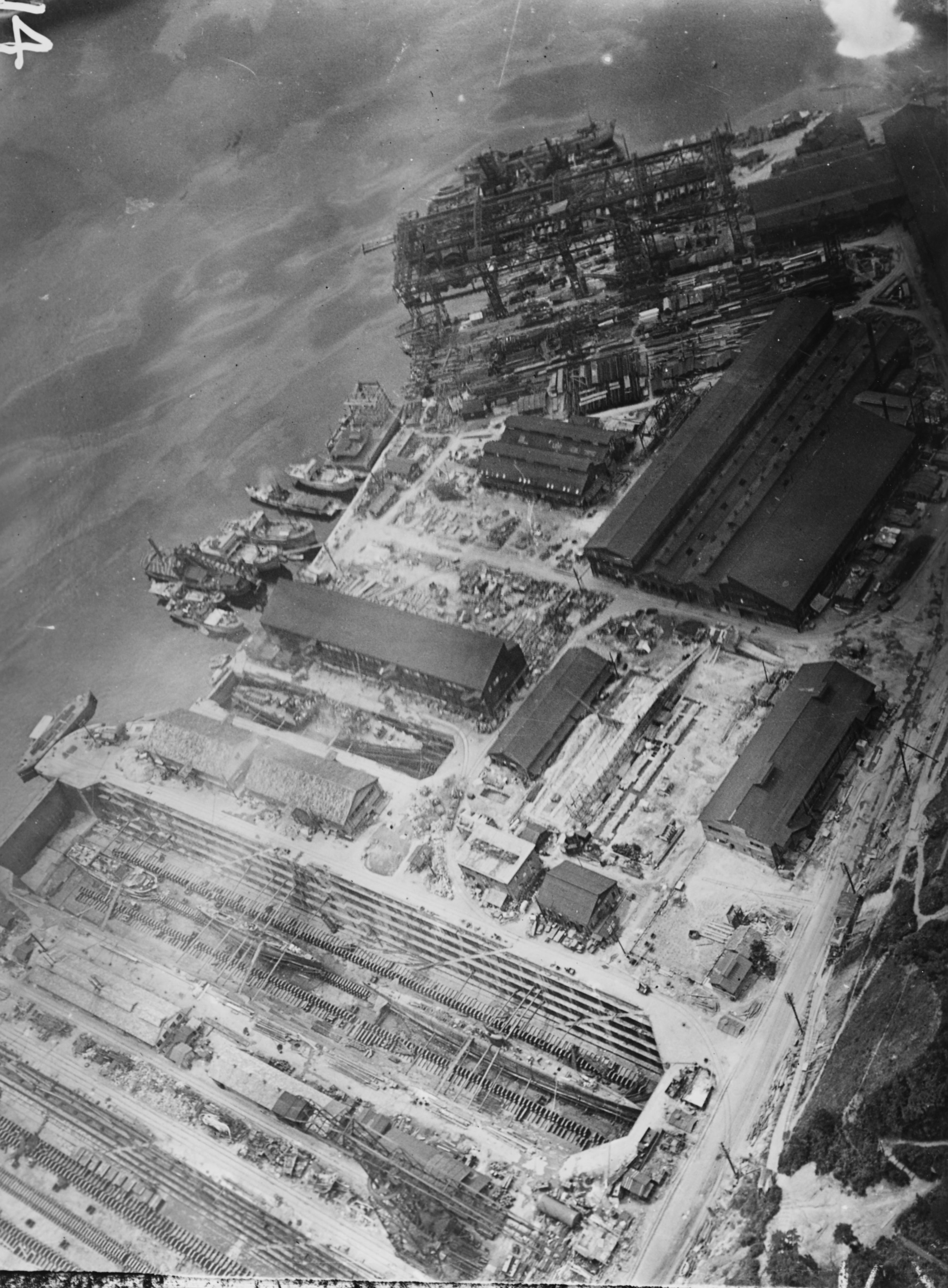
Maizuru Naval Arsenal, 1945

Maizuru Naval Arsenal (舞鶴海軍工廠, Maizuru Kaigun Kosho) was one of four principal naval shipyards owned and operated by the Imperial Japanese Navy, located in Maizuru, Kyoto Prefecture.

== History ==
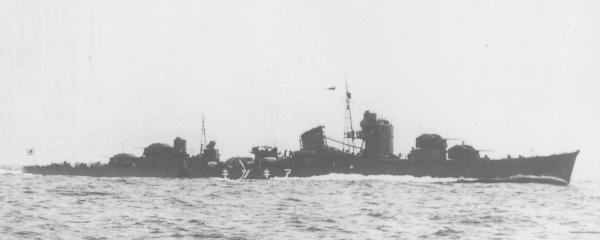
Destroyer Akizuki, one of various destroyers produced at Maizuru Naval Arsenal

The Maizuru Naval District was established at Maizuru, Kyoto Prefecture in 1889, as the fourth of the naval districts responsible for the defense of the Japanese home islands. After the establishment of the navy base, a ship repair facility was established in 1901 with a dry dock. With the addition of equipment and facilities for ship production by 1903, the Maizuru Naval Arsenal was officially established.

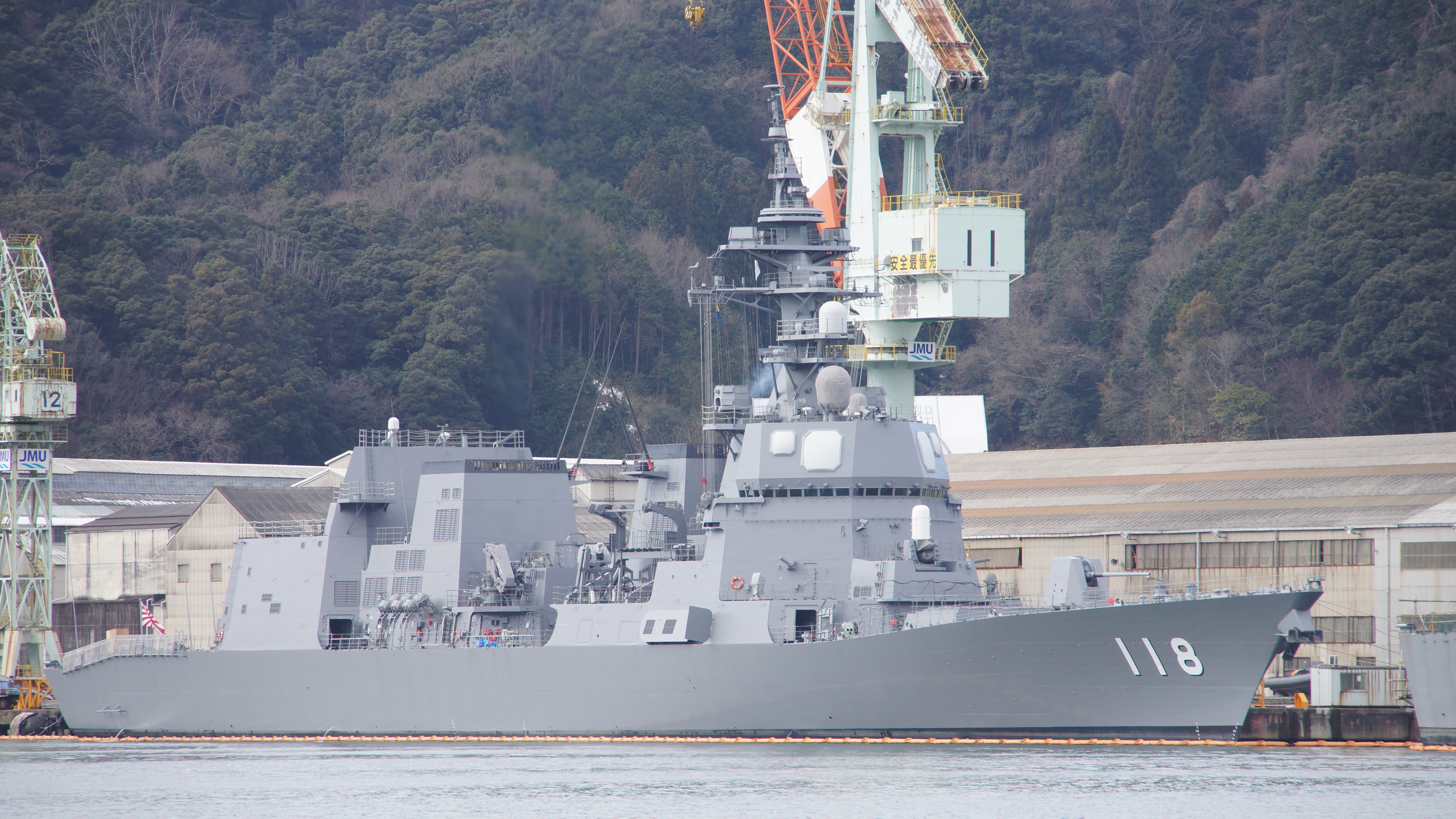
The modern shipyard at Maizuru owned by Japan Marine United. Pictured: JS Fuyuzuki DD-118

Additional dry docks were completed in 1904 and 1914. When the No. 3 dry dock was completed in 1914, it was the largest in Japan at the time. In 1923, after the Washington Naval Treaty, there were discussions within the Navy Ministry about closing the facility, and it was largely mothballed until 1936. Afterwards, it reopened and expanded, building ships, aircraft and weapons for the military. It specialized mostly in destroyer-size and smaller vessels.

=== Post WW II ===
In the post-World War II period, a private company, Iino Industries Co. Ltd., took over and formed the Maizuru Shipyards.

In 1963, the name was changed to Maizuru Heavy Industries. In 1971, it was merged with Hitachi Zosen Corporation. In 2002, Hitachi Zosen spun off the shipbuilder into a joint venture with JFE Engineering called Universal Shipbuilding Corporation. Universal Shipbuilding Corporation and IHI Marine United Inc. united and became Japan Marine United in 2013.

The former head office and some warehouses associated with the shipyards are preserved as commemorative museums by the Maizuru city government. The pre-war dry docks and one of the large cranes are still in use today.

== Ships built at Maizuru Naval Arsenal ==
=== Russo-Japanese War ===
- Kamikaze-class (1905): Oite, Yūnagi, Uranami, Isonami, Ayanami

=== World War I ===
- Umikaze-class: Umikaze
- Sakura-class: Sakura, Tachibana
- Kaba-class: Kaede
- Minekaze-class: Minekaze, Okikaze, Shimakaze, Nadakaze, Shiokaze, Tachikaze, Hokaze, Nokaze, Namikaze, Numakaze
- Wakatake-class: Kuretake
- Enoki-class: Enoki
- Momo-class: Kashi, Hinoki

=== World War II ===
- Kamikaze-class (3 of 9): Harukaze, Matsukaze, Hatakaze
- Mutsuki-class (2 of 12): Kisaragi, Kikuzuki
- Fubuki-class (6 of 24): Fubuki, Hatsuyuki, Shikinami, Yūgiri, Sazanami, Hibiki
- Hatsuharu-class (1 of 6): Yugure
- Shiratsuyu-class (2 of 10): Harusame, Umikaze
- Asashio-class (2 of 10): Ōshio, Arare
- Kagerō-class (5 of 19): Kagerō, Oyashio, Amatsukaze, Nowaki, Arashi
- Yūgumo-class (6 of 19): Yūgumo, Makinami, Hayanami, Hamanami, Okinami, Hayashimo
- Shimakaze-class (1 of 1): Shimakaze
- Akizuki-class (4 of 12): Akizuki, Hatsuzuki, Fuyutsuki, Hanazuki
- Matsu/Tachibana-class (10 of 32): Matsu, Momo, Maki, Kaya, Tsubaki, Nire, Shii, Enoki, Odake, Hatsuume

Total: 41 of 153 (27%) of Japanese destroyers that were relevant during World War II.

== See also ==
- JDS Kashima (TV-3508)
