= Third Fleet (Imperial Japanese Navy) =

Fleet of the Imperial Japanese Navy (1903–1944)

The 3rd Fleet (第三艦隊, Dai-san Kantai) was a fleet of the Imperial Japanese Navy (IJN), which was created in 1903, and disbanded on six occasions and revived on five occasions. It was first created during the Russo-Japanese War, was revived for the 1911 Xinhai Revolution, World War I, the Second Sino-Japanese War, and World War II, and finally disbanded in 1944.

== History ==
=== Russo-Japanese War ===
First established on 28 December 1903, the 3rd Fleet was created by the Imperial General Headquarters as an administrative unit to manage vessels considered obsolete for front-line combat service. These vessels were used primarily for training and for coastal patrol duties. The 3rd Fleet came under the aegis of the Combined Fleet for the duration of the Russo-Japanese War from March 1904. Although initially derided as a "dinosaur fleet", the 3rd fleet proved invaluable at the Battle of Tsushima and the Invasion of Sakhalin. It was disbanded on 20 December 1905.

=== South China Fleet ===
The 3rd Fleet was revived on 24 December 1908 as an expeditionary force during the Chinese Republican Revolution, to safeguard Japanese interests (civilians and property) on the Chinese mainland and (if necessary) to conduct emergency evacuation. It was nicknamed the "South China Fleet" after its chief area of envisioned activity was the South China Sea. Its cruisers patrolled the Yangtze River and other large rivers in China, and its headquarters was in the Japanese concession in Shanghai. It was disbanded on 25 December 1915.

=== World War I ===
The 3rd Fleet was reconstituted on the same day as the dissolution of the "South China Fleet", initially to act as a training force to supplement Japan's contribution to the World War I under the terms of the Anglo-Japanese Alliance. When the Russian Revolution was proclaimed by the communist forces in Russia, the mission of the 3rd Fleet was changed to that of patrols of the Russian sea coast for the Siberian Intervention by Japanese ground forces in support of anti-Bolshevik forces. The 3rd Fleet was disbanded on 1 December 1922, and many of its vessels were scrapped almost immediately under the terms of the Washington Naval Treaty.

=== First China Expeditionary Fleet ===
The 3rd Fleet was again raised on 2 February 1938 as part of Japan's emergency buildup of forces after the Shanghai Incident. The buildup took the form of three separate expeditionary fleets, consisting primarily of cruisers and gunboats to patrol the Chinese coast and major riverways and to support the landings of Japanese ground forces. With the outbreak of the Second Sino-Japanese War in 1937, the 3rd Fleet came under the aegis of the China Area Fleet. It was disbanded on 15 November 1939; however, some of the organizational and command structures for ground forces under the First China Expeditionary Fleet remained in place until August 1943.

=== Southern Expeditionary Fleet ===
The 3rd Fleet was recreated once again on 10 April 1941 with the additional designation "Southern Expeditionary Fleet" for the specific task of invading the Philippines. At the time of the attack on Pearl Harbor, its headquarters was in Palau and its mission expanded to include the invasions of Java, Borneo and other islands of the Netherlands East Indies. It was superseded by the 2nd Southern Expeditionary Fleet under the aegis of the Southwest Area Fleet on 10 March 1942.

==== Order of Battle at time of Pearl Harbor ====
Based at Takao, Formosa

12th Carrier Division

AV Kamikawa Maru (flagship)
AV Sanuki Maru
AV Sanyo Maru

16th Division

CL Nagara (fleet flagship)
CL Kuma
CA Ashigara

17th Division

AN/CM Itsukushima (flagship)
AN/CM Yaeyama
CM Tatsumiya Maru
CM Tatsuharu Maru

Supply Group

AR Yamabiko Maru
AP Senko Maru
AW Koan Maru
AW Asayama Maru (aka Chozan Maru or Chosan Maru)
AW Goryu Maru
AO Hayatomo Maru
AO Genyo Maru
AP Kosei Maru
AGS Kyodo Maru No. 36

5th Destroyer Squadron

CL Natori (flagship)
5th Destroyer Division

DD Asakaze
DD Harukaze
DD Hatakaze
DD Matsukaze

22nd Destroyer Division

DD Fumizuki
DD Minazuki
DD Nagatsuki
DD Satsuki

6th Submarine Squadron

AS Chōgei (flagship)
9th Submarine Division

I-123
I-124

9th Submarine Division

I-121
I-122

1st Base Force

21 Minesweeper Division

AM W-7
AM W-8
AM W-9
AM W-10
AM W-11
AM W-12

1st Gunboat Division

PG Busho Maru
PG Keiko Maru
PG Kanko Maru
PG Myoken Maru

1st Subchaser Division

PC Ch-1
PC Ch-2
PC Ch-3

2nd Subchaser Division

PC Ch-13
PC Ch-14
PC Ch-15

51st Subchaser Division

PC Kyo Maru No. 12
PC Kyo Maru No. 13
AN Tōkō Maru No. 1 Go

52nd Subchaser Division

PC Shonan Maru No. 17
PC Takunan Maru No. 5
AN Fukuei Maru No. 15

Other

AN/CM Shirataka
AN/CM Aotaka
AGM Ikushima Maru
AGM Kimishima Maru
AP Myoku Maru
AG Hakusan Maru

2nd Base Force

21st Torpedo Boat Division

PT Chidori
PT Hatsukari
PT Manazuru
PT Tomozuru

11th Minesweeper Division

AM W-13
AM W-14
AM W-15
AM W-16

30th Minesweeper Division

AM W-17
AM W-18
AM W-19
AM W-20

2nd Gunboat Division

PG Kamitsu Maru
PG Tokuyo Maru
PG Taiko Maru
PM Banyo Maru

3rd Gunboat Division

PG Aso Maru
PG Kiso Maru
PG Nampo Maru

53rd Subchaser Division

PC Kyo Maru No. 2
PC Kyo Maru No. 11
AN Korei Maru

54th Subchaser Division

PC Shonan Maru No. 1
PC Shonan Maru No. 2
AN Nagara Maru

21st Subchaser Division

PC Ch-4
PC Ch-5
PC Ch-6
PC Ch-16
PC Ch-17
PC Ch-18

31st Subchaser Division

PC Ch-10
PC Ch-11
PC Ch-12

Other

CMN Wakataka
ACM Nichiyu Maru
PG/CM Imizu Maru
PG/CM Seian Maru
PG/CM Shinko Maru
AP Sumanoura Maru
AP Kumagawa Maru
AP Kenryu Maru
AG Hakozaki Maru

32nd Special Base Force

1st Patrol Boat Division

PB Patrol Boat No. 1
PB Patrol Boat No. 2
PB Patrol Boat No. 32
PB Patrol Boat No. 33
PB Patrol Boat No. 34
PB Patrol Boat No. 35
PB Patrol Boat No. 36
PB Patrol Boat No. 37
PB Patrol Boat No. 38
PB Patrol Boat No. 39

Other

CMc Kamome
CMc Tsubame
PG/CM Imizu Maru
AMc Nichiyu Maru

=== World War II (post-July 1942) ===
The sixth (and final) incarnation of the 3rd Fleet was formed on 14 July 1942 immediately after the disastrous Battle of Midway as an aircraft carrier task force modeled after similar units in the United States Navy. It was centered on the new aircraft carriers Shōkaku and Zuikaku. It played an important role during the Pyrrhic victory at the Battle of Santa Cruz, in which the American aircraft carrier Hornet was sunk, but at the cost of many of the best air crews in the Japanese Navy.

After March 1944, the 3rd Fleet was basically merged with the 2nd Fleet, and suffered through the disastrous Battle of the Philippine Sea, losing 3 of its aircraft carriers, including the newly commissioned Taihō and over 350 carrier planes.

In October 1944, the 3rd Fleet was designated the "Northern Force" in a three-force plan to defeat the Allied invasion of the Japanese-held Philippines. The 3rd Fleet carriers were divested of all but 108 aircraft and sent to lure the American-led fleet away from protecting the troop landing ships. On 25–26 October, facing a large force that included ten USN carriers, with 600–1,000 aircraft, 3rd Fleet lost 4 aircraft carriers, one light cruiser and one destroyer at the Battle off Cape Engaño. The 3rd Fleet effectively ceased to exist, and was officially disbanded on 15 December 1944.

== Commanders of the 3rd Fleet ==
=== 1st Creation (Russo-Japanese War) ===
	Commander-in-Chief	Dates		Previous Post	Next Post	Notes
1	Vice-Admiral; Kataoka Shichirō 片岡七郎	28 December 1903	20 December 1905	Commander; Takeshiki Naval Base	Commander-in-chief; 1st Fleet	

=== 2nd Creation (World War I) ===
	Rank	Name	Dates	
1	Admiral	Kakuichi Murakami	13 December 1915	6 April 1917
2	Admiral	Ryokitsu Arima	6 April 1917	1 December 1918
3	Admiral	Teijiro Kuroi	1 December 1918	1 December 1919
4	Admiral	Kaneo Nomaguchi	1 December 1919	1 December 1920
5	Admiral	Kozaburo Oguri	1 December 1920	1 December 1921
6	Admiral	Baron Kantarō Suzuki	1 December 1921	27 July 1922
7	Vice-Admiral	Naoe Nakano	27 July 1922	1 December 1922

=== 3rd Creation (2nd Sino-Japanese War) ===
	Commander-in-Chief	Dates		Previous Post	Next Post	Notes
1	Vice-Admiral; Nomura Kichisaburō 野村吉三郎	2 February 1932	28 June 1932	Commander-in-chief; Yokosuka Naval District	Commander-in-chief; Yokosuka Naval District	Relieved after being blinded in eye during the Hongkou Park bombing 29 April 1932.
2	Vice-Admiral; Sakonji Seizō 左近司政三	28 June 1932	1 December 1932		Commander-in-chief; Sasebo Naval District	
3	Vice-Admiral; Mitsumasa Yonai 米内光政	1 December 1932	15 September 1933	Commander; Chinkai Guard District	Attendant; Navy General Staff	
4	Vice-Admiral; Imamura Nobujirō	15 September 1933	15 November 1934		Commander-in-chief; Sasebo Naval District	
5	Vice-Admiral; Hyakutake Gengo 百武源吾	15 November 1934	1 December 1935	Commander-in-chief; Maizuru Guard District	Commander-in-chief; Sasebo Naval District	
6	Vice-Admiral; Oikawa Koshirō 及川古志郎	1 December 1935	1 December 1936		Director; Naval Aviation Bureau	
7	Admiral; Hasegawa Kiyoshi 長谷川清	1 December 1936	25 April 1938	Vice-Minister of the Navy	Commander-in-chief; Yokosuka Naval District	Also Commander-in-chief China Area Fleet after 20 October 1937
8	Vice-Admiral; Oikawa Koshirō 及川古志郎	25 April 1938	15 November 1939	Chief; Naval Aviation Bureau	Commander-in-chief; China Area Fleet	Also Commander-in-chief China Area Fleet

On 15 November 1939 the 3rd Fleet was reorganized into the 1st China Expeditionary Fleet.
Admiral Oikawa retained command of the China Area Fleet but command of the former 3rd Fleet passed to Tanimoto Umatarō. Command History continues there.

=== 4th Creation (Pacific War) ===
	Rank	Name	Dates	
1	Admiral	Ibō Takahashi	10 April 1941	10 March 1942
X		Disbanded	10 March 1942	14 July 1942
1	Admiral	Chuichi Nagumo	14 July 1942	11 November 1942
2	Vice-Admiral	Jisaburō Ozawa	11 November 1942	15 November 1944

Chief of Staff

	Rank	Name	Dates	
1	Rear-Admiral	Shizuka Nakamura	28 December 1903	12 January 1905
2	Vice-Admiral	Koshi Saito	12 January 1905	2 November 1905
X		Disbanded	20 December 1905	13 December 1915
1	Rear-Admiral	Shichitaro Takagi	13 December 1915	1 April 1916
2	Rear-Admiral	Tokutaro Hiraga	1 April 1916	19 March 1917
3	Vice-Admiral	Hisatsune Iida	19 March 1917	1 December 1917
4	Vice-Admiral	Shichigoro Saito	1 December 1917	1 December 1918
5	Vice-Admiral	Shinzaburo Furukawa	1 December 1918	10 June 1919
6	Vice-Admiral	Kosaburo Uchida	10 June 1919	20 November 1920
7	Rear-Admiral	Hisamori Taguchi	20 November 1920	1 December 1921
8	Vice-Admiral	Naomoto Komatsu	1 December 1921	1 December 1922
X		Disbanded	1 December 1922	2 February 1932
1	Admiral	Shigetarō Shimada	2 February 1932	28 June 1932
2	Vice-Admiral	Shigeru Kikuno	28 June 1932	1 April 1933
3	Rear-Admiral	Seizaburo Mitsui	1 April 1933	15 November 1933
4	Admiral	Shirō Takasu	15 November 1933	15 November 1934
5	Vice-Admiral	Eijiro Kondo	15 November 1934	2 December 1935
6	Vice-Admiral	Seiichi Iwamura	2 December 1935	16 November 1936
7	Vice-Admiral	Rokuzo Sugiyama	16 November 1936	25 April 1938
8	Vice-Admiral	Jinichi Kusaka	25 April 1938	23 October 1939
9	Admiral	Shigeyoshi Inoue	23 October 1939	15 November 1939
X		Disbanded	15 November 1939	10 April 1941
1	Vice-Admiral	Toshihisa Nakamura	10 April 1941	10 March 1942
2	Vice-Admiral	Ryunosuke Kusaka	14 July 1942	23 November 1942
3	Vice-Admiral	Sadayoshi Yamada	23 November 1942	6 December 1943
4	Rear-Admiral	Keizo Komura	6 December 1943	1 October 1944
5	Rear-Admiral	Sueo Obayashi	1 October 1944	15 November 1944
