= Japanese destroyer Ashi =

Destroyer in the Imperial Japanese Navy

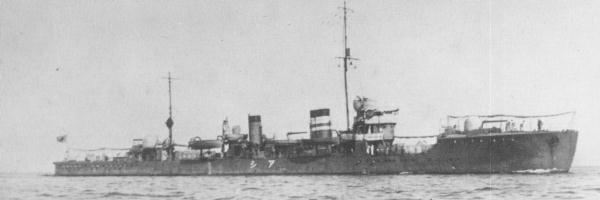
- Ashi

History

Empire of Japan
- Name: Ashi
- Builder: Kawasaki Heavy Industries, Kobe
- Laid down: 15 November 1920
- Launched: 3 September 1921
- Completed: 29 October 1921
- Fate: Decommissioned 1 February 1940; converted to training ship, re-converted to auxiliary ship No.2 Tomariura (第二泊浦, Dai-2 Tomariura) 15 December 1944; modified to Shin'yō suicide motorboat mothership in 1945, scrapped 1947.

General characteristics (as built)
- Type: Momi-class destroyer
- Displacement: 850 long tons (864 t) (normal); 1,020 long tons (1,036 t) (deep load)
- Length: 275 ft (83.8 m) (pp); 280 ft (85.3 m) (o/a)
- Beam: 26 ft (7.9 m)
- Draft: 8 ft (2.4 m)
- Installed power: 3 × Kampon water-tube boilers; 21,500 shp (16,000 kW)
- Propulsion: 2 shafts; 2 × geared steam turbines
- Speed: 36 knots (67 km/h; 41 mph)
- Range: 3,000 nmi (5,600 km; 3,500 mi) at 15 knots (28 km/h; 17 mph)
- Complement: 110
- Armament: 3 × single 12 cm (4.7 in) guns; 2 × twin 533 mm (21 in) torpedo tubes

The Japanese destroyer Ashi (葦) was one of 21 Momi-class destroyers built for the Imperial Japanese Navy (IJN) in the late 1910s. It was decommissioned on February 1, 1940, and converted to a training ship. It was later re-converted to auxiliary ship No.2 Tomariura (第二泊浦, Dai-2 Tomariura) on December 15, 1944, and was later modified into a Shin'yō suicide motorboat mothership in 1945. It was surrendered at the end of World War II and was finally scrapped in 1947.

== Design and description ==
The Momi class was designed with higher speed and better seakeeping than the preceding Enoki-class second-class destroyers. The ships had an overall length of 280 feet (85.3 m) and were 275 feet (83.8 m) between perpendiculars. They had a beam of 26 feet (7.9 m), and a mean draft of 8 feet (2.4 m). The Momi-class ships displaced 850 long tons (864 t) at standard load and 1,020 long tons (1,036 t) at deep load. Ashi was powered by two Brown-Curtis geared steam turbines, each driving one propeller shaft using steam provided by three Kampon water-tube boilers. The turbines were designed to produce 21,500 shaft horsepower (16,000 kW) to give the ships a speed of 36 knots (67 km/h; 41 mph). The ships carried a maximum of 275 long tons (279 t) of fuel oil which gave them a range of 3,000 nautical miles (5,600 km; 3,500 mi) at 15 knots (28 km/h; 17 mph). Their crew consisted of 110 officers and crewmen.

The main armament of the Momi-class ships consisted of three 12-centimeter (4.7 in) Type 3 guns in single mounts; one gun forward of the well deck, one between the two funnels, and the last gun atop the aft superstructure. The guns were numbered '1' to '3' from front to rear. The ships carried two above-water twin sets of 533-millimeter (21 in) torpedo tubes; one mount was in the well deck between the forward superstructure and the bow gun and the other between the aft funnel and aft superstructure.

== Construction and career ==
Ashi was laid down on November 15, 1920, at the Kawasaki Heavy Industries shipyard at Kobe. She was launched on September 3, 1921, and completed on October 29, 1921. It was decommissioned on February 1, 1940, and converted to a training ship. It was later re-converted to auxiliary ship No.2 Tomariura (第二泊浦, Dai-2 Tomariura) on December 15, 1944, and was later modified into a Shin'yō suicide motorboat mothership in 1945. It was surrendered at the end of World War II and was finally scrapped in 1947.
