= Japanese destroyer Tsuta =

Two ships of the Japanese Navy have been named Tsuta:

- Japanese destroyer Tsuta (1921), a Momi-class destroyer launched in 1921 she was renamed Patrol Boat No.35 in 1940 and lost in 1942.
- Japanese destroyer Tsuta (1944), a Tachibana-class destroyer launched in 1944 and ceded to China as ROCN Hua Yang in 1947. She was struck in 1954.
