= Japanese destroyer Tade =

Destroyer in the Imperial Japanese Navy

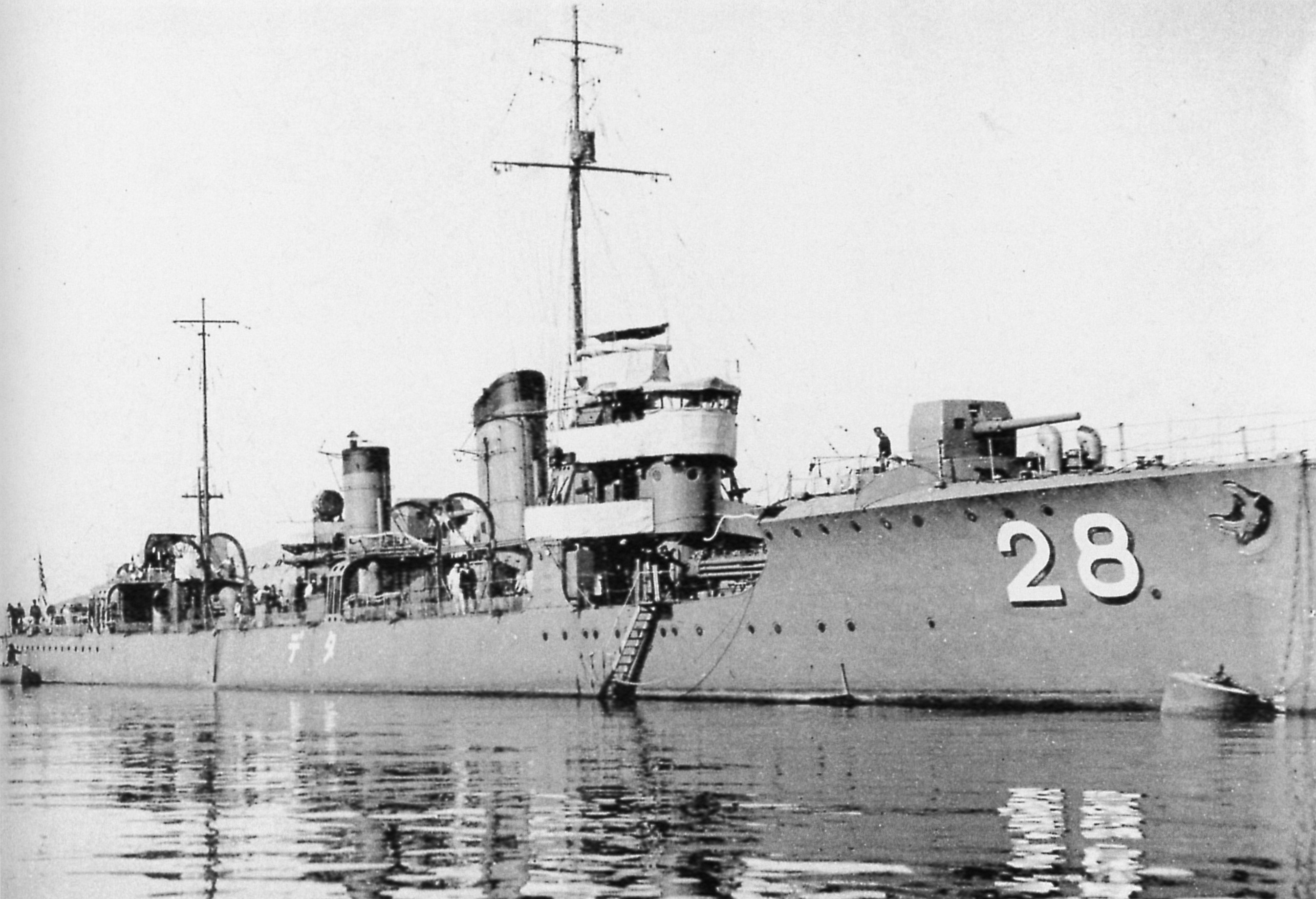
- Tade, 1933

History

Empire of Japan
- Name: Tade
- Builder: Fujinagata Shipyards, Osaka, Japan
- Laid down: 20 December 1920
- Launched: 15 March 1922
- Completed: 31 July 1922
- Renamed: As Patrol Boat No. 39, 1 April 1940
- Reclassified: As patrol boat, 1 April 1940
- Stricken: 1 July 1943
- Fate: Torpedoed and sunk, 23 April 1943

General characteristics as built
- Type: Momi-class destroyer
- Displacement: 864 t (850 long tons) (normal); 1,036 t (1,020 long tons) (deep load)
- Length: 83.8 m (275 ft) (pp); 85.3 m (280 ft) (o/a)
- Beam: 7.9 m (26 ft)
- Draft: 2.4 m (8 ft)
- Installed power: 21,500 shp (16,000 kW); 3 × Kampon water-tube boilers
- Propulsion: 2 shafts; 2 × Brown-Curtis steam turbines
- Speed: 36 knots (67 km/h; 41 mph)
- Range: 3,000 nmi (5,600 km; 3,500 mi) at 15 knots (28 km/h; 17 mph)
- Complement: 110
- Armament: 3 × single 12 cm (4.7 in) Type 3 guns; 2 × twin 53.3 cm (21.0 in) torpedo tubes

The Japanese destroyer Tade (蓼) was one of 21 Momi-class destroyers built for the Imperial Japanese Navy (IJN) in the late 1910s. She was converted into a patrol boat in 1940 and was sunk south of Yonaguni at 23.45°N 122.45°E by the United States Navy submarine USS Seawolf on 23 April 1943.

== Design and description ==
The Momi class was designed with higher speed and better seakeeping than the preceding Enoki-class second-class destroyers. The ships had an overall length of 280 feet (85.3 m) and were 275 feet (83.8 m) between perpendiculars. They had a beam of 26 feet (7.9 m), and a mean draft of 8 feet (2.4 m). The Momi-class ships displaced 850 long tons (864 t) at standard load and 1,020 long tons (1,036 t) at deep load. Tade was powered by two Parsons geared steam turbines, each driving one propeller shaft using steam provided by three Kampon water-tube boilers. The turbines were designed to produce 21,500 shaft horsepower (16,000 kW) to give the ships a speed of 36 knots (67 km/h; 41 mph). The ships carried a maximum of 275 long tons (279 t) of fuel oil which gave them a range of 3,000 nautical miles (5,600 km; 3,500 mi) at 15 knots (28 km/h; 17 mph). Their crew consisted of 110 officers and crewmen.

The main armament of the Momi-class ships consisted of three 12-centimeter (4.7 in) Type 3 guns in single mounts; one gun forward of the well deck, one between the two funnels, and the last gun atop the aft superstructure. The guns were numbered '1' to '3' from front to rear. The ships carried two above-water twin sets of 533-millimeter (21 in) torpedo tubes; one mount was in the well deck between the forward superstructure and the bow gun and the other between the aft funnel and aft superstructure.

In 1940, Tade was converted into a patrol boat. Her torpedo tubes, minesweeping gear, and aft 12 cm gun were removed in exchange for two triple mounts for license-built 25 mm (1 in) Type 96 light AA guns and 60 depth charges. In addition one boiler was removed, which reduced her speed to 18 knots (33 km/h; 21 mph) from 12,000 shp (8,900 kW). These changes made her top heavy and ballast had to be added which increased her displacement to 950 metric tons (935 long tons).

== Construction and career ==
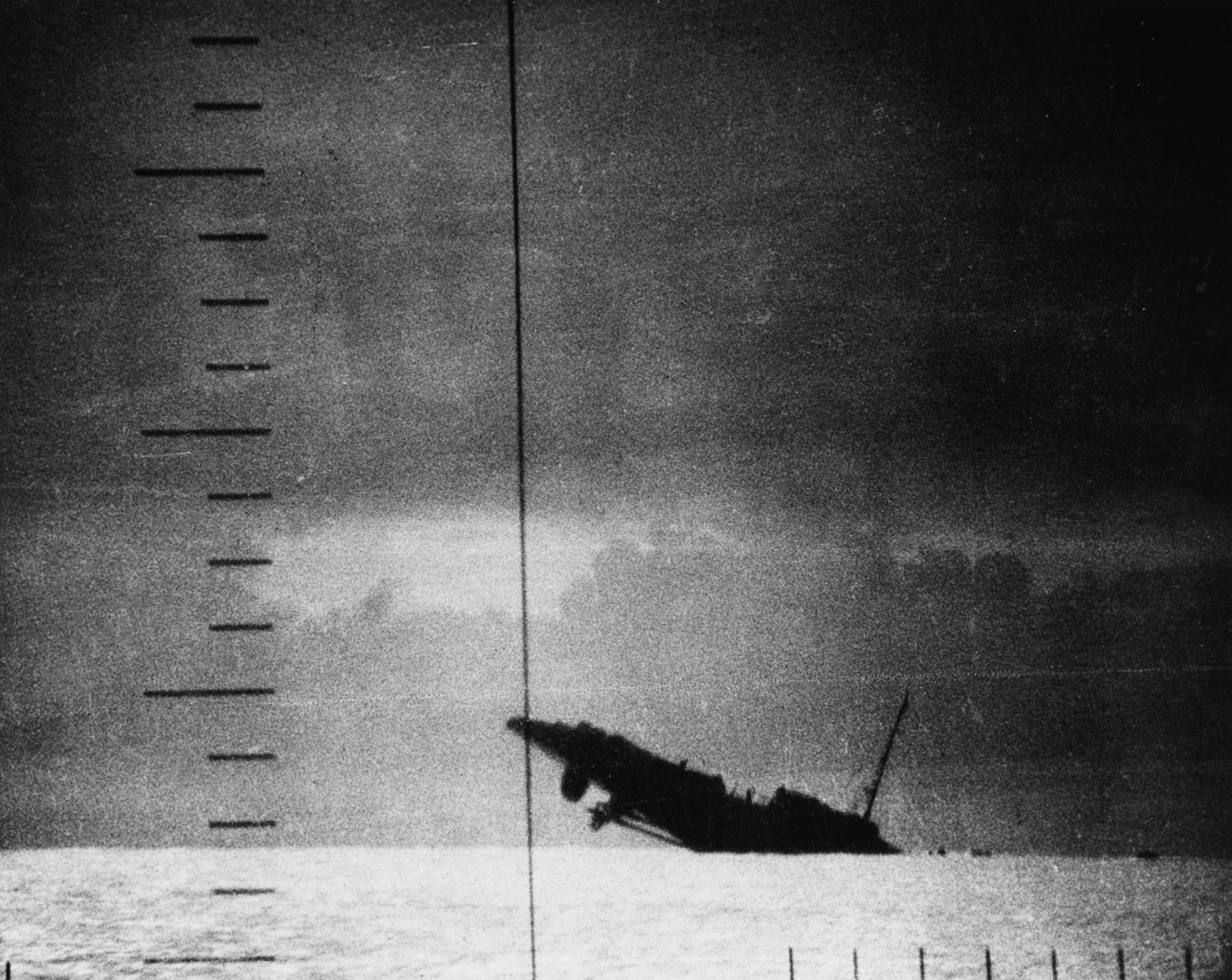
Patrol Boat No. 39 sinking after being torpedoed by USS Seawolf on 23 April 1943.

Tade, built at the Fujinagata Shipyards in Osaka, was laid down on 20 December 1920, launched on 15 March 1922 and completed on 31 July 1922. During 1940, she was converted into a patrol boat and was renamed Patrol Boat No. 39 on 1 April 1940. The ship was torpedoed and sunk in the Philippine Sea south of Yonaguni at 23.45°N 122.45°E by the United States Navy submarine USS Seawolf on 23 April 1943. She was struck from the naval list on 1 July 1943.
