= Japanese destroyer Yomogi =

Destroyer of the Imperial Japanese Navy

Coordinates: 20°12′N 121°54′E

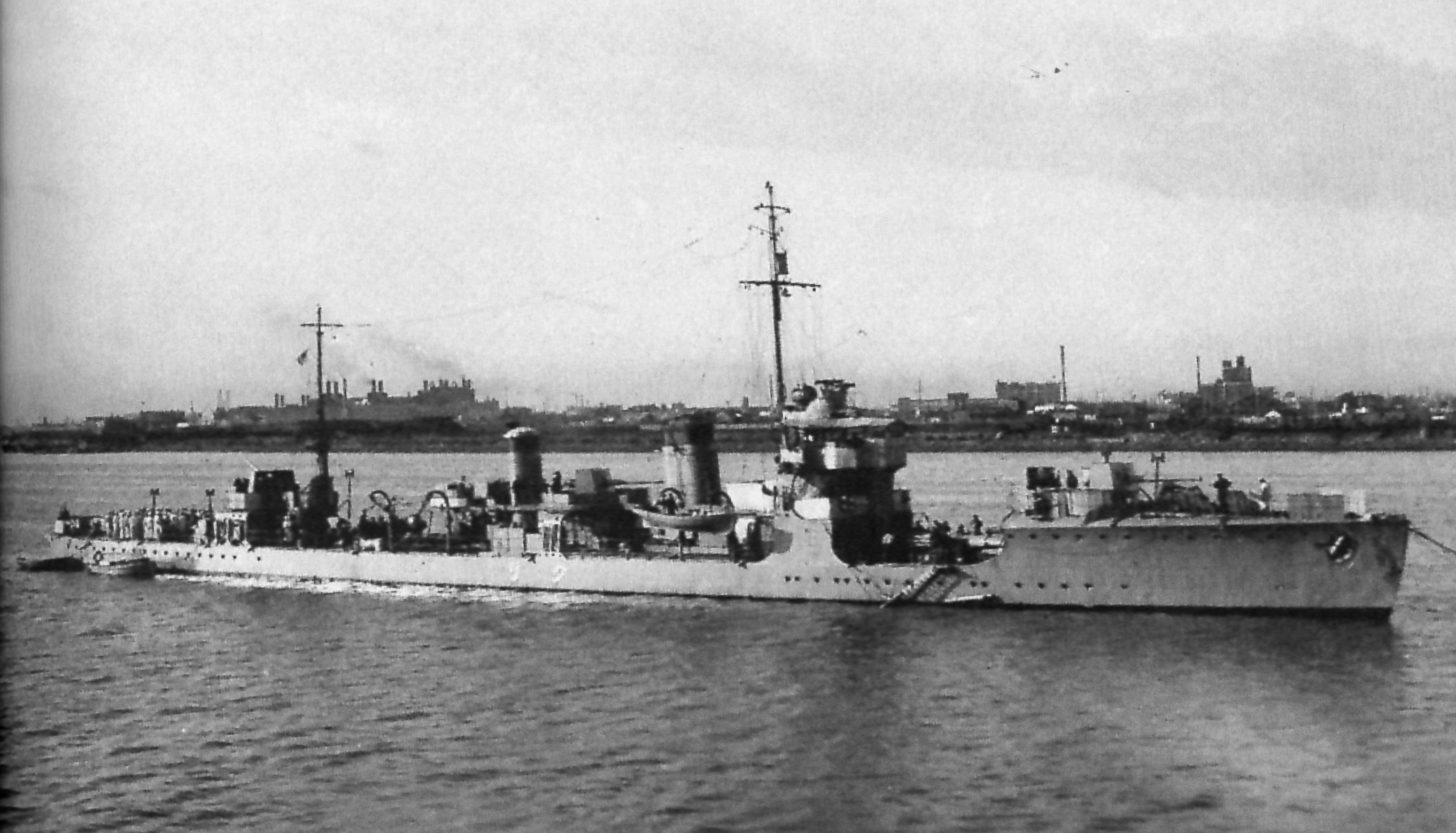
- Sister ship Kuri at anchor, 1937

History

Empire of Japan
- Name: Yomogi
- Builder: Ishikawajima, Tokyo
- Laid down: 26 February 1921
- Launched: 14 March 1922
- Completed: 19 August 1922
- Reclassified: As Patrol Boat No. 38, 1 April 1940
- Stricken: 10 March 1945
- Fate: Torpedoed by USS Atule, 25 November 1944

General characteristics (as built)
- Type: Momi-class destroyer
- Displacement: 850 long tons (864 t) (normal); 1,020 long tons (1,036 t) (deep load)
- Length: 275 ft (83.8 m) (pp); 280 ft (85.3 m) (o/a)
- Beam: 26 ft (7.9 m)
- Draft: 8 ft (2.4 m)
- Installed power: 3 × Kampon water-tube boilers; 21,500 shp (16,000 kW)
- Propulsion: 2 shafts; 2 × geared steam turbines
- Speed: 36 knots (67 km/h; 41 mph)
- Range: 3,000 nmi (5,600 km; 3,500 mi) at 15 knots (28 km/h; 17 mph)
- Complement: 110
- Armament: 3 × single 12 cm (4.7 in) guns; 2 × twin 533 mm (21 in) torpedo tubes

The Japanese destroyer Yomogi (薄) was one of 21 Momi-class destroyers built for the Imperial Japanese Navy (IJN) in the late 1910s. In 1940, she was converted to Patrol Boat No. 38. The ship was torpedoed in the Bashi Strait by USS Atule on November 25, 1944, and stricken from the navy list on March 10, 1945.

== Design and description ==
The Momi class was designed with higher speed and better seakeeping than the preceding Enoki-class second-class destroyers. The ships had an overall length of 280 feet (85.3 m) and were 275 feet (83.8 m) between perpendiculars. They had a beam of 26 feet (7.9 m), and a mean draft of 8 feet (2.4 m). The Momi-class ships displaced 850 long tons (864 t) at standard load and 1,020 long tons (1,036 t) at deep load. Yomogi was powered by two Zoelly geared steam turbines, each driving one propeller shaft using steam provided by three Kampon water-tube boilers. The turbines were designed to produce 21,500 shaft horsepower (16,000 kW) to give the ships a speed of 36 knots (67 km/h; 41 mph). The ships carried a maximum of 275 long tons (279 t) of fuel oil which gave them a range of 3,000 nautical miles (5,600 km; 3,500 mi) at 15 knots (28 km/h; 17 mph). Their crew consisted of 110 officers and crewmen.

The main armament of the Momi-class ships consisted of three 12-centimeter (4.7 in) Type 3 guns in single mounts; one gun forward of the well deck, one between the two funnels, and the last gun atop the aft superstructure. The guns were numbered '1' to '3' from front to rear. The ships carried two above-water twin sets of 533-millimeter (21 in) torpedo tubes; one mount was in the well deck between the forward superstructure and the bow gun and the other between the aft funnel and aft superstructure.

In 1940, Yomogi was converted into a patrol boat. Her torpedo tubes, minesweeping gear, and aft 12 cm gun were removed in exchange for two triple mounts for license-built 25 mm (1 in) Type 96 light AA guns and 60 depth charges. In addition one boiler was removed, which reduced her speed to 18 knots (33 km/h; 21 mph) from 12,000 shp (8,900 kW). These changes made her top heavy and ballast had to be added which increased her displacement to 950 metric tons (935 long tons).

== Construction and career ==
Yomogi, built at the Ishikawajima shipyard in Tokyo, was laid down on 26 February 1921, launched on 14 March 1922, and completed on 19 August 1922. In 1940, she was converted into patrol boat and she was renamed Patrol Boat No. 38 (第三十八号哨戒艇, Dai-38-Gō shōkaitei) on 1 April 1940: She was torpedoed in the Bashi Channel by the United States Navy submarine USS Atule on 25 November 1944 and was struck from the navy list on 10 March 1945.
