= Japanese ship Nire =

Several ships have been named Nire (楡 / にれ, "elm") :

- Japanese destroyer Nire (1919), a Momi-class destroyer of the Imperial Japanese Navy; decommissioned and converted to training ship in February 1940; re-converted to auxiliary ship Tomariura No.1 (第一泊浦, Daiichi Tomariura) in December 1944 during World War II
- Japanese destroyer Nire (1944), a Tachibana-class destroyer of the Imperial Japanese Navy during World War II
- JDS Nire (PF-287), a Kusu-class patrol frigate of the Japan Maritime Self-Defense Force, formerly USS Sandusky (PF-54)
