= Japanese destroyer Sumire (1921) =

Destroyer of the Imperial Japanese Navy

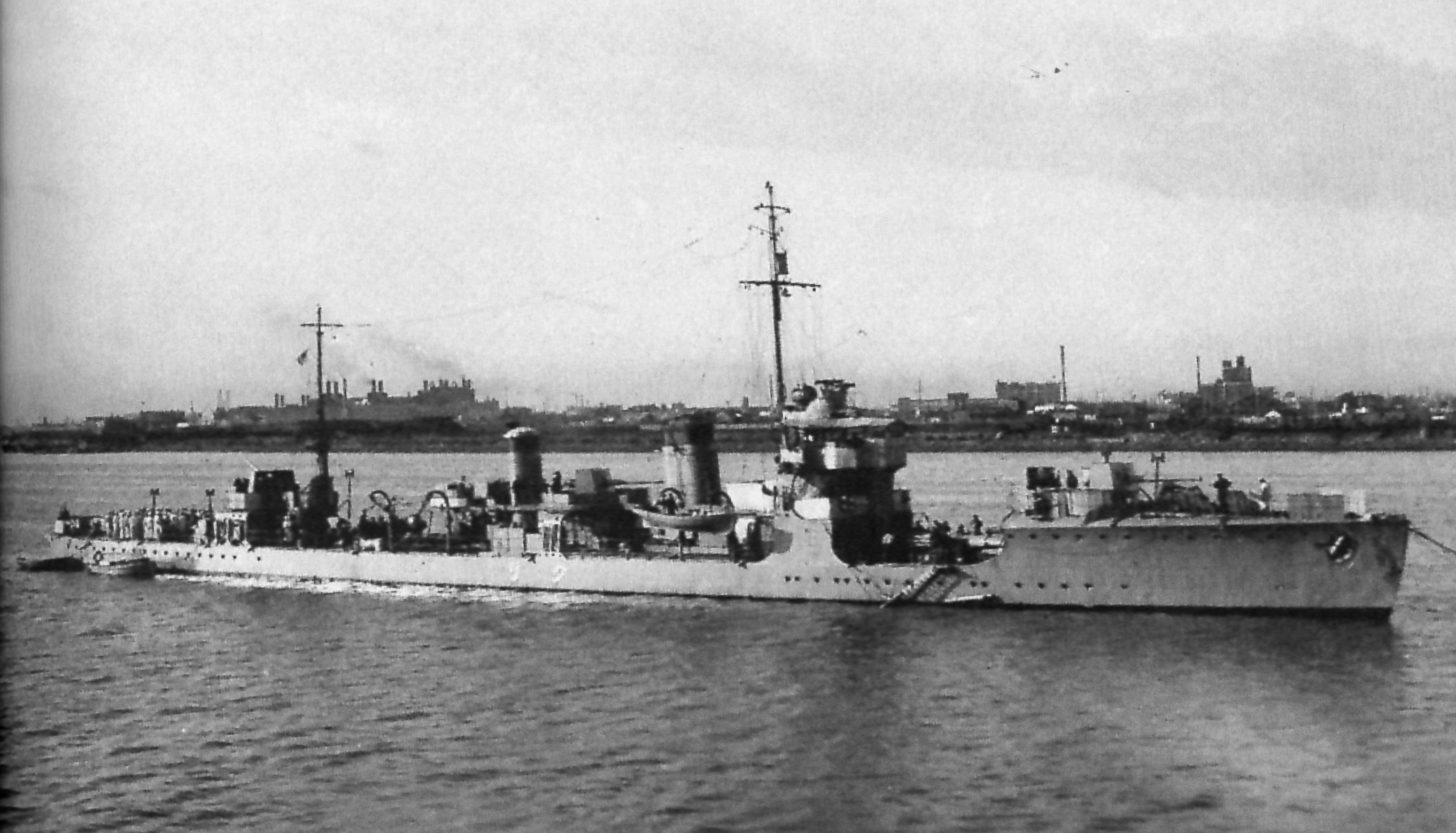
- Sister ship Kuri at anchor, 1937

History

Empire of Japan
- Name: Sumire
- Builder: Ishikawajima, Tokyo
- Laid down: 24 November 1920
- Launched: 14 December 1921
- Completed: 31 March 1923
- Fate: Decommissioned 1 February 1940; converted to training ship, re-converted to auxiliary ship Mitaka (三高) 23 February 1945; scrapped 1948.

General characteristics (as built)
- Type: Momi-class destroyer
- Displacement: 850 long tons (864 t) (normal); 1,020 long tons (1,036 t) (deep load)
- Length: 275 ft (83.8 m) (pp); 280 ft (85.3 m) (o/a)
- Beam: 26 ft (7.9 m)
- Draft: 8 ft (2.4 m)
- Installed power: 3 × Kampon water-tube boilers; 21,500 shp (16,000 kW)
- Propulsion: 2 shafts; 2 × geared steam turbines
- Speed: 36 knots (67 km/h; 41 mph)
- Range: 3,000 nmi (5,600 km; 3,500 mi) at 15 knots (28 km/h; 17 mph)
- Complement: 110
- Armament: 3 × single 12 cm (4.7 in) guns; 2 × twin 533 mm (21 in) torpedo tubes

The Japanese destroyer Sumire (菫) was one of 21 Momi-class destroyers built for the Imperial Japanese Navy (IJN) in the late 1910s. In 1940, she was decommissioned and then converted into a training ship, before later being re-converted into the auxiliary ship Mitaka (三高) on February 23, 1945. She was finally scrapped in 1948.

== Design and description ==
The Momi class was designed with higher speed and better seakeeping than the preceding Enoki-class second-class destroyers. The ships had an overall length of 280 feet (85.3 m) and were 275 feet (83.8 m) between perpendiculars. They had a beam of 26 feet (7.9 m), and a mean draft of 8 feet (2.4 m). The Momi-class ships displaced 850 long tons (864 t) at standard load and 1,020 long tons (1,036 t) at deep load. Sumire was powered by two Zoelly geared steam turbines, each driving one propeller shaft using steam provided by three Kampon water-tube boilers. The turbines were designed to produce 21,500 shaft horsepower (16,000 kW) to give the ships a speed of 36 knots (67 km/h; 41 mph). The ships carried a maximum of 275 long tons (279 t) of fuel oil which gave them a range of 3,000 nautical miles (5,600 km; 3,500 mi) at 15 knots (28 km/h; 17 mph). Their crew consisted of 110 officers and crewmen.

The main armament of the Momi-class ships consisted of three 12-centimeter (4.7 in) Type 3 guns in single mounts; one gun forward of the well deck, one between the two funnels, and the last gun atop the aft superstructure. The guns were numbered '1' to '3' from front to rear. The ships carried two above-water twin sets of 533-millimeter (21 in) torpedo tubes; one mount was in the well deck between the forward superstructure and the bow gun and the other between the aft funnel and aft superstructure.

== Construction and career ==
Sumire, built at the Ishikawajima shipyard in Tokyo, was laid down on November 24, 1920, launched on December 14, 1921, and completed on March 31, 1923. She serviced in her role for 17 years before being decommissioned on February 1, 1940. She was then converted into a training ship and later re-converted into the auxiliary ship Mitaka (三高) on February 23, 1945. She survived World War II to be surrendered and was scrapped in 1948.
