= Japanese destroyer Enoki =

Two Japanese destroyers have been named Enoki:

- Japanese destroyer Enoki (1918), an Enoki-class destroyer launched in 1918. She was rerated as a minesweeper and renamed W-10 in 1930 before being stricken in 1936.
- Japanese destroyer Enoki (1945), a Tachibana-class destroyer both launched and sunk in 1945
