= Sumire (disambiguation) =

Sumire is a feminine Japanese given name.

Sumire may also refer to:

- Sumire, the common Japanese name of Viola mandshurica
- "Sumire", a 2003 song on the Japanese band Yuzu
- "Sumire", a song on The Gazette's 2004 album Madara
- Sumire, the project code name of the Sony Xperia Z5 smartphone
- Japanese destroyer Sumire, two ships of the Imperial Japanese Navy

== People with the surname ==
- María Sumire, Peruvian politician and member of Union for Peru party

== See also ==
- "Sumire September Love", a 1982 song by Ippu-Do, covered by Shazna in 1997 and Megamasso in 2011
- Sumire 16 sai!!, a Japanese manga and TV drama series
