= Japanese destroyer Sumire =

Two ships of the Japanese Navy have been named Sumire:

- Japanese destroyer Sumire (1921), a Momi-class destroyer launched in 1919 and used as a training ship after being decommissioned in 1940. Renamed Mitaka in 1945 and scrapped in 1948.
- Japanese destroyer Sumire (1944), a Tachibana-class destroyer launched in 1944 and expended as a target in 1947
