= Momi-class destroyer =

Class of Imperial Japanese destroyers

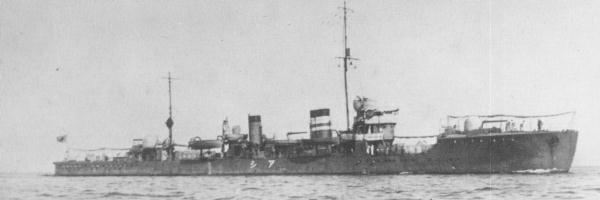
- Ashi

Class overview
- Name: Momi class
- Builders: Kawasaki Dockyard Co. (6); Tōkyō Ishikawajima Shipyard (4); Uraga Dock Company (4); Fujinagata Shipyards (3); Kure Naval Arsenal (2); Yokosuka Naval Arsenal (2)
- Operators: Imperial Japanese Navy
- Preceded by: Kawakaze class
- Succeeded by: Minekaze class
- Built: 1918–1923
- In commission: 1919–1946
- Planned: 28
- Completed: 21
- Cancelled: 7
- Lost: 11
- Scrapped: 10

General characteristics as built
- Type: Destroyer
- Displacement: 864 t (850 long tons) (normal); 1,036 t (1,020 long tons) (deep load)
- Length: 83.8 m (275 ft) (pp); 85.3 m (280 ft) (o/a)
- Beam: 7.9 m (26 ft)
- Draft: 2.4 m (8 ft)
- Installed power: 21,500 shp (16,000 kW); 3 × Kampon water-tube boilers
- Propulsion: 2 shafts; 2 × Parsons steam turbines
- Speed: 36 knots (67 km/h; 41 mph)
- Range: 3,000 nmi (5,600 km; 3,500 mi) at 15 knots (28 km/h; 17 mph)
- Complement: 148
- Armament: 3 × single 12 cm (4.7 in) Type 3 guns; 2 × twin 53.3 cm (21.0 in) torpedo tubes

The Momi-class destroyers were a class of twenty-one second-class destroyers of the Imperial Japanese Navy. All were named for plants. Obsolete by the beginning of the Pacific War, the Momis were relegated to mostly secondary roles, with some vessels serving throughout the war as patrol vessels or high speed transports.

== Background ==
Construction of the medium-sized Momi-class destroyers was authorized as part of the Imperial Japanese Navy's 8-4 Fleet Program from fiscal 1918–1920, as an accompaniment to the larger Minekaze class with which they shared many common design characteristics. These vessels were produced at several shipyards around Japan, and when formed into attack squadrons of two to four vessels, made up the backbone of the inter-war Imperial Japanese Navy.

The final seven vessels planned for this series were cancelled, and re-ordered as the new Wakatake-class destroyers in 1919, and by the mid-1920s the concept of the "second-class destroyer" had fallen out of favor due to the greater capabilities offered by the new generation of fleet destroyers.

== Initial design ==
The Momi class was a development of the Enoki second-class destroyers, relying on the same basic hull. They were quite small, comparable to Royal Navy corvettes. The design incorporated features discovered on German destroyers awarded as reparations from World War I, including a lengthened forecastle with a break forming a well deck immediately forward of the bridge, and a front gun battery placed on a pedestal on the centerline so that it could be operated in heavy weather. This arrangement also offered the advantage of a low, semi protected area for the forward torpedo tubes albeit at the cost of becoming awash in heavy seas. Initial problems with stability during high-speed turns were later corrected by widening the beam and bringing up the waterline.

When compared with the Minekaze class, the smaller size necessitated a reduction from four boilers to three and the adoption of lighter-weight Parsons direct-drive turbines, resulting in a drop from 38,500 hp in the Minekaze class to 21,500 hp (16,000 kW) in the Momi class. In addition, fuel capacity was lowered to 275 tons of oil fuel.

As gear turbine technology was not yet perfected, the navy experimented with a variety of power plants on the Momi class:

Turbines	Equipment for
Brown-Curtis turbines	Kaya, Warabi and Tade
Parsons impulse turbines	Hishi and Hasu
Escher Wyss & Cie Zoelly turbines	Sumire
Mitsubishi Shipbuilding High-pressure impulse turbine and low-pressure reaction turbine	Kaki
Kampon turbines	all others

The Momi class was heavily armed for its small displacement, with a main battery of Type 3 120 mm 45 caliber naval guns, the same as was used on the Minekaze-class, and a set of double torpedo launchers. Anti-aircraft protection was provided by two 7.7mm machine guns.

== Early operational history ==
Due to their shallow draft, the Momi-class destroyers proved to be excellent for operation in coastal waters, and were used along the coast of China to support amphibious landings during the Second Sino-Japanese War.

A number of the Momi-class vessels were lost or disposed during the interwar period. Momi herself was turned over to trials in 1932, while Warabi was run down by the cruiser Jintsu on 27 August 1927 off Maizuru, Kyoto. Kaya and Nashi were scrapped in 1939.

Also in 1939, Aoi, Fuji, Hagi, Hishi, Kiku, Satsuki, Tade, Tsuta and Yomogi were removed from front line combat service and converted into patrol vessels. In 1940, Ashi, Kaki, Nine, Sumire, and Take were disarmed, and re-rated as training ships.

By the time of the Pacific War, the Momi-class was reaching the end of its service life, and only three (Tsuga, Hasu and Kuri) remained in service as destroyers. An effort was made to upgrade their capabilities by removing the minesweeping gear from the stern and replacing with 36 to 48 depth charges and four depth charge launchers. The amidships Type 3 guns was replaced by two triple Type 96 AA guns from 1942 to 1943, and a Type 13 radar was added. Tsuga was sunk by air attack 15 January 1945. Hasu was surrendered and scrapped at the end of the war. Kuri was surrendered, but sank after striking a mine off Korea on 8 October 1945.

== As patrol boats ==
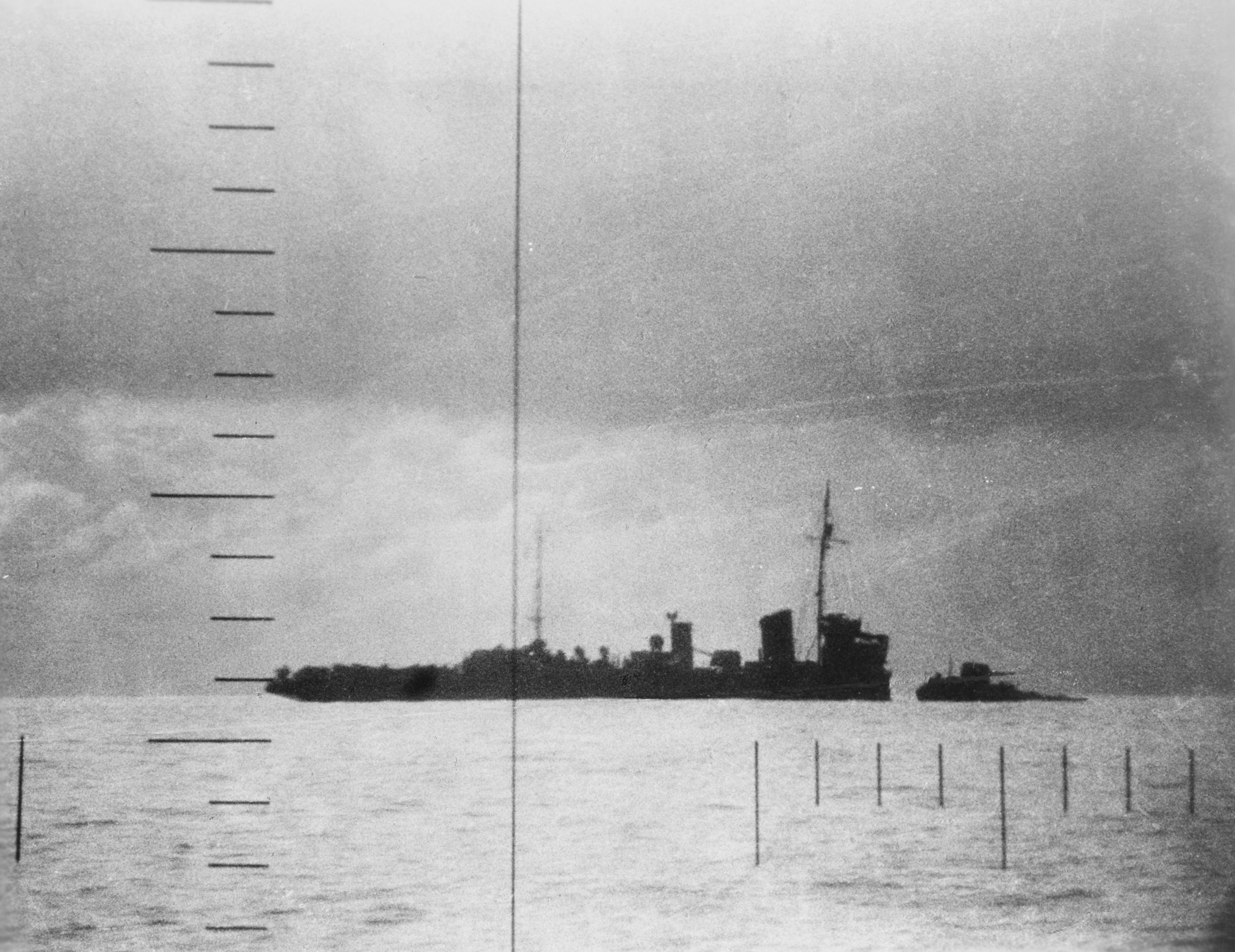
Periscope photo of Patrol Boat #39 (Japanese escort vessel, originally the destroyer Tade, 1922) sinking after being torpedoed by Seawolf on 23 April 1943

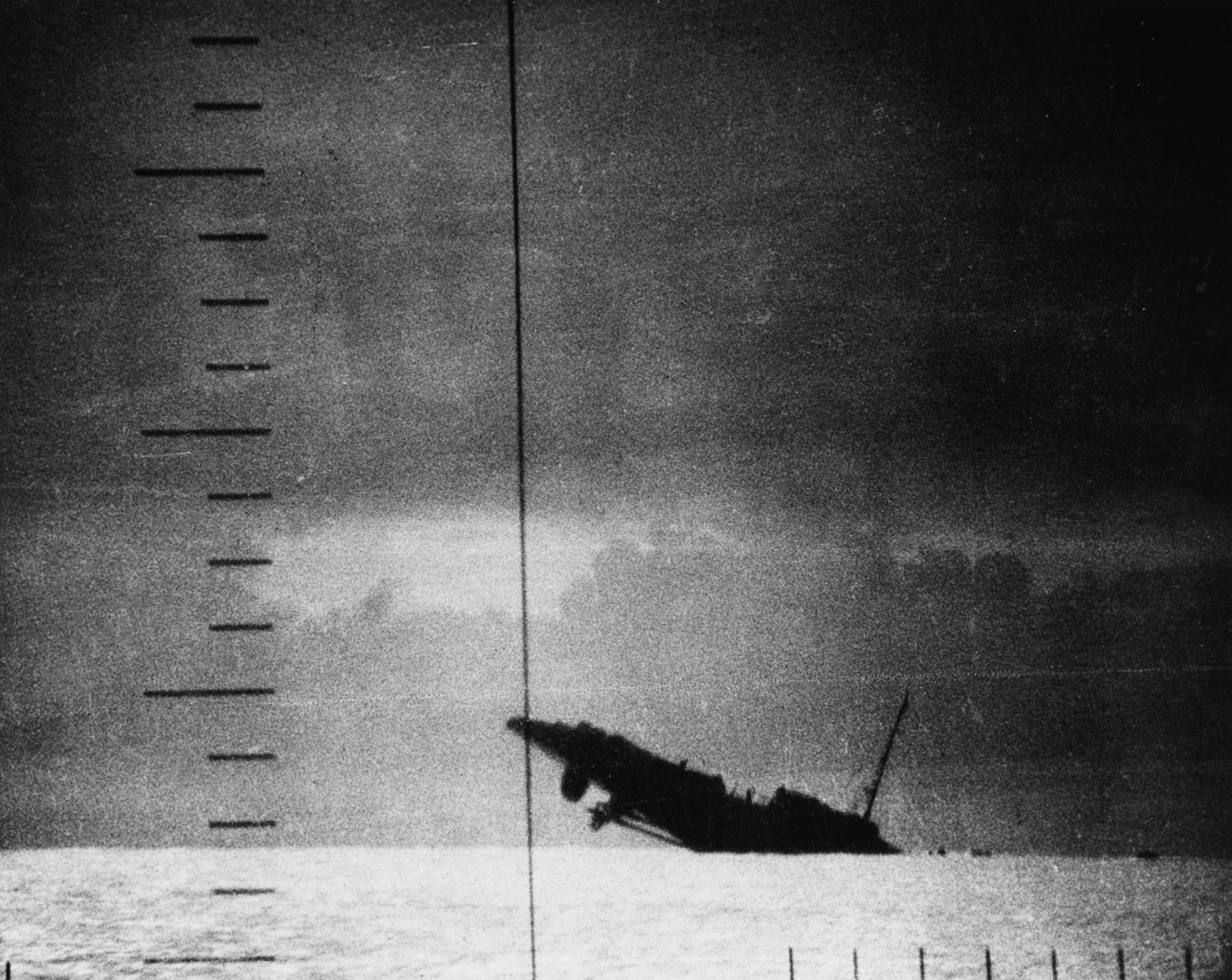
Patrol Boat No. 39 (ex-Tade)

Beginning in 1939, nine Momi-class vessels were re-classified as patrol boats and converted for escort duty, having one boiler removed (dropping their power to 12,000 ihp (8,900 kW) and speed to just 18 knots (21 mph; 33 km/h). Their torpedo tubes, minesweeping gear, and the amidships Type 3 gun mount were replaced by six Type 96 AA guns, 36 depth charges, and three depth charge throwers. As well, their names were dropped and they were simply numbered.

During 1941–1942, these vessels were modified again, to carry and launch a Toku Daihatsu-class landing craft, by having the aft smokestack removed and the stern modified with a sloping deck to the waterline, as well as providing accommodation for 150 naval infantry troops. All of these vessels except ex-Fuji (as Patrol Boat #36) were sunk during the course of the Pacific War.

== List of ships ==
Construction data
Name	Kanji	Builder	Laid down	Launched	Completed	Fate
Momi	樅	Yokosuka Naval Arsenal, Japan	23 January 1918	10 June 1919	27 December 1919	Decommissioned, 1 April 1932; renamed Disposal Destroyer No.2 (廃駆二号, Haiku 2-Gō); used for trials to 1936
Kaya	榧	Yokosuka Naval Arsenal, Japan	23 December 1918	10 June 1919	28 March 1920	Decommissioned, 1 February 1940 and scrapped
Nashi	梨	Kawasaki Shipyards, Kobe, Japan	2 February 1918	26 August 1919	10 December 1919	Decommissioned, 1 February 1940 and scrapped
Take	竹	Kawasaki Shipyards, Kobe, Japan	2 December 1918	26 August 1919	25 December 1919	Decommissioned, 1 February 1940; converted to training ship; scuttled as breakwater at Akita port in 1948
Kaki	柿	Uraga Dock Company, Japan	27 February 1919	20 October 1919	2 August 1920	Decommissioned, 1 April 1940; converted to training ship; re-converted to auxiliary ship Ōsu (大須) 23 February 1945; scrapped 1948
Tsuga	栂	Ishikawajima Shipyards, Japan	5 March 1919	17 April 1920	20 June 1920	Sunk off Taiwan, 15 January 1945, in air attack; struck 10 March 1945
Nire	楡	Kure Naval Arsenal, Japan	5 September 1919	22 December 1919	31 March 1920	Decommissioned, 1 February 1940; converted to training ship, re-converted to auxiliary ship No.1 Tomariura (第一泊浦, Dai-1 Tomariura) 15 December 1944; scrapped 1948
Kuri	栗	Kure Naval Arsenal, Japan	5 December 1919	19 March 1920	30 April 1920	Mined off Pusan, 8 October 1945; struck 25 October 1945
Kiku	菊	Kawasaki Shipyards, Kobe, Japan	20 January 1920	13 October 1920	10 December 1920	Converted to Patrol Boat No.31 (第三十一号哨戒艇, Dai-31-Gō shōkaitei) 1 April 1940; sunk at Palau, 30 March 1944 by air attack; struck 10 May 1944
Aoi	葵	Kawasaki Shipyards, Kobe, Japan	1 April 1920	9 November 1920	10 December 1920	Converted to Patrol Boat No.32 (第三十二号哨戒艇, Dai-32-Gō shōkaitei) 1 April 1940; grounded 23 December 1941 at Wake Island; struck 15 January 1942
Hagi	萩	Uraga Dock Company, Japan	28 February 1920	29 October 1920	20 April 1921	Converted to Patrol Boat No.33 (第三十三号哨戒艇, Dai-33-Gō shōkaitei) 1 April 1940; grounded 23 December 1941 at Wake Island; struck 15 January 1942
Fuji	藤	Fujinagata Shipyards, Japan	6 December 1919	27 November 1920	31 May 1921	Converted to Patrol Boat No.36 (第三十六号哨戒艇, Dai-36-Gō shōkaitei) 1 April 1940; surrendered to Netherlands in July 1946 at Surabaya; scrapped 10 August 1946
Susuki	薄	Ishikawajima Shipyards, Japan	3 May 1920	21 February 1921	25 May 1921	Converted to Patrol Boat No.34 (第三十四号哨戒艇, Dai-34-Gō shōkaitei) 1 April 1940; sunk 6 March 1943 in collision with Yakaze off Kavien; written off 10 January 1945.
Hishi	菱	Uraga Dock Company, Japan	10 November 1920	9 May 1921	23 March 1922	Converted to Patrol Boat No.37 (第三十七号哨戒艇, Dai-37-Gō shōkaitei) 1 April 1940; sunk off Borneo, by USS Pope 24 January 1942; struck 10 April 1942
Hasu	蓮	Uraga Dock Company, Japan	2 March 1921	8 December 1921	31 July 1922	Retired, 12 October 1945; scuttled as breakwater in Fukui, 1946
Warabi	蕨	Fujinagata Shipyards, Japan	12 October 1920	28 September 1921	19 December 1921	Sunk 24 August 1927 in collision with Jintsu off Cape Miho; struck 15 September 1927
Tade	蓼	Fujinagata Shipyards, Japan	20 December 1920	15 March 1921	31 July 1922	Converted to Patrol Boat No.39 (第三十九号哨戒艇, Dai-39-Gō shōkaitei) 1 April 1940; torpedoed off Yonaguni by USS Seawolf (SS-197) 23 April 1943; struck 1 July 1943
Sumire	菫	Ishikawajima Shipyards, Japan	24 November 1920	14 December 1921	31 March 1923	Decommissioned, 1 February 1940; converted to training ship, re-converted to auxiliary ship Mitaka (三高) 23 February 1945; scrapped 1948
Tsuta	蔦	Kawasaki Shipyards, Kobe, Japan	16 October 1920	9 May 1921	30 June 1921	Converted to Patrol Boat No.35 (第三十五号哨戒艇, Dai-35-Gō shōkaitei) 1 April 1940; sunk at Lae by air attack 2 September 1942; struck 10 February 1943
Ashi	葦	Kawasaki Shipyards, Kobe, Japan	15 November 1920	3 September 1921	29 October 1921	Decommissioned, 1 February 1940; converted to training ship, re-converted to auxiliary ship No.2 Tomariura (第二泊浦, Dai-2 Tomariura) 15 December 1944; modified to Shin'yō suicide motorboat mothership 1945, scrapped 1947
Yomogi	蓬	Ishikawajima Shipyards, Japan	26 February 1921	14 March 1922	19 August 1922	Converted to Patrol Boat No.38 (第三十八号哨戒艇, Dai-38-Gō shōkaitei) 1 April 1940: torpedoed Bashi Strait by USS Atule 25 November 1944; struck 10 March 1945
