= 12 cm/45 3rd Year Type naval gun =

Naval and coastal defense gun

Type 3 120 mm 45 caliber naval gun
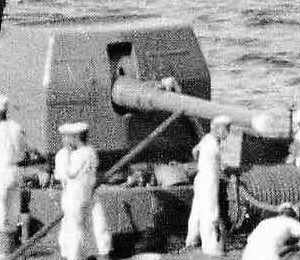
- Bow gun on Yūnagi, September 1936
- Type: Naval gun Coast defense gun
- Place of origin: Japan

Service history
- In service: 1919–1945
- Used by: Imperial Japanese Navy; Manchukuo
- Wars: World War II

Production history
- Designed: 1895
- Variants: Type 11

Specifications
- Mass: 3,240 kg (7,140 lb)
- Barrel length: 5.4 m (18 ft) bore
- Shell: 120 x 550 mm.R. Separate loading cased charges and projectile
- Shell weight: 20.3 kg (45 lb)
- Caliber: 120 mm (4.72 in)
- Action: Manual
- Breech: Single motion interrupted screw Welin breech block
- Recoil: Hydro-pneumatic
- Elevation: -7° – +33°
- Traverse: +120°- 120°
- Rate of fire: 5–6 rpm
- Muzzle velocity: 825 m/s (2,710 ft/s)
- Effective firing range: 16 km (10 mi) at 33°

12 cm/45 3rd Year Type naval gun was a Japanese naval gun and coast defense gun used on destroyers, and torpedo boats of the Imperial Japanese Navy during World War II.

== Design and development ==
The 12 cm/45 gun designed in 1895 was an indigenous variant of an Elswick Ordnance Company export design known as the Pattern Y. The Japanese designation was the "Type 41". Later in 1921 the 12 cm/45 gun was used as the basis for a high-angle anti-aircraft gun, designated the 12 cm/45 10th Year Type. The "Third Year Type" refers to the Welin breech block used and this should not be confused with the later Type 3 12 cm AA Gun developed by the Imperial Japanese Army in 1943. In the Japanese Army artillery naming system, "Type 3" refers to the year of introduction, rather than the type of breech block used. When used in naval applications, it was mounted in a shielded barbette, as shown.

A redesign in 1922 called the 12 cm 11th Year Type naval gun (Model 1922) with a shorter gun barrel and a horizontal sliding breech-block was used on submarines and torpedo boats. The 12 cm/45 was manually loaded and fired a 20.3 kg (45 lb) high-explosive, an illumination shell or after 1943 an anti-submarine shell.

In addition to its shipboard role it was widely deployed as a coastal defense gun for Japanese bases in the Pacific and was one of the more common types found by Allied forces.

== Naval Use ==
- Chidori-class torpedo boat
- Etorofu-class escort ship
- Hashidate-class gunboat
- Kamikaze-class destroyer
- Kawakaze-class destroyer
- Minekaze-class destroyer
- Momi-class destroyer
- Mutsuki-class destroyer
- Shimushu-class escort ship
- Tsukushi-class survey ship
- Wakatake-class destroyer

== See also ==
=== Weapons of comparable role, performance and era ===
- BL 4.7 inch /45 naval gun: British equivalent
- 5"/51 caliber gun: US Navy equivalent

== Gallery ==
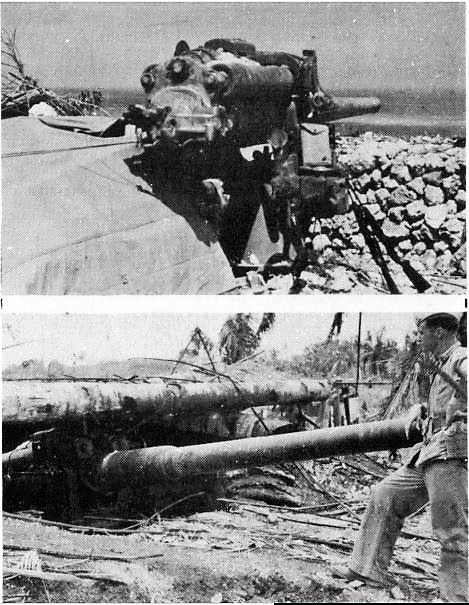
3rd Year Type guns used in a coastal defense role.

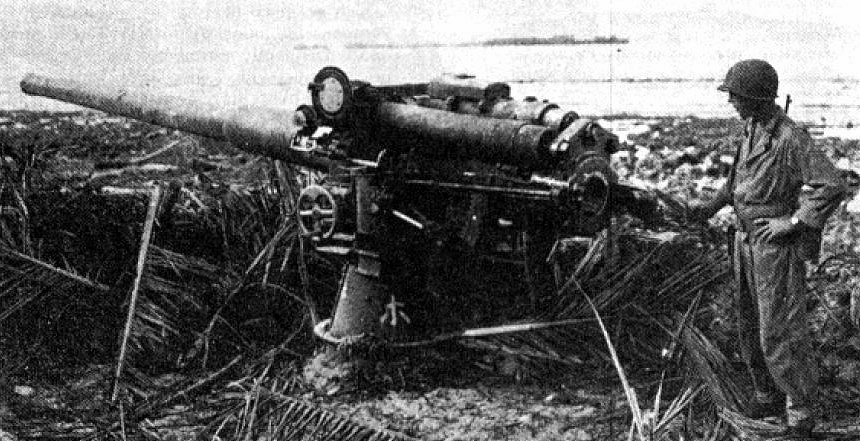

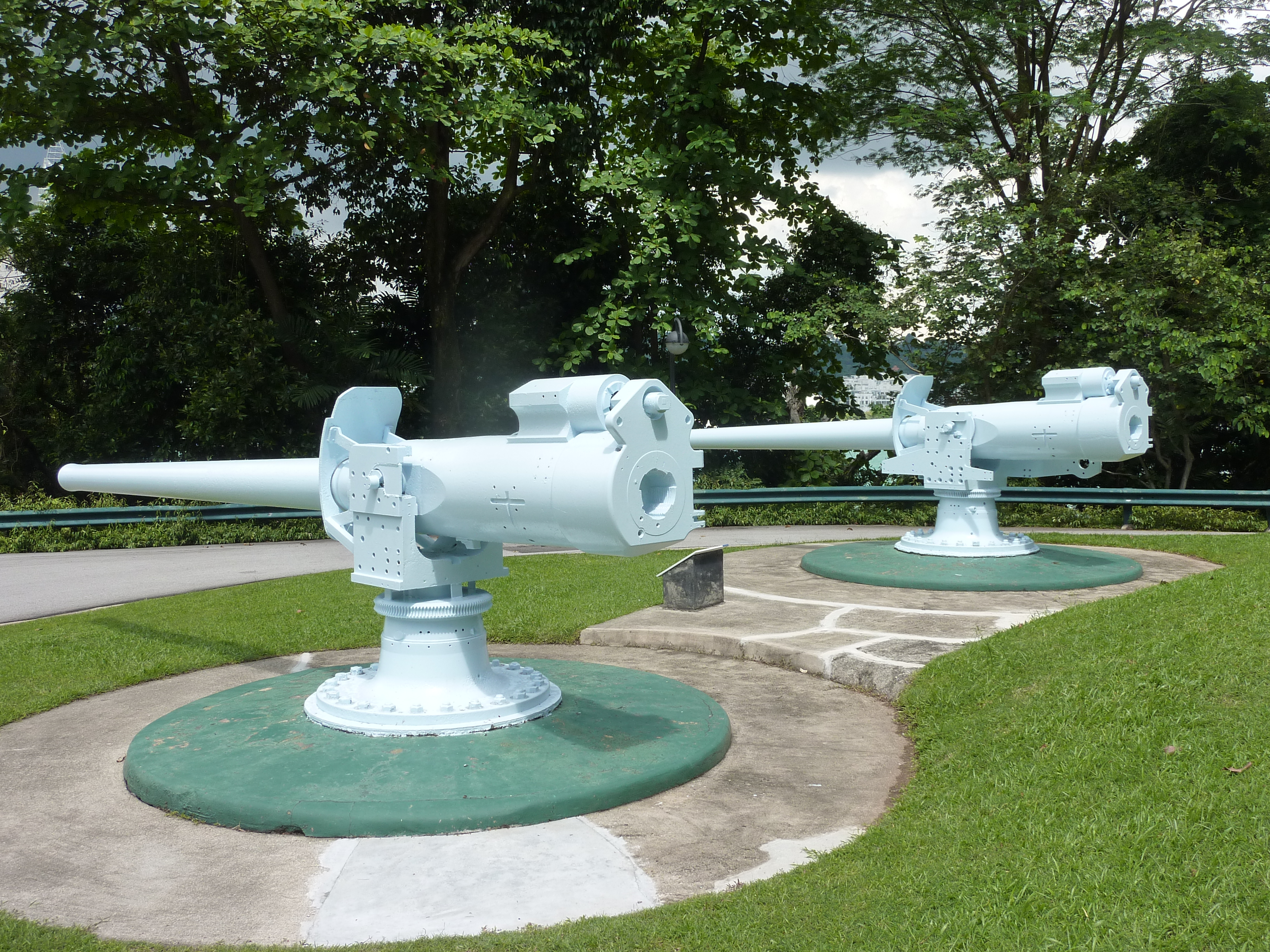
Two Japanese guns at Fort Siloso - Sentosa Island, Singapore.

== Bibliography ==
- Bishop, Chris (eds) The Encyclopedia of Weapons of World War II. Barnes & Nobel. 1998. ISBN 0-7607-1022-8
- Campbell, John (1985). Naval Weapons of World War Two. Annapolis, Maryland: Naval Institute Press. ISBN 0-87021-459-4.
- Chant, Chris. Artillery of World War II, Zenith Press, 2001, ISBN 0-7603-1172-2
- Friedman, Norman (2011). Naval Weapons of World War One: Guns, Torpedoes, Mines and ASW Weapons of All Nations; An Illustrated Directory. Barnsley, UK: Seaforth Publishing. ISBN 978-1-84832-100-7.
