= Well deck =

Decks lower than fore and aft on a ship

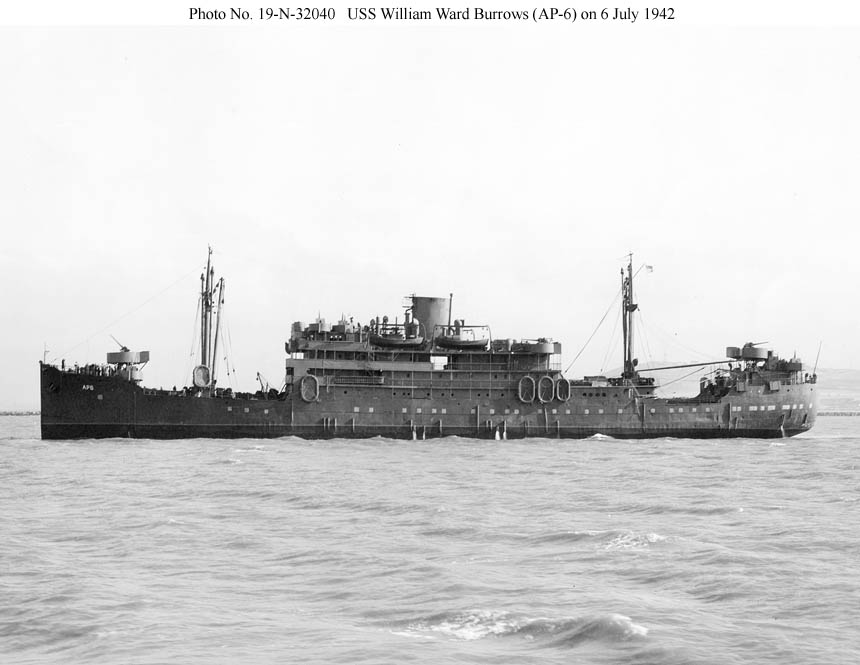
USS William Ward Burrows on 6 July 1942. Her 3"/23 guns have been replaced with 3"/50 guns and the sponson in the forward well deck for the 50-foot motor launches has been removed. (The aft well deck is clearly visible forward of the poop.)

In traditional nautical use, well decks were decks lower than decks fore and aft, usually at the main deck level, so that breaks appear in the main deck profile, as opposed to a flush deck profile. The term goes back to the days of sail. Late-20th-century commercial and military amphibious ships have applied the term to an entirely different type of hangar-like structure, evolving from exaggerated deep "well decks" of World War II amphibious vessels, that can be flooded for lighters or landing craft.

== Traditional ==
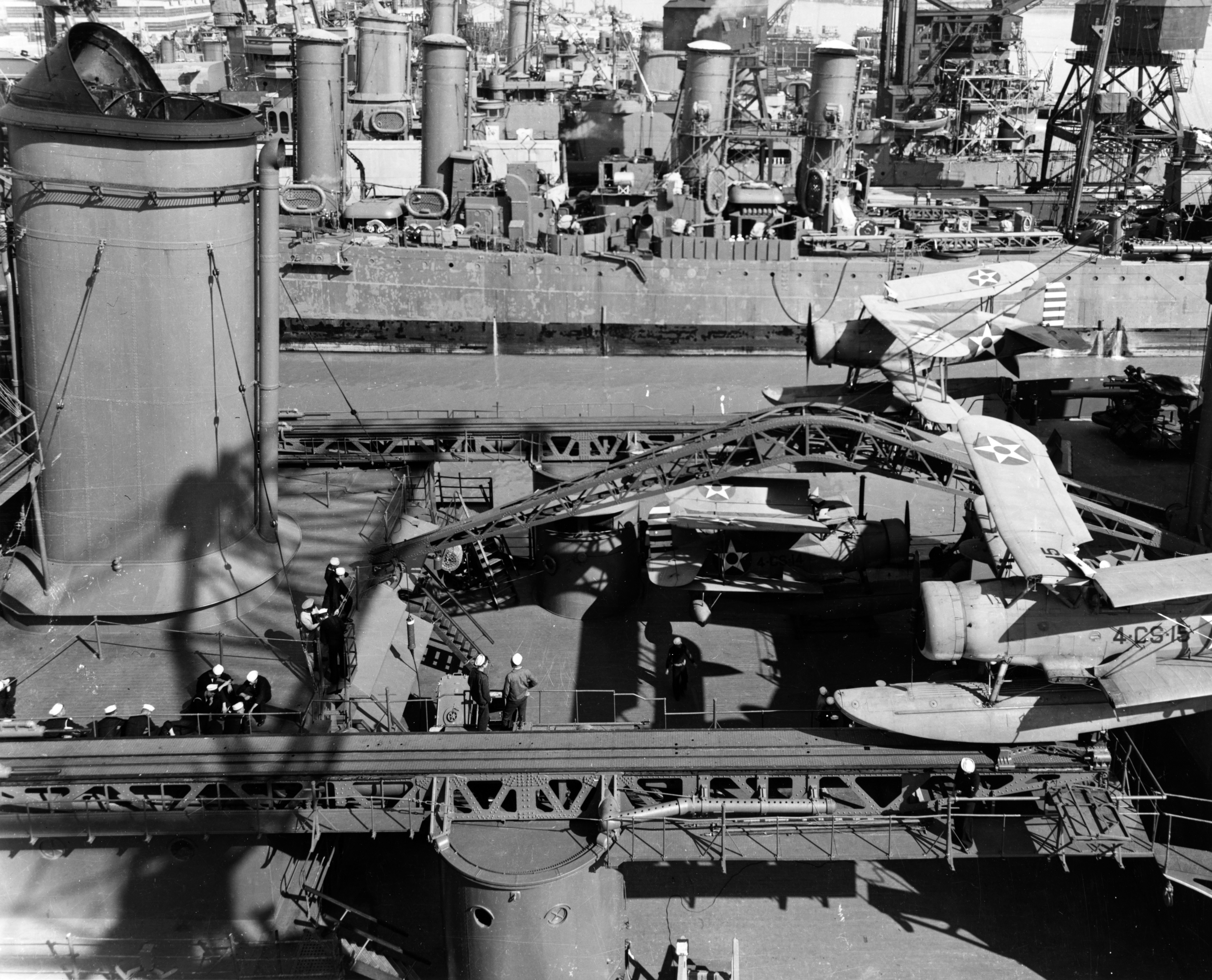
The USS Indianapolis being overhauled at the Mare Island Navy Yard, 19 April 1942. Closeup view of her well deck area, from the port side. Note her forward smokestack, catapults, and Curtiss SOC Seagull aircraft.

A well deck is an exposed deck (weather deck) lower than decks fore and aft. In particular, it is one enclosed by bulwarks limiting flow of water and thus drainage so that design requirements are specific about drainage and maintenance of such drainage with that definition applying even to small vessels. The United States Coast Guard, Sector Upper Mississippi River, Small Passenger Vessel Information Package notes:

'Well deck' means a weather deck fitted with solid bulwarks that impede the drainage of water over the sides or an exposed recess in the weather deck extending 1/2 or more of the length of the vessel over the weather deck.

Explicit requirements exist for drainage requirements on ships with well decks. On many vessels the cargo hatches and cargo handling booms and winches were located on the well decks between a central superstructure and raised forecastle and stern.

Naval vessels into the World War II era often had well decks between stacks with the space sometimes reserved for aircraft and catapults as seen in the photograph of the USS Indianapolis's well deck (note ladders down into the well deck from surrounding decks).

In commercial ship design categories, the "well deck ship" type the profile of the main deck line is broken rather than being flush or unbroken from bow to stern. The earliest cargo steamers were flush deck with openings below rimmed only with low casings. Later designs eliminated this design as dangerous with bulwarks and eventual evolution into the "three island" design (Note: The "three island ship design goes back to the late age of sail as is seen in Preußen. The design can more clearly be seen in the photograph of the USS William Ward Burrows (AP-6) here.) with raised forecastle, central bridge and poop superstructures and well decks between.

The well decks of passenger liners were often for the lowest class passengers' use, with the well deck of the Titanic reserved for third class passengers. By the mid-20th century the concept of well deck design in passenger liners was "old fashioned", and newer ships were designed with flush decks.

== Modern military ==
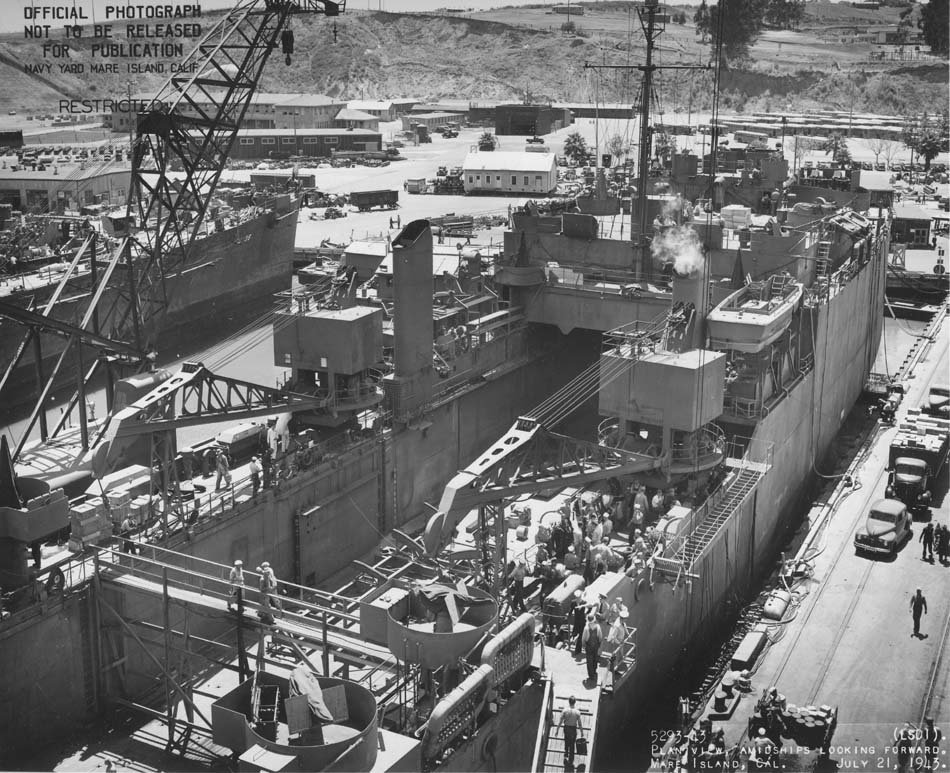
Overhead view of USS Ashland's well deck as she is moored pierside at Mare Island Navy Yard, 21 July 1943

In modern amphibious warfare usage, a well dock is a hangar-like deck located at the waterline in the stern of some amphibious warfare ships. By taking on water the ship can lower her stern, flooding the well deck and allowing boats, amphibious vehicles and landing craft to dock within the ship. In the United States Navy, this is referred to as a well deck, and officially termed a wet well when the well deck is flooded for operations,

The structure on the latest naval amphibious ships does not precisely fit the traditional meaning of a weather, or open deck, that is lower than adjacent decks, surrounded by bulkheads and lacking proper drainage would form a catchment for water; however the structure has its origins in such an exaggerated deep deck on World War II era tank landing craft (TLC) the British forces were considering.

In July 1941 Major R. E. Holloway, Royal Engineers, forwarded a design from a 1924 patent by Otto Popper of the Danube International Commission concerning a barge transporter for Danube barges. The application of that idea to TLCs evolved into the British "Tank Landing Craft carrier" and that would become the Dock Landing Ship (LSD) that had an open, very deep and special purpose well deck open to the elements and thus technically a "well deck" in the traditional definition.

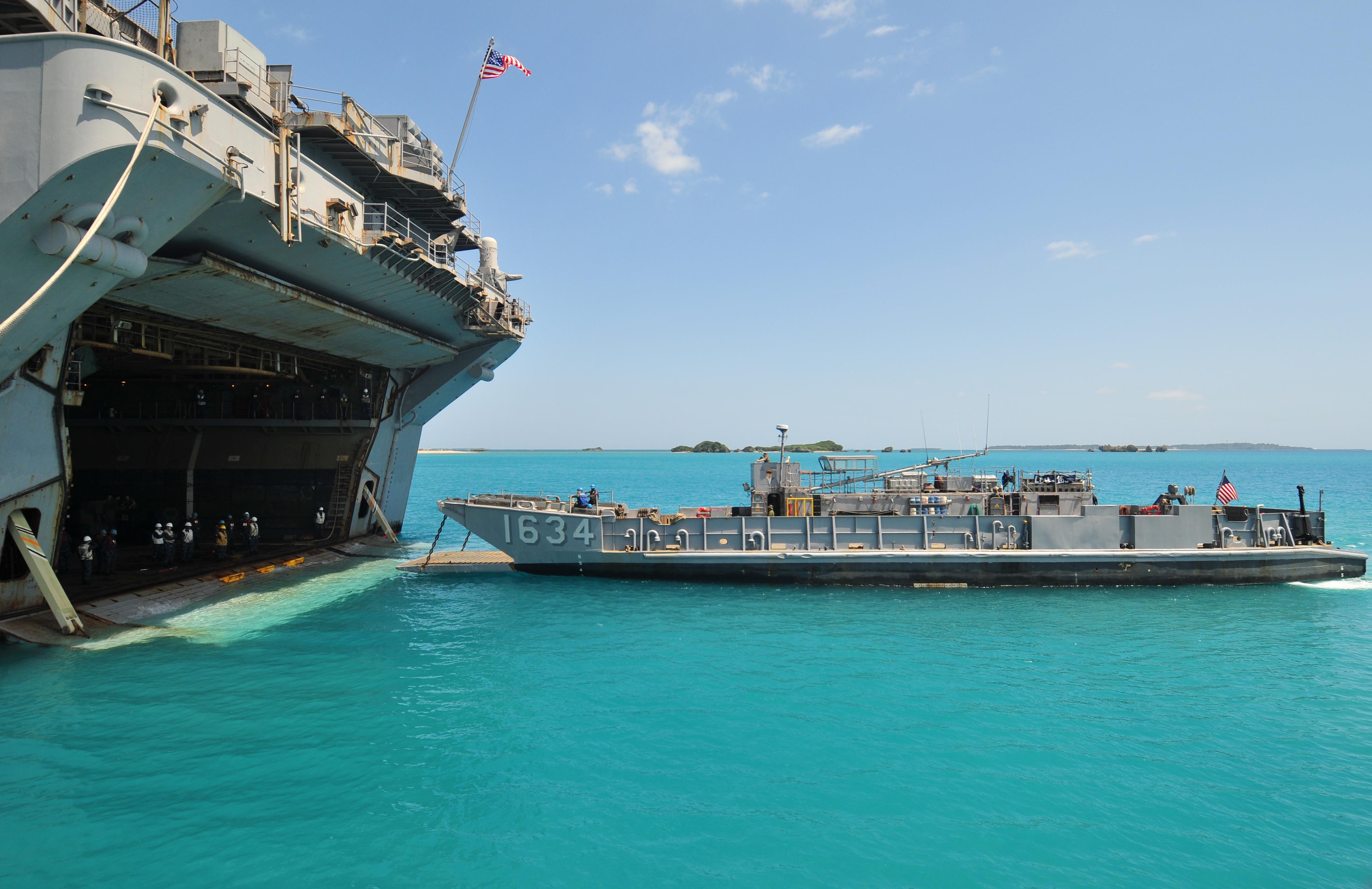
An LCU approaches the well deck of USS Essex.

The structure underwent an evolutionary change to become an enclosed structure, essentially a floodable compartment, for docking amphibious vehicles that in most modern versions has lost its weather deck character even as the more modern commercial ship designs have abandoned the traditional well deck structures that are not typically features of today's bulk cargo ships, container ships or passenger ships.

=== Commercial application ===
Some commercial vessels have similar structures for purposes similar to the military versions. The German Baco Liner ships use bow doors. Previous barge carriers were of similar design to the military ships with a large stern well deck. The increased use of containers and container port facilities has decreased the use of this type of commercial vessel with their main use serving regions with less well developed ports.
