= Enoki-class destroyer =

Imperial Japanese Navy destroyer class

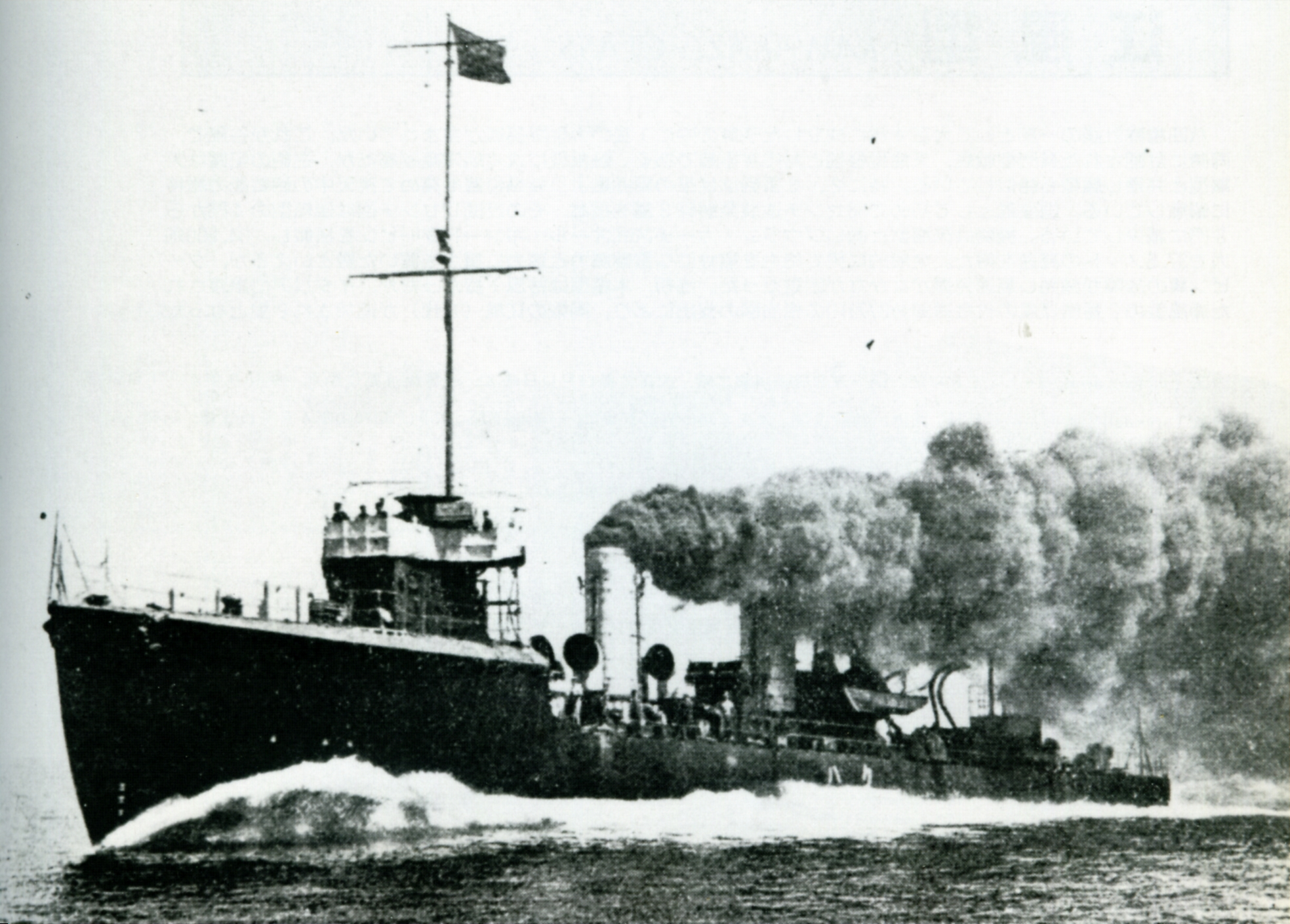
- Kuwa during speed trials off Hiroshima, 1918. Note the vast amount of smoke from coal-fired boilers

Class overview
- Name: Enoki class
- Builders: Kure Naval Arsenal (2); Sasebo Naval Arsenal (2); Maizuru Naval Arsenal (1); Yokosuka Naval Arsenal (1)
- Operators: Imperial Japanese Navy
- Preceded by: Momo class
- Succeeded by: Kawakaze class
- In commission: 1918–1936
- Completed: 6
- Retired: 6

General characteristics
- Type: Destroyer
- Displacement: 850 long tons (864 t) normal, 1,100 long tons (1,118 t) full load
- Length: 83.8 m (275 ft) pp, 85.8 m (281 ft) overall
- Beam: 7.7 m (25 ft)
- Draught: 2.3 m (7.5 ft)
- Propulsion: 2-shaft steam turbine, 4 boilers 16,700 ihp (12,500 kW)
- Speed: 31.5 knots (58.3 km/h)
- Range: 2,400 nmi (4,400 km; 2,800 mi) at 15 knots (28 km/h; 17 mph)
- Complement: 110
- Armament: 3 × QF 4.7 inch Gun Mk I – IV; 2 × 6.5mm machine guns; 6 × 53cm torpedoes

The Enoki-class destroyers (榎型駆逐艦, Enokigata kuchikukan) were a class of six destroyers of the Imperial Japanese Navy. As with the previous Momo class, all were named after trees. As Enoki and Nara were both commissioned on the same day, the class is also referred to as the Nara-class destroyers (楢型駆逐艦, Naragata kuchikukan).

== Background ==
With most of Japan's destroyers deployed to the Mediterranean Sea as part of Japan's contribution to the war effort against Imperial Germany under the Anglo-Japanese Alliance, the Imperial Japanese Navy approached the Diet of Japan for an emergency procurement budget, similar to that awarded during the Russo-Japanese War for the production of the Kamikaze-class destroyers. The funding was awarded from the fiscal 1917 budget, but mindful of the fact that the Kamikaze-class destroyers had not actually been completed until after the end of the previous war, the government stipulated that the emergency budget be used up within a six-month period.

The order for six vessels was split between the four major naval shipyards: one to Yokosuka Naval Arsenal, two to Kure Naval Arsenal, two to Sasebo Naval Arsenal and one to Maizuru Naval Arsenal.

== Design ==
With such a limited time frame to use its budget, the Japanese Navy could not afford the time to design a new ship. Therefore, the blueprints for the previous Momo-class destroyers were distributed to each shipyard, with the instructions that identical ships be produced, except with sturdier armor and bow construction. Experience with extended overseas deployment in World War I had taught the Japanese Navy that the construction of its destroyers needed to be reinforced to handle heavy seas. The result was a ship which looked physically almost exactly like the Momo class, but was roughly 15 tons heavier in displacement.

Internally, all six vessels used Brown-Curtis geared steam turbine engines, which could use either heavy fuel oil or coal for propulsion. Armament was identical to the Momo class, with three QF 4.7 inch Gun Mk I – IV guns, pedestal mounted along the centerline of the vessel, front, mid-ship and to the stern and two triple torpedo launchers.

== Operational history ==
The Enoki-class destroyers served in the very final stages of World War I, where they were deployed mostly in local waters near the Japanese home islands. Enoki and Nara were converted to minesweepers on 1 June 1930. The remaining four vessels were retired on 1 April 1934.

== List of Ships ==
Construction data
Kanji	Name	Builder	Laid down	Launched	Completed	Fate
榎	Enoki "Evergreen Shrub"	Maizuru Naval Arsenal, Japan	1 October 1917	5 March 1918	30 April 1918	Minesweeper W-10 on 1 June 1930; Demilitarized, 1 July 1936
槇	Maki "Chinese Black Pine"	Sasebo Naval Arsenal, Japan	16 October 1917	2 December 1917	7 April 1918	Retired, 1 April 1934
欅	Keyaki "Elm Tree"	Sasebo Naval Arsenal, Japan	16 October 1917	15 January 1918	20 April 1918	Retired, 1 April 1934
桑	Kuwa "Mulberry Tree"	Kure Naval Arsenal, Japan	5 November 1917	23 February 1918	31 March 1918	Retired, 1 April 1934
椿	Tsubaki "Camellia Tree"	Kure Naval Arsenal, Japan	5 November 1917	23 February 1918	30 April 1918	Retired, 1 April 1935
楢	Nara "Oak Tinder"	Yokosuka Naval Arsenal, Japan	8 November 1917	28 March 1918	30 April 1918	Minesweeper W-9 on 1 June 1930; Demilitarized, 1 April 1936
