= Shiro Kawase =

Imperial Japanese Navy vice admiral (1889–1946)

- 河瀬 四郎
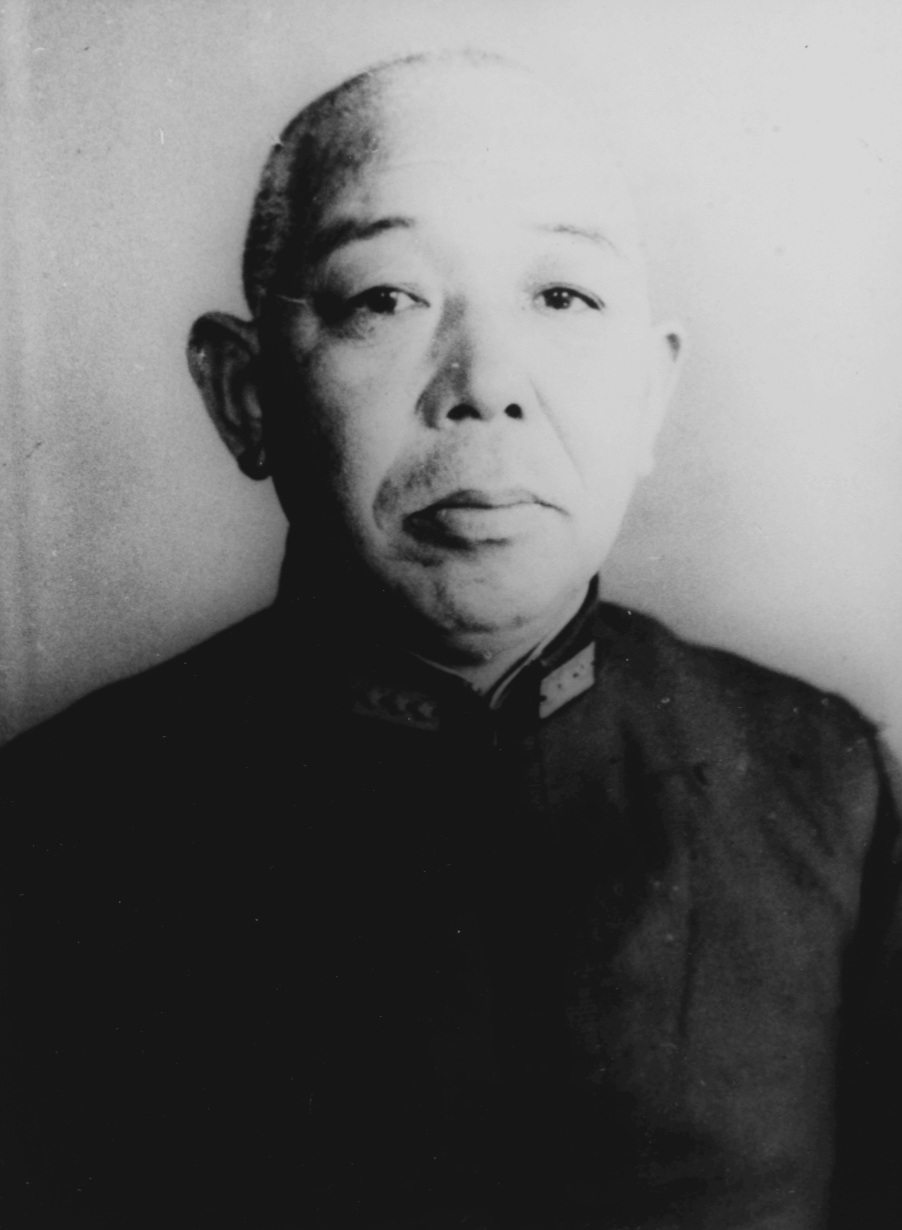
- Born: July 7, 1889; Okayama, Japan
- Died: 20 July 1946 (aged 57); Japan
- Education: Imperial Japanese Naval Academy; Gunnery School; Torpedo School; Naval War College
- Military career
- Allegiance: Empire of Japan
- Branch: Imperial Japanese Navy
- Service years: 1910–1945
- Rank: Vice admiral
- Units: Kasagi, Izumo, Iwate, Kikutsuki, Chikuma, Fusō, Hatsuharu, 2nd Naval District, Amatsukaze, 3rd Fleet, Yokosuka Guard Force, Imperial Japanese Navy General Staff, Kuwa, Combined Fleet, Naval Shipbuilding Command, Kirishima, 1st Fleet
- Commands: Hagi, Kuwa, Destroyer Division 3, Destroyer Division 6, Destroyer Squadron 5, Destroyer Squadron 1, Carrier Division 7, Carrier Division 11, Torpedo School, 3rd China Expeditionary Fleet, Ōminato Guard District, 5th Fleet, 2nd Southern Expeditionary Fleet
- Conflicts: World War I; World War II; Pacific War; Aleutians campaign; Battle of Attu

Shiro Kawase (河瀬 四郎, Kawase Shirō; 7 July 1889 – 20 July 1946) was a vice admiral in the Imperial Japanese Navy during World War II. He was a torpedo expert and his extensive experience as a commander of destroyers and destroyer formations made him more knowledgeable about the escort of convoys than most Japanese commanders of his time. He is best known for his command of the 5th Fleet during the latter stages of the Aleutians campaign in the spring and summer of 1943.

== Biography ==
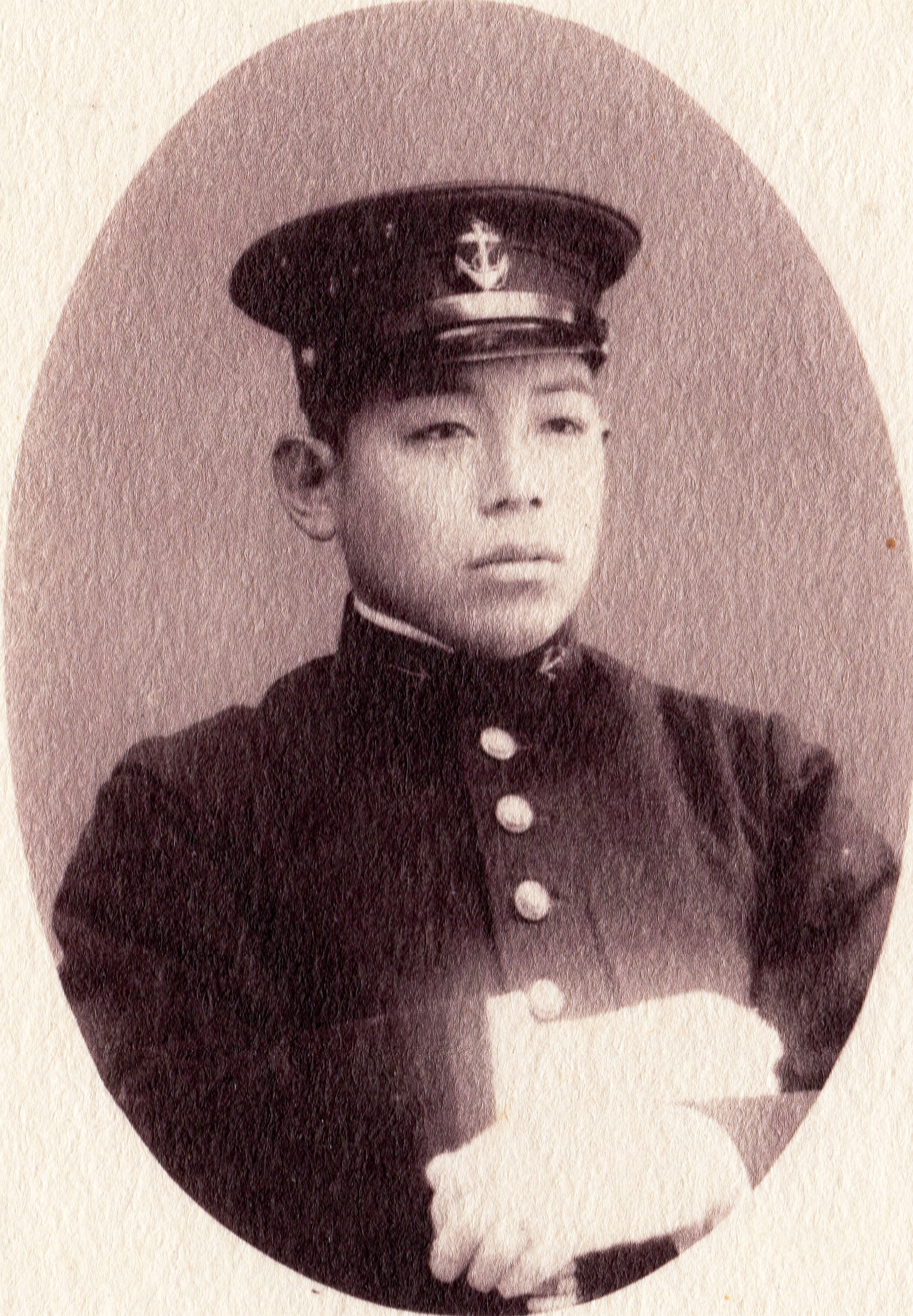
Kawase as a midshipman in 1910

Kawase was born in Okayama Prefecture, Japan, on 7 July 1889. He graduated from the Imperial Japanese Naval Academy on 18 July 1910, ranking 22nd in a class of 149 cadets.

=== Early career ===
As a midshipman, Kawase was assigned after graduation to the protected cruiser Kasagi, then transferred briefly to the armored cruiser Izumo on 23 March 1911 and then to the armored cruiser Iwate on 1 April 1911. Receiving his commission as an ensign on 1 December 1911, he attended the basic classes at the Gunnery School and Torpedo School in 1912 and 1913. Promoted to lieutenant, junior grade, on 1 December 1913, he served aboard the destroyer Kikutsuki before transferring to the protected cruiser Chikuma on 27 May 1914.

=== World War I ===
Kawase was aboard the Chikuma when Japan entered World War I on the side of the Allies on 23 August 1914. Chikuma was part of the Imperial Japanese Navy squadron which gave chase to the German East Asia Squadron in 1914, then joined the armored cruisers Ibuki and Nisshin in hunting for the Imperial German Navy light cruiser SMS Emden, which was raiding Allied shipping in the Indian Ocean. From December 1914 to February 1915, Chikuma and the protected cruiser Yahagi patrolled off the northern coast of Queensland, Australia.

Kawase transferred to the new battleship Fusō, still fitting out, on 30 June 1915, and was aboard her for her commissioning on 8 November 1915. She entered service with the 1st Fleet in December 1915 and patrolled off the coast of China without seeing combat. On 1 December 1916, Kawase was promoted to lieutenant and reported aboard the destroyer Hatsuharu.

On 2 July 1917, Kawase reported ashore for duty with the 2nd Naval District. Later in 1917, he took the B Class at the Naval War College, then located in Tokyo's Tsukiji district, and in 1918 he took the Advanced Class at the Torpedo School. World War I ended on 11 November 1918 before his next sea tour began.

=== Interwar, 1918–1941 ===
Kawase returned to sea duty on 1 December 1918, when he began an assignment aboard the destroyer Amatsukaze. He joined the staff of the 3rd Fleet on 26 June 1920, then returned for more duty aboard Amatsukaze on 1 October 1920. On 1 December 1920 he began the A Course at the Naval War College in Tokyo. After completing the class, he was promoted to lieutenant commander on 1 December 1922 and was assigned to the Yokosuka Guard Force.

Kawase's next tour was his first as a commanding officer, when he took command of the destroyer Hagi on 1 December 1924. He began duty with the Imperial Japanese Navy General Staff in Tokyo on 20 May 1925 before taking command of the destroyer Kuwa. On 1 December 1925 he joined the staff of the Combined Fleet, and on 1 December 1926 he became an instructor at the Torpedo School. He became a member of the staff of the Naval Shipbuilding Command on 20 August 1927, and on 1 December 1927 received a promotion to commander.

On 10 March 1929, Kawase began duty in the United Kingdom. Returning to Japan, he became executive officer of the battleship Kirishima on 15 January 1931. On 2 November 1931 he returned to destroyer duty as commanding officer of Destroyer Division 3, and he received a promotion to captain on 1 December 1931. He took command of Destroyer Division 6 on 15 November 1932.

On 1 November 1934, Kawase returned to the Naval Shipbuilding Command for another tour of duty. While there, he was promoted to rear admiral on 1 December 1937, with his first assignment as a flag officer being service as Chief, B2, Naval Shipbuilding Command. He returned to sea duty on 15 November 1938 as commanding officer of Destroyer Squadron 5, and he took command of Destroyer Squadron 1 on 25 November 1939. He joined the staff of the 1st Fleet on 15 October 1940, and then took command of aircraft carriers, first as commander of Carrier Division 7 on 15 November 1940 and then as commander of Carrier Division 11 on 10 April 1941. He became schoolmaster at the Torpedo School on 1 September 1941 and received a promotion to vice admiral on 15 October 1941.

=== World War II, 1941–1945 ===
==== 1941–1943 ====
Japan entered World War II on 7 December 1941 – 8 December 1941 across the International Date Line in Japan – with its attack on Pearl Harbor, Hawaii. Soon thereafter, Kawase took command of the 3rd China Expeditionary Fleet – responsible for operations off northern China, in the Bohai Gulf and off Qingdao – on 26 December 1941. He transferred to the Navy General Staff in Tokyo on 10 April 1942, then on 15 September 1942 became commander of the Ōminato Guard District, the major Imperial Japanese Navy base in northern Honshu, responsible for control of Tsugaru Strait and patrols along the coasts of Hokkaidō and Karafuto and in the Kurile Islands.

==== Aleutians campaign ====
Vice Admiral Boshirō Hosogaya, commander of the 5th Fleet and the Northern Area Force, put in an embarrassing performance in the Battle of the Komandorski Islands on 26 March 1943 while in command of a task force escorting a convoy bringing reinforcements to the Japanese garrison on Kiska in the Aleutian Islands, sending the convoy back to port and withdrawing in the face of a smaller United States Navy force. As a result, Hosogaya was relieved of command on 31 March 1943, and Kawase was placed in charge of the 5th Fleet and the Northern Area Force the following day with his headquarters at Paramushiro in the Kurile Islands.

===== Attu, May 1943 =====
In addition to the troops on Kiska, Japan had an Aleutian garrison on Attu; a U.S. Navy force of cruisers and destroyers bombarded Attu in late April 1943, but Kawase missed a chance to attack that force when a false report of an enemy ship off Shumushu in the Kurile Islands caused him instead to divert forces to deal with it, only to find that it was a neutral Soviet ship laying mines in Soviet waters off the Kamchatka Peninsula. By early May 1943, Japan had alerted the troops on Attu that an American invasion of the island was imminent. One of Kawase's first priorities as the new fleet commander was to send reinforcements to Attu to aid in defense of the island. However, heavy losses in the Guadalcanal campaign and the ongoing Solomon Islands campaign had forced Japan to divert forces to the defense of the Solomon Islands and New Guinea, and Kawase was forced to inform the island commander, Imperial Japanese Army colonel Yasuyo Yamasaki, that no reinforcements could arrive until late May, when increased fog in the Aleutians would help a reinforcement convoy avoid detection by American forces and by which time Japanese merchant ships earmarked for the reinforcement operation would have radar installed. Meanwhile, Kawase ordered Yamasaki to hold Attu with the forces he already had.

The Battle of Attu began on 11 May 1943, when the United States Army's 7th Infantry Division landed on the island. Kawase put to sea from Paramushiro in his flagship, the heavy cruiser Maya, accompanied by a destroyer to rendezvous with the seaplane tender Kimikawa Maru, which was part of a small convoy carrying floatplanes to Attu. In response to Kawase's urgent request for more warships with which to oppose the American landings, Combined Fleet commander-in-chief Admiral Mineichi Koga assigned a task force centered around a heavy cruiser and two light cruisers to the 5th Fleet, and it departed Paramushiro on 17 May to rendezvous with Kawase south of the Komandorski Islands. However, Kawase had received reports that the U.S. Navy task force of 40 ships included three battleships and an aircraft carrier, and – not knowing that the American ships were temporarily out of ammunition after providing gunfire support to American troops ashore – he ordered his outnumbered and outgunned task force to loiter 300 nautical miles (556 km; 345 mi) west of Attu, hoping for a break that would allow him to get the reinforcements through. He was still circling there on 20 May when Imperial General Headquarters ordered him to attack U.S. Navy forces off Attu; when he responded that his force did not stand a chance against the superior U.S. Navy force around the island, Imperial General Headquarters changed its orders the same day, directing him instead to use submarines to evacuate the Attu garrison. Accordingly, Kawase ordered his submarine force to move toward the island, and on 23 May informed Yamasaki that no reinforcement convoy would arrive and that his troops should prepare to evacuate by submarine.

Plagued by bad weather, Japanese aircraft made their only appearance at Attu on 23 May 1943 when 16 Imperial Japanese Navy Air Service Mitsubishi G4M (Allied reporting name "Betty") bombers made an unsuccessful torpedo attack against American ships offshore, losing nine of their number. On 28 May, Kawase informed Yamasaki that the 5th Fleet's submarine force had been recalled because of losses it had suffered to U.S. Navy destroyers, and Attu fell to the Americans on 30 May after the almost complete annihilation of the isolated Japanese garrison.

===== Kiska, July 1943 =====
The loss of Attu placed American forces in between Paramushiro and Kiska, allowing them to blockade Kiska. United States Army Air Forces (USAAF) aircraft soon began to operate from Attu; USAAF aircraft staging through Attu even made the first airstrike against Paramushiro on 18 July 1943, causing a startled Kawase to wheel his office chair to a window to see what was happening after a string of bombs detonated on a taxiway. The USAAF aircraft on Attu strengthened the blockade of Kiska and made it impossible for Kawase to send supplies or reinforcements to Kiska in surface ships; only his submarine force made resupply runs there, completing 20 such trips by 9 June 1943. Imperial General Headquarters wanted the Kiska garrison withdrawn so that its troops could be employed in the defense of the Kurile Islands, and ordered Kawase to use his submarines to evacuate them. The pace of American operations in the Aleutians suggested that the Allies would invade Kiska by late July 1943, and Kawase doubted that his submarine force – originally 13 submarines, but reduced to eight thanks to combat losses since the Battle of Attu began – could complete the 40 to 50 trips necessary to complete an evacuation by then. By 21 June, when Kawase ordered an end to the submarine evacuation operations, the 5th Fleet had lost three more submarines, and Japanese submarines had managed to evacuate only 820 troops, of whom 300 had died in the sinking of the submarines carrying them.

An American naval bombardment of Kiska on 6 July 1943, the first in nearly a year, convinced Kawase that an American invasion was imminent, and that his submarines could never get the garrison off the island in time; he wrote, "We cannot be...dependent on the submarines any longer...the evacuation has to be completed as soon as possible before mid-July." He decided to gamble on a bold move: Running the American blockade by steaming a surface force to Kiska in what the Japanese designated as Operation Ke-Go. Ordering a screen of submarines to deploy south of Amchitka to cover the surface ships, he placed the commander of Destroyer Squadron 1, Rear Admiral Masatomi Kimura, in command of an evacuation force made up of the light cruisers Tama, Abukuma, and Kiso, ten destroyers, an escort vessel, and an oiler. With Kawase aboard Tama as an observer, the force departed Paramushiro on 21 July 1943 bound for a point 500 nautical miles (926 km; 575 mi) south of Kiska, where it would refuel and await fog cover for its run to the island.

Receiving reports on 25 July that a U.S. Navy PBY Catalina flying boat had made radar contact on Japanese ships operating southwest of Attu, a force of U.S. Navy battleships, cruisers, and destroyers set off in search of it and on 26 July opened fire on phantom radar contacts ("pips") south of Amchitka in what became known as the "Battle of the Pips." The American ships then withdrew to refuel and replenish their ammunition. Kawase's and Kimura's force was 400 nautical miles (741 km; 460 mi) to the south at the time.

Five of the Japanese ships collided with one another on 26 July, and the escort vessel and a destroyer were so badly damaged that they could not make the final run in to Kiska Harbor, but Kawase and Kimura began a high-speed dash to Kiska that day with the remaining ships under cover of an advancing fog front. On 27 July, the Japanese ships steamed right through the area where the American force had "fought" the Battle of the Pips the day before; had the Americans preserved their ammunition supply and remained on station, they would have intercepted Kawase's and Kimura's ships. Giving up on awaiting the arrival of a storm before entering port, Kawase ordered the ships forward on 28 July to make the final run in to Kiska. While Tama with Kawase on board waited 20 nautical miles (37 km; 23 mi) offshore to cover the operation, Kimura and the remaining ships entered Kiska Harbor, took aboard all 5,183 Japanese troops in an hour, rendezvoused with Tama and Kawase, and made a high-speed dash back out of the area, arriving at Paramushiro on 31 July-1 August 1943.

Assisted by the weather and the American confusion that resulted in the Battle of the Pips, Kawase and Kimura completed Operation KE-GO without firing a shot – except when Abukuma fired a spread of four torpedoes at Little Kiska Island on 26 July in the mistaken belief that it was an enemy ship – or suffering any casualties and without being detected by Allied forces. In fact, American and Canadian forces earmarked for the invasion of Kiska were so unaware of the Japanese evacuation that they continued a heavy air and naval bombardment of the island and dropped propaganda leaflets there until their troops stormed ashore in Operation Cottage on 15 August 1943 expecting heavy combat with the Japanese – only to find the island uninhabited.

==== 1943–1945 ====
With the Aleutians campaign over, the Imperial Japanese Navy abolished the Northern Area Force on 4 August 1943, and replaced it the following day with a new Northeast Area Fleet combining the assets of the 5th Fleet and the 12th Air Fleet under the command of Vice Admiral Michitaro Tozuka. Kawase retained command of the naval surface component of Tozuka's fleet, reduced to one heavy cruiser, two light cruisers, two destroyer divisions, seven troopships, and a number of patrol vessels and other small craft.

Kawase began another tour of duty with the Navy General Staff in Tokyo on 15 February 1944, then moved briefly to the position of assistant chief of staff of the Southwest Area Fleet – which coordinated naval, air, and ground forces for the occupation and defense of the Philippine Islands, French Indochina, the Malay Peninsula, and the Netherlands East Indies – on 5 June 1944. He became the commander of the 2nd Southern Expeditionary Fleet, responsible for operations in the Japanese-occupied Netherlands East Indies, on 18 June 1944; during his time in command, U.S. Navy submarines attacked Japanese shipping in the area, and aircraft from British aircraft carriers struck targets on Sumatra in July, August, and September 1944 and January 1945. Kawase returned to the Navy General Staff on 29 January 1945.

=== Retirement and death ===
Kawase retired from the Navy on 20 March 1945, five months before World War II ended on 15 August 1945.

Kawase died in Japan on 20 July 1946 at the age of 57.
