= Japanese destroyer Hamakaze =

At least two warships of Japan have borne the name Hamakaze:

- Japanese destroyer Hamakaze (1916), an Imperial Japanese Navy Isokaze-class destroyer launched in 1916 and scrapped in 1935
- Japanese destroyer Hamakaze (1940), an Imperial Japanese Navy Kagerō-class destroyer launched in 1940 and sunk in 1945
