= Jinichi Kusaka =

Japanese admiral

- 草鹿 任一
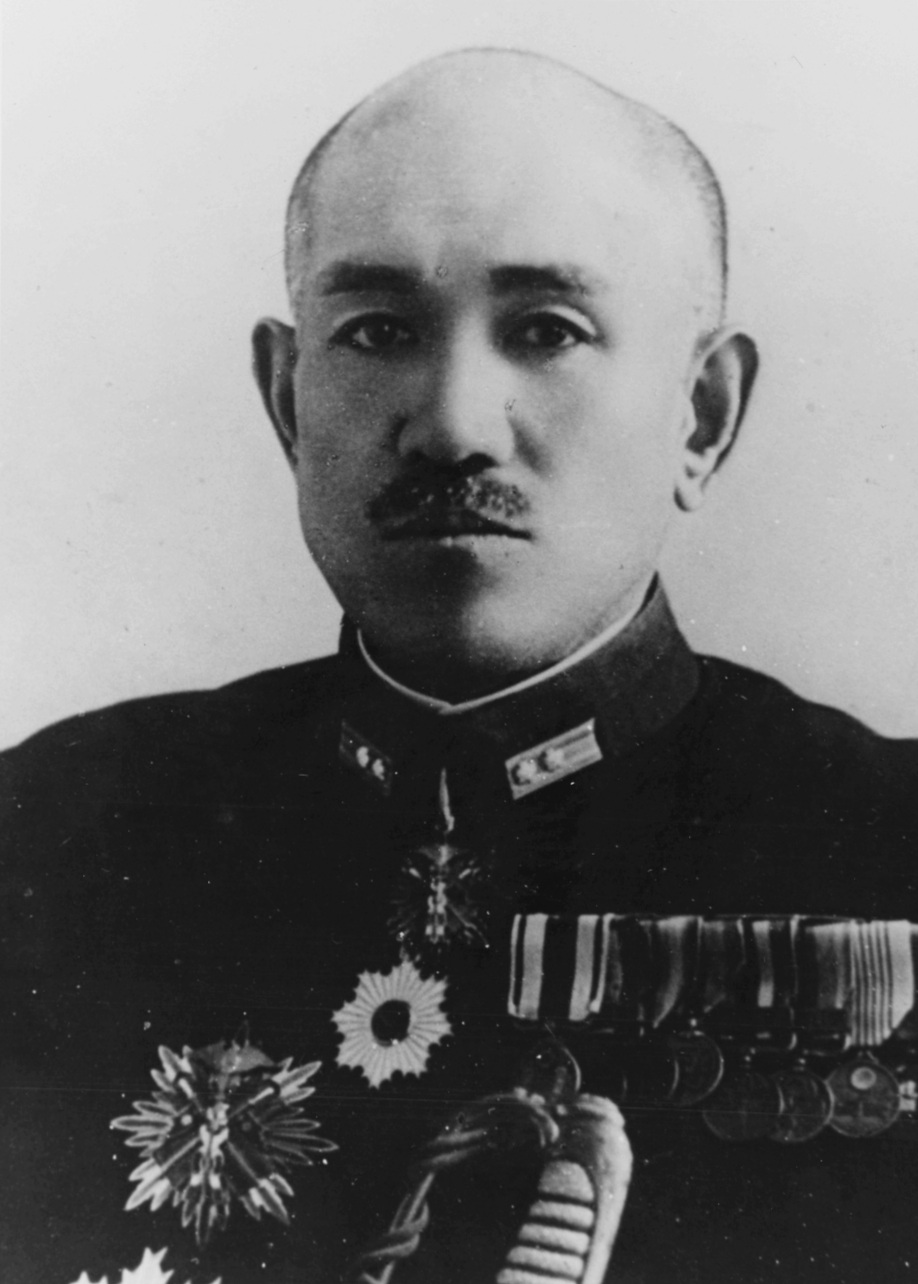
- Born: December 7, 1888; Ishikawa Prefecture, Japan
- Died: August 24, 1972 (aged 83)
- Military career
- Allegiance: Empire of Japan
- Branch: Imperial Japanese Navy
- Service years: 1909–1945
- Rank: Vice Admiral
- Commands: Kitakami, Fusō, Naval Gunnery School, 1st Carrier Division, Naval Education Bureau, Naval Academy, 11th Air Fleet, Southeast Area Fleet
- Conflicts: World War II; Pacific War; New Guinea campaign; Guadalcanal campaign; Solomon Islands campaign

Jinichi Kusaka (草鹿 任一, Kusaka Jin'ichi; 7 December 1888 – 24 August 1972) was an admiral in the Imperial Japanese Navy during World War II. Fellow Admiral Ryūnosuke Kusaka was his cousin.

== Biography ==
A native of Ishikawa Prefecture, Kusaka graduated from the 37th class of the Imperial Japanese Navy Academy, ranked 21st in a class of 179 cadets. He served as midshipman on the cruisers Soya and Chiyoda, and after being commissioned as ensign was assigned to the cruiser Tokiwa and battleship Aki. As a lieutenant during World War I, he served on the cruiser Asama, followed by the battleship Kashima and destroyer Hamakaze, but was not on any combat missions. After the end of the war, he attended the Naval Staff College, emerging in 1921 as a lieutenant commander. He was assigned to the battleship Hiei as Vice Chief Gunnery Officer, and to the battleships Yamashiro and Nagato as Chief Gunnery Officer.

After Kusaka's promotion to captain on 1 December 1930, he was sent overseas to the United States and Europe for one year. After his return, he received his first command, the cruiser Kitakami. He was subsequently captain of the battleship Fusō. On 1 December 1936, Kusaka was promoted to rear admiral, and became commandant of the Naval Gunnery School. On 15 November 1940, he was promoted to vice admiral.

At the beginning of the Pacific War, Kusaka commanded the Imperial Japanese Naval Academy. On 28 September 1942, he took command of the 11th Air Fleet located at the major Japanese base of Rabaul on New Britain in the South Pacific. Throughout the Guadalcanal campaign Kusaka's air units battled the Allied Cactus Air Force for control of the air around Guadalcanal, a battle that the Allied air forces eventually won. The 11th Air Fleet also supported Japanese military operations in the New Guinea Campaign.

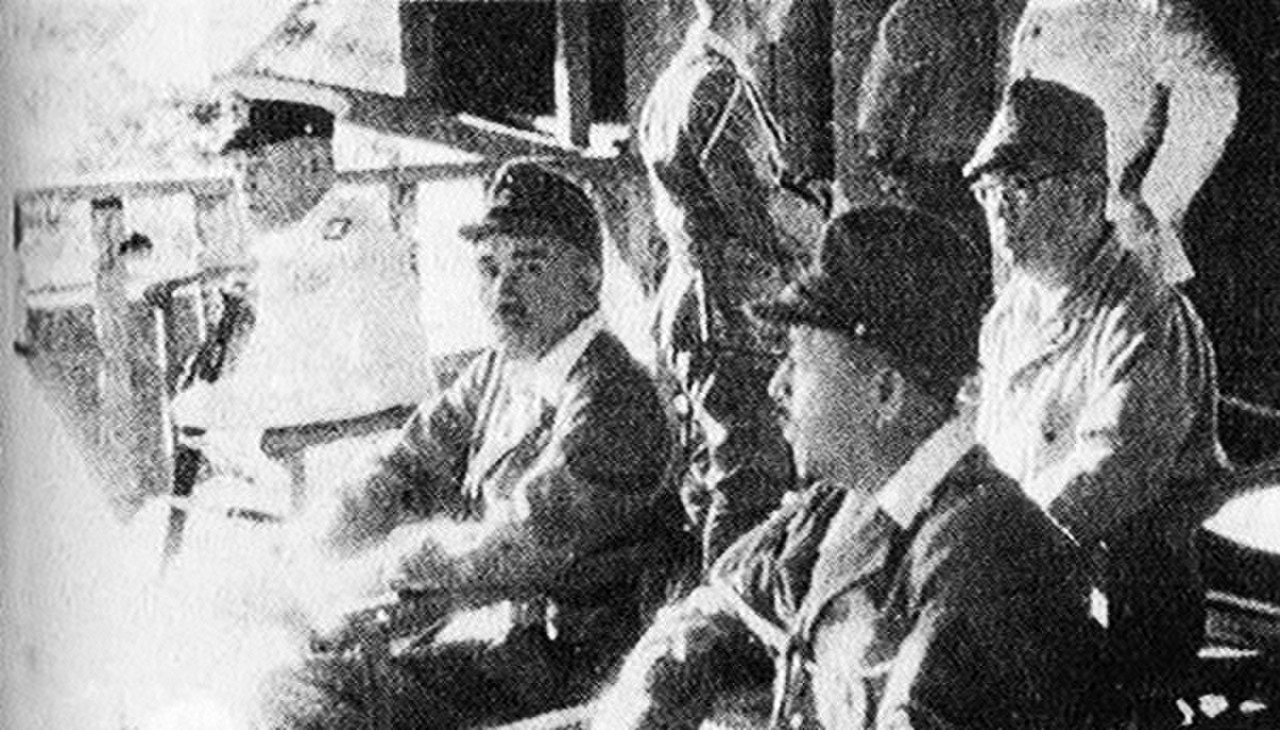
Kusaka (center) with Combined Fleet Commander Admiral Isoroku Yamamoto (left) at Rabaul in April 1943 during Operation I-Go shortly before Yamamoto's death.

On 24 December 1942, all naval forces in New Guinea and Solomon Islands area were combined into the newly designated Southeast Area Fleet with Kusaka in command. As commander, Kusaka directed the employment of naval ships and combat personnel involved in the fighting against Allied forces advancing up the Solomon Islands chain and New Guinea and New Britain towards Rabaul.

On 6 September 1945, Kusaka, acting as the senior officer for Japanese naval forces in the Rabaul area, along with General Hitoshi Imamura, the senior Imperial Japanese Army commander for the area, surrendered Rabaul to Allied forces.

Military offices
Preceded by None; Fleet created	Commander-in-chief of the Southeast Area Fleet; 24 December 1942 - 6 September 1945	Succeeded by None; Fleet dissolved
