= Amatsukaze =

Amatsukaze may refer to:

== Ships ==
- Japanese destroyer Amatsukaze (1916), an Imperial Japanese Navy Isokaze-class destroyer launched in 1916, completed in 1917, and scrapped in 1935
- Japanese destroyer Amatsukaze (1939), an Imperial Japanese Navy Kagerō-class destroyer launched in 1939 and commissioned in 1940 that served in World War II and was sunk in 1945
- JDS Amatsukaze (DDG-163), a Japan Maritime Self-Defense Force destroyer, the only one of her class, launched in 1963 and in commission from 1965 to 1995

== People ==
- Amatsukaze Masao (born 1937), Japanese sumo wrestler
