= Japanese destroyer Isokaze (1916) =

Isokaze-class destroyer

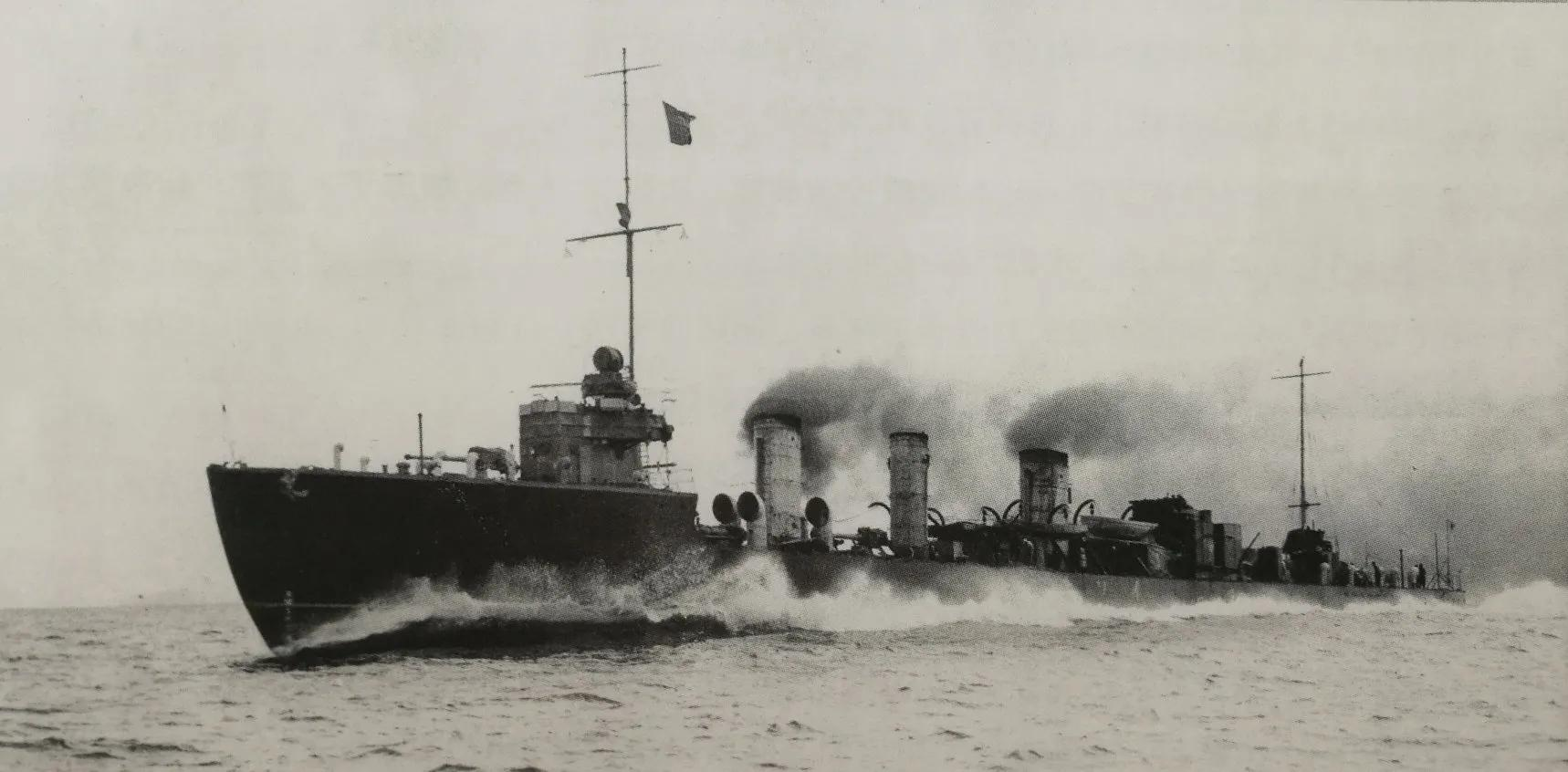

History

Empire of Japan
- Name: Isokaze
- Builder: Kure Naval Arsenal
- Laid down: 5 April 1916
- Launched: 5 October 1916
- Completed: 28 February 1917
- Fate: Retired 1 April 1935

General characteristics
- Type: Isokaze-class destroyer
- Displacement: 1,227 long tons (1,247 t) normal, 1,550 long tons (1,570 t) full load
- Length: 94.5 m (310 ft) pp, 96.9 m (318 ft) overall
- Beam: 8.5 m (28 ft)
- Draught: 2.8 m (9.2 ft)
- Propulsion: 3-shaft steam turbine, 5 heavy oil-fired boilers 27,000 ihp (20,000 kW)
- Speed: 34 knots (63 km/h)
- Range: 3,360 nautical miles (6,220 km) at 14 knots (26 km/h)
- Complement: 128
- Armament: 4 × QF 4.7 inch Gun Mk I - IV 5 ×6.5mm machine guns 6× 53cm torpedoes

Isokaze (磯風, Sea Breeze) was the name ship of her class of four destroyers, built for the Imperial Japanese Navy (IJN) during the late 1910s. The ship served in the very final stages of World War I. She was retired on 1 April 1935

== Design and description ==
The Isokaze-class destroyers were designed as part of the first phase of the Imperial Japanese Navy's Hachi-hachi Kantai, or "Eight-Eight Fleet" program. As the high speed battleships Yamashiro and Ise were commissioned in line with the program, escort vessels with equally high speed and blue ocean capabilities were required. The Isokaze was a slightly larger and updated version of the previous Umikaze class of destroyers. Externally, the design went to a three smokestack profile, with a curved, rather than straight bow.

Internally, the Isokaze used 3 Parsons steam turbine engines. Advances in turbine design and construction permitted more reliable operation than previously with the Umikaze. The rated power of 27,000 shp (20,000 kW) gave the vessels a high speed of 34 knots (63 km/h), and a range of 3,360 nautical miles (6,220 km) at 14 knots (26 km/h); however, the engines could not be run continuously at over 7,000 shp (5,200 kW), which still considerably limited performance.

Armament was increased over the previous classes of destroyers, with four QF 4.7 inch Gun Mk I - IV, pedestal-mounted along the centerline of the vessel, two in front of the smokestacks and two to the stern. The number of torpedoes was increased to three launchers, each with a pair of 533 mm torpedoes. Anti-aircraft protection was provided by five machine guns.

== Construction and career ==
The Isokaze was laid down at the Kure Naval Arsenal in Hiroshima, Japan on April 5, 1916, launched on October 5, 1916 and completed on February 28, 1917. Following its service in the final stages of World War I, the ship continued to serve within the IJN for 17 years along with its sister ships the Amatsukaze, Hamakaze, and Tokitsukaze. All four were retired on April 1, 1935. She was retired on 1 April 1935
