= Japanese destroyer Tokitsukaze (1916) =

Isokaze-class destroyer

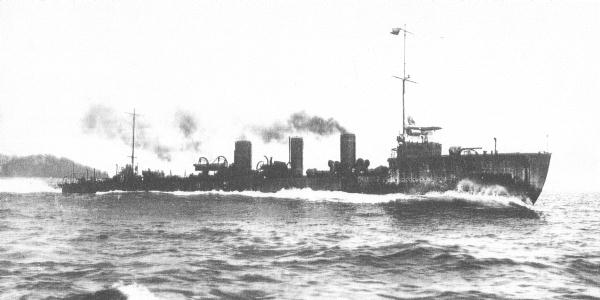
- Tokitsukaze on post-reconstruction sea trials on 1 January 1920.

History

Empire of Japan
- Name: Tokitsukaze
- Builder: Kawasaki Shipbuilding Corporation, Kobe
- Launched: 27 December 1916
- Completed: 31 May 1917
- Decommissioned: 1 April 1935
- Reclassified: As a training ship, 1940
- Fate: Sank in a storm, 1945

General characteristics
- Class & type: Isokaze-class destroyer
- Displacement: 1,227 long tons (1,247 t) (normal); 1,570 long tons (1,595 t) (deep load)
- Length: 310 ft (94.5 m) (pp); 326 ft (99.4 m) (o/a)
- Beam: 27 ft 11 in (8.5 m)
- Draft: 9 ft 3 in (2.8 m)
- Installed power: 5 × Kampon water-tube boilers; 27,000 shp (20,000 kW)
- Propulsion: 3 shafts; 3 × geared steam turbines
- Speed: 34 knots (63 km/h; 39 mph)
- Range: 4,000 nmi (7,400 km; 4,600 mi) at 15 knots (28 km/h; 17 mph)
- Complement: 128
- Armament: 4 × single 12 cm (4.7 in) guns; 3 × twin 450 mm (18 in) torpedo tubes

Tokitsukaze (時津風, Favorable Wind) was one of four Isokaze-class destroyers built for the Imperial Japanese Navy during World War I.

== Design and description ==
The Isokaze-class destroyers were enlarged and improved versions of the preceding Umikaze class. They displaced 1,227 long tons (1,247 t) at normal load and 1,570 long tons (1,600 t) at deep load. The ships had a length between perpendiculars of 310 feet (94.5 m) and an overall length of 326 feet (99.4 m), a beam of 27 feet 11 inches (8.5 m) and a draft of 11 feet 9 inches (3.6 m). Tokitsukaze was powered by three Brown-Curtis geared steam turbines, each driving one shaft using steam produced by five Kampon water-tube boilers. Two boilers burned a mixture of coal and fuel oil while the other three only used oil. The engines produced a total of 27,000 indicated horsepower (20,000 kW) that gave the ships a maximum speed of 34 knots (63 km/h; 39 mph). They carried a maximum of 147 long tons (149 t) of coal and 297 long tons (302 t) of oil which gave them a range of 4,000 nautical miles (7,400 km; 4,600 mi) at a speed of 15 knots (28 km/h; 17 mph). Their crew consisted of 92 officers and ratings.

The main armament of the Isokaze-class ships consisted of four quick-firing (QF) 12-centimeter (4.7 in) gun on single mounts. One gun was located on the bow, another between the forward pair of funnels, and the last two fore and aft of the rear superstructure. The destroyers' torpedo armament consisted of three twin rotating mounts for 450-millimeter (17.7 in) torpedoes. One mount was positioned between the forward funnel and the forecastle while the other pair were between the aft guns and the rear funnel.

== Construction and career ==
Tokitsukaze was built at Kawasaki's shipyard in Kobe. The ship was launched on 27 December 1916 and completed on 31 May 1917. She ran aground in heavy rain near Aoshima Island in Miyazaki Prefecture, Kyūshū, on 25 March 1918. The ship broke in half, but her equipment and weapons were salvaged. A replacement hull was begun at Maizuru Naval Arsenal on 2 December 1918, and she later reentered service with her machinery and weapons installed in the new hull. Decommissioned on 1 April 1935, she was hulked and renamed Haikan No. 20 as a training ship at the Imperial Japanese Navy Academy at Etajima in 1940. The ship survived World War II, but sank in a typhoon shortly after the war ended.

== Bibliography ==
- Friedman, Norman (1985). "Japan". In Gardiner, Robert & Gray, Randal (eds.). Conway's All the World's Fighting Ships 1906–1921. Annapolis: Naval Institute Press. ISBN 0-87021-907-3.
- Friedman, Norman (2011). Naval Weapons of World War One. Barnsley, South Yorkshire, UK: Seaforth. ISBN 978-1-84832-100-7.
- Jentschura, Hansgeorg; Jung, Dieter & Mickel, Peter (1977). Warships of the Imperial Japanese Navy, 1869–1945. Annapolis, Maryland: United States Naval Institute. ISBN 0-87021-893-X.
- Todaka, Kazushige; Fukui, Shizuo; Eldridge, Robert D. & Leonard, Graham B. (2020). Destroyers: Selected Photos from the Archives of the Kure Maritime Museum; the Best from the Collection of Shizuo Fukui's Photos of Japanese Warships. Japanese Naval Warship Photo Album. Annapolis, Maryland: Naval Institute Press. ISBN 978-1-59114-630-8.
- Watts, Anthony J. & Gordon, Brian G. (1971). The Imperial Japanese Navy. London: Macdonald. ISBN 0-35603-045-8.
