= Southeast Area Fleet =

- Active: 24 Dec 1942 – 6 Sep 1945
- Country: (Empire of Japan)
- Branch: Imperial Japanese Navy
- Part of: Combined Fleet
- Battle honours: Pacific Theatre of World War II

Commanders
- Notable commanders: Jinichi Kusaka

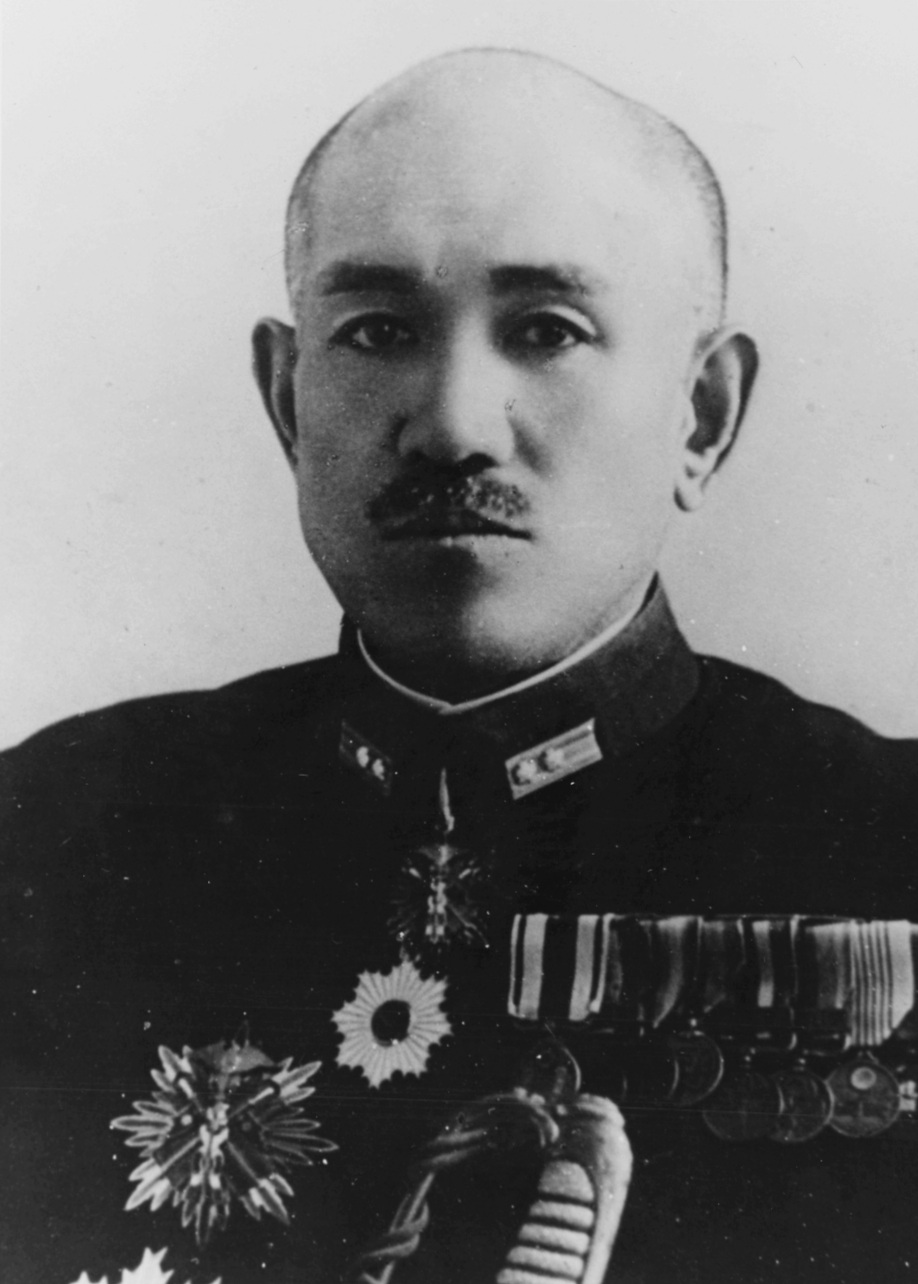
Vice Admiral Jinichi Kusaka, CIC of the Southeast Area Fleet

The Southeast Area Fleet (南東方面艦隊, Nantō Hōmen Kantai) was a fleet of the Imperial Japanese Navy established during World War II.

== History ==
The Southeast Area Fleet was an operational command of the Imperial Japanese Navy combining the remaining surface elements of the IJN 8th Fleet with the IJN 11th Air Fleet, the No.5 Special Base Unit. The Southeast Area Fleet was established on December 24, 1942, during the waning weeks of the Guadalcanal campaign and was headquartered in Rabaul, New Britain.

In February 1944, after heavy losses in the Solomon Islands campaign, most surviving Japanese surface and naval aircraft forces withdrew from Rabaul to Truk in the Caroline Islands. However, lacking transport, most of the headquarters staff of the Southeast Area Fleet was left abandoned on Rabaul, together with surviving elements of the Imperial Japanese Army IJA 8th Area Army, and was isolated until the end of the war.

== Commanders of the IJN Southeast Area Fleet ==
Commander in chief

| | Rank | Name | Date |
|---|---|---|---|
| 1 | Vice Admiral | Jinichi Kusaka | 24 Dec 1942 – 6 Sep 1945 |

Chief of staff

| | Rank | Name | Date |
|---|---|---|---|
| 1 | Vice-Admiral | Yoshimasa Nakahara | 24 Dec 1942 – 29 Nov 1943 |
| 2 | Vice-Admiral | Ryunosuke Kusaka | 29 Nov 1943 – 6 Apr 1944 |
| 3 | Rear-Admiral | Sadatoshi Tomioka | 6 Apr 1944 – 7 Nov 1944 |
| 4 | Vice-Admiral | Naosaburo Irifune | 7 Nov 1944 – 6 Sep 1945 |
