= Isokaze-class destroyer =

1916 class of Japanese destroyers

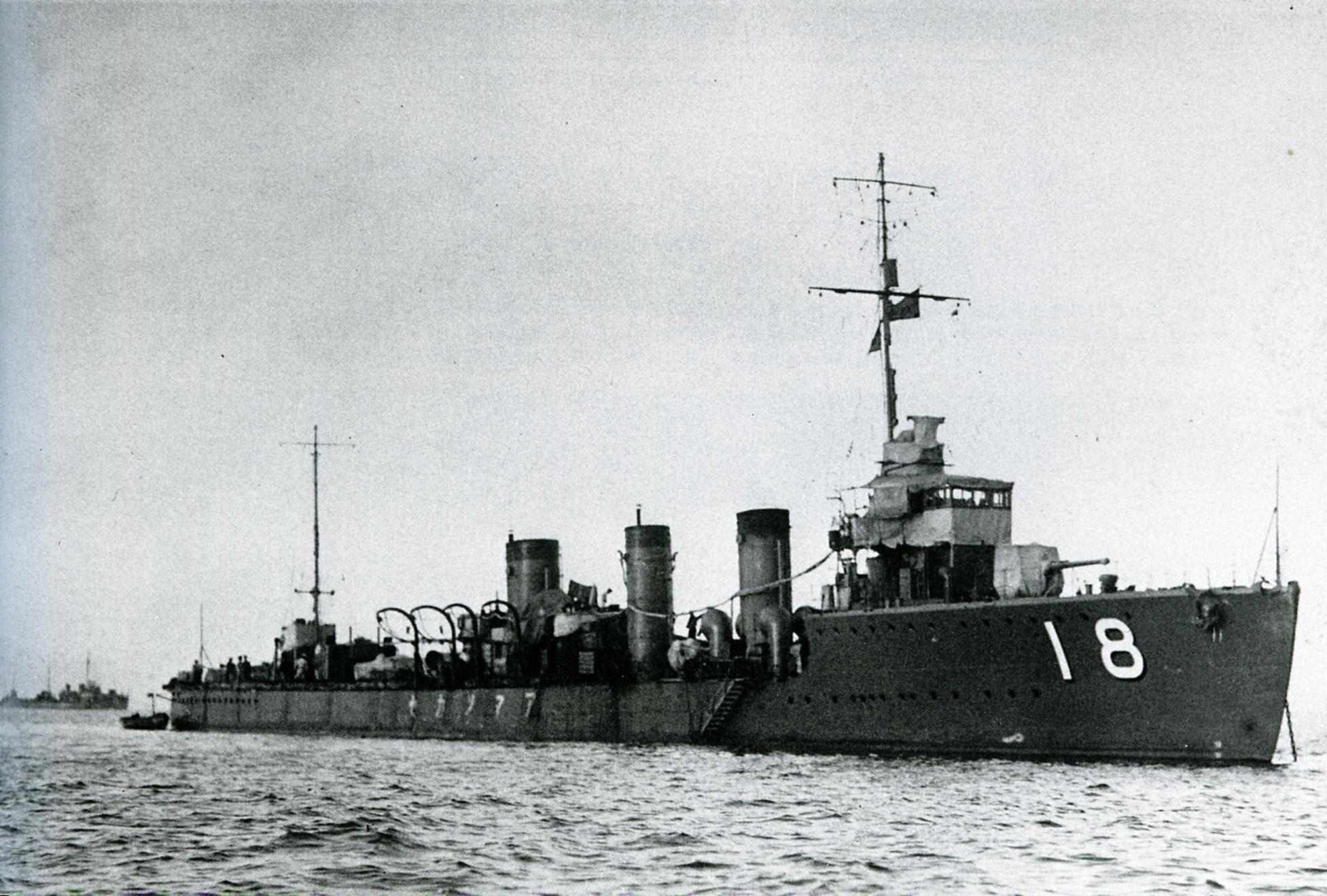
- Amatsukaze on patrol, Yangzi River, 1927

Class overview
- Name: Isokaze class
- Builders: Kure Naval Arsenal (2); Mitsubishi Shipbuilding & Eng.; Nagasaki Shipyard (1); Kawasaki Dockyard (1)
- Operators: Imperial Japanese Navy
- Preceded by: Kaba class
- Succeeded by: Momo class
- In commission: 1 April 1916 – 1 April 1935
- Completed: 4
- Retired: 4

General characteristics
- Type: Destroyer
- Displacement: 1,227 long tons (1,247 t) (normal); 1,570 long tons (1,595 t) (deep load)
- Length: 310 ft (94.5 m) (pp); 326 ft (99.4 m) (o/a)
- Beam: 27 ft 11 in (8.5 m)
- Draft: 9 ft 3 in (2.8 m)
- Installed power: 5 × Kampon water-tube boilers; 27,000 shp (20,000 kW)
- Propulsion: 3 shafts; 3 × geared steam turbines
- Speed: 34 knots (63 km/h; 39 mph)
- Range: 4,000 nmi (7,400 km; 4,600 mi) at 15 knots (28 km/h; 17 mph)
- Complement: 128
- Armament: 4 × single 12 cm (4.7 in) guns; 3 × twin 450 mm (18 in) torpedo tubes

The Isokaze-class destroyers (磯風型駆逐艦, Isokazegata kuchikukan) was a class of four destroyers built for the Imperial Japanese Navy during World War I.

== Background ==
The Isokaze-class destroyers were designed as part of the first phase of the Hachi-hachi Kantai program of the Imperial Japanese Navy. With the commissioning of the new high speed battleships Yamashiro and Ise, escort vessels with equally high speed and blue ocean capabilities were required.

Four vessels were built, with the order split between Kure Naval Arsenal, Kawasaki Shipyards in Kobe and Mitsubishi Shipyards in Nagasaki.

== Design ==
The Isokaze-class ships were a slightly larger and updated version of the previous Umikaze class. Externally, the design went to a three smokestack profile, with a curved, rather than straight bow.

Internally, the engines were replaced with heavy fuel oil-fired steam turbine engines. Two vessels (Amatsukaze and Tokitsukaze) used Brown-Curtis turbine engines, and the other two (Isokaze, Hamakaze) used Parsons turbine engines. Advances in turbine design and construction permitted more reliable operation than previously with the Umikaze. The rated power of 27,000 shp (20,000 kW) gave the vessels a high speed of 34 knots (63 km/h), and a range of 3,360 nautical miles (6,220 km) at 14 knots (26 km/h); however, the engines could not be run continuously at over 7,000 shp (5,200 kW), which still considerably limited performance.

Armament was increased over the previous classes, with four QF 4.7 inch Gun Mk I - IV, pedestal-mounted along the centerline of the vessel, two in front of the smokestacks and two to the stern. The number of torpedoes was increased to three launchers, each with a pair of 533 mm torpedoes. Anti-aircraft protection was provided by two machine guns.

== Operational history ==
The Isokaze-class destroyers were completed in time to serve in the very final stages of World War I. Tokitsukaze broke in two and sank off of Miyazaki Prefecture, Kyūshū in 1918. The wreck was raised and repaired at the Maizuru Naval Arsenal, and although re-commissioned as a first class destroyer, was used thereafter as a training vessel at the Imperial Japanese Navy Academy at Etajima.

All Isokaze-class ships were retired on 1 April 1935.

== Ships ==
Construction data
Kanji	Name	Translation	Builder	Laid down	Launched	Completed	Fate
磯風	Isokaze	Sea Breeze	Kure Naval Arsenal, Japan	5 April 1916	5 October 1916	28 February 1917	Retired, 1 April 1935
天津風	Amatsukaze	Heavenly Breeze	Kure Naval Arsenal, Japan	1 April 1916	5 October 1916	14 April 1917	Retired, 1 April 1935
浜風	Hamakaze	Beach Wind	Mitsubishi Heavy Industries, Nagasaki, Japan	1 April 1916	30 October 1916	28 March 1917	Retired, 1 April 1935
時津風	Tokitsukaze	Favorable Wind	Kawasaki Shipbuilding Corporation, Kobe, Japan	10 March 1916	27 December 1916	31 May 1917	Wrecked off Miyazaki coast, 30 March 1918, repaired 17 February 1920; retired, 1 April 1935
