= Japanese destroyer Hamakaze (1916) =

Isokaze-class destroyer

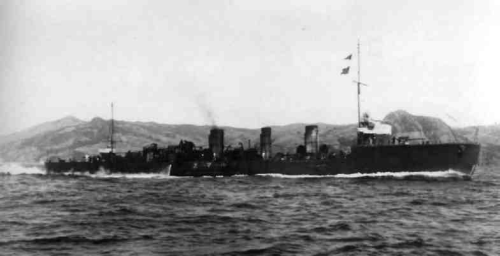
- Hamakaze on sea trials, March 21st 1917

History

Empire of Japan
- Name: Hamakaze
- Builder: Mitsubishi Heavy Industries
- Laid down: 1 April 1916
- Launched: 30 October 1916
- Completed: 28 March 1917
- Fate: Retired 1 April 1935

General characteristics
- Type: Isokaze-class destroyer
- Displacement: 1,227 long tons (1,247 t) normal, 1,550 long tons (1,570 t) full load
- Length: 94.5 m (310 ft) pp, 96.9 m (318 ft) overall
- Beam: 8.5 m (28 ft)
- Draught: 2.8 m (9.2 ft)
- Propulsion: 3-shaft steam turbine, 5 heavy oil-fired boilers 27,000 ihp (20,000 kW)
- Speed: 34 knots (63 km/h)
- Range: 3,360 nautical miles (6,220 km) at 14 knots (26 km/h)
- Complement: 128
- Armament: 4 × QF 4.7 inch Gun Mk I - IV 5 ×6.5mm machine guns 6× 53cm torpedoes

Hamakaze (浜風, Beach Wind) was one of four Isokaze-class destroyers, built for the Imperial Japanese Navy (IJN) during the late 1910s. The ship served in the very final stages of World War I. She was retired on 1 April 1935

== Design and description ==
The Isokaze-class destroyers were designed as part of the first phase of the Imperial Japanese Navy's Hachi-hachi Kantai, or "Eight-Eight Fleet" program. As the high speed battleships Yamashiro and Ise were commissioned in line with the program, escort vessels with equally high speed and blue ocean capabilities were required. The Hamakaze was a slightly larger and updated version of the previous Umikaze class of destroyers. Externally, the design went to a three smokestack profile, with a curved, rather than straight bow.

Internally, the Hamakaze used 3 Parsons steam turbine engines. Advances in turbine design and construction permitted more reliable operation than previously with the previous Umikaze class. The rated power of 27,000 shp (20,000 kW) gave the vessels a high speed of 34 knots (63 km/h), and a range of 3,360 nautical miles (6,220 km) at 14 knots (26 km/h); however, the engines could not be run continuously at over 7,000 shp (5,200 kW), which still considerably limited performance.

Armament was increased over the previous classes of destroyers, with four QF 4.7 inch Gun Mk I - IV, pedestal-mounted along the centerline of the vessel, two in front of the smokestacks and two to the stern. The number of torpedoes was increased to three launchers, each with a pair of 533 mm torpedoes. Anti-aircraft protection was provided by four machine guns.

== Construction and career ==
The Hamakaze was laid down at the Mitsubishi Heavy Industries Shipyards in Nagasaki, Japan on April 1, 1916, launched on October 30, 1916, and completed on March 28, 1917. Following its service in the final stages of World War I, the ship continued to serve within the IJN for 17 years along with its sister ships the Isokaze, Amatsuzake, and Tokitsukaze. all four were retired on April 1, 1935. She was retired on 1 April 1935
