= Japanese submarine chaser Shonan Maru No. 17 =

Japanese navy auxiliary vessel (WW2)

History

Imperial Japanese Navy
- Name: Shonan Maru No. 7
- Namesake: Singapore
- Owner: Nippon Suisan K.K.
- Builder: Osaka Tekkosho K.K., Innoshima
- Laid down: 14 January 1940
- Launched: 3 October 1940
- Completed: 20 November 1940
- Acquired: requisitioned by Imperial Japanese Navy, 26 September 1940
- Stricken: 3 May 1947
- Home port: Tokyo
- Identification: 47836
- Fate: unknown
- Notes: Call sign: JNUO

General characteristics
- Class & type: fishing ship
- Tonnage: 355 gross register tons
- Length: 40.6 m (133 ft 2 in) o/a
- Beam: 8.2 m (26 ft 11 in)
- Draught: 4.5 m (14 ft 9 in)
- Propulsion: Steam
- Armament: 2 x 25- millimeter single machine guns

Shonan Maru No. 17 (Japanese: 第十七昭南丸) was a Japanese fishing vessel that was requisitioned by the Imperial Japanese Navy during World War II and converted into an auxiliary subchaser.

== History ==
She was laid down on 14 January 1940 at the Innoshima, Hiroshima shipyard of Osaka Iron Works (大阪鉄工所, Ōsaka Tekkosho) for the benefit of Nippon Suisan K.K. She was launched on 3 October 1940, completed on 15 November 1940, and registered in Tokyo. She was the last of 13 Shonan Maru No. 1-class ships built 1938-1940 all sharing the same name (Shonan is the Japanese name for Singapore). The ships of the class in order of completion were: Shonan Maru No. 1 (第一昭南丸), Shonan Maru No. 2 (第二昭南丸), Shonan Maru No. 3 (第三昭南丸), Shonan Maru No. 5 (第五昭南丸), Shonan Maru No. 10 (第十昭南丸), Shonan Maru No. 11 (第十一昭南丸), Shonan Maru No. 6 (第六昭南丸), Shonan Maru No. 7 (第七昭南丸), Shonan Maru No. 8 (第八昭南丸), Shonan Maru No. 12 (第十二昭南丸), Shonan Maru No. 15 (第十五昭南丸), Shonan Maru No. 16 (第十六昭南丸), and Shonan Maru No. 17 (第十七昭南丸).

On 26 September 1940, she was requisitioned by the Imperial Japanese Navy. On 16 December 1940, she was designated as an auxiliary submarine chaser and her conversion was completed at the Hikoshima shipyard of Osaka Iron Works on 8 January 1941. She was assigned to the Sasebo Naval District, Third Fleet, as part of the 52nd Subchaser Division (along with netlayer Fukuei Maru No. 15 and subchaser Takunan Maru No. 5). The division was attached to the First Base Force based at Takao, Formosa. Her commanding officer was Reserve Lieutenant (J.G.) Yada Takeo (矢田武男).

=== Invasion of Batan Island ===
She was assigned to the Batan Island occupation force (8 December 1941) which began simultaneously with the Japanese attack on Pearl Harbor tasked with establishing an air base to support future operations against American forces on Luzon during the invasion of the Philippines.

On 7 December 1941, the 52nd Subchaser division along with the 53rd Subchaser Division (Korei Maru, Kyo Maru No. 2, Kyo Maru No. 11) and the 54th Subchaser Division (Nagara Maru, Shonan Maru No. 1, Shonan Maru No. 2) left Takao with Imperial Japanese Army transport Teiun Maru carrying part of the 24th Airfield Battalion. On 8 December 1941, she met with remainder of the occupation force off the coast of Batan Island consisting of transport Kumagawa Maru, destroyer Yamagumo, four Chidori-class torpedo boats (Chidori, Manazuru, Tomozuru, Hatsukari), two W-13-class minesweepers (W-13, W-14), two patrol boats (Patrol Boat No. 1, Patrol Boat No. 2), two Tsubame-class minelayers (Kamome, Tsubame), three converted gunboats (Aso Maru, Koso Maru, Nampo Maru), and seaplane tender, Sanuki Maru escorted by destroyer Tachikaze.

=== Invasion of Lamon Bay ===
She was attached to the Lamon Bay occupation force (21–23 December 1941) serving as an escort to 20 Imperial Japanese Army transports carrying 7,000 troops of the 14th Army; and Imperial Japanese Navy transports Hakusan Maru (carrying the 1st Quartermaster Ports and Docks Unit and 1st Naval Signal Unit), Kimishima Maru (carrying the 1st Naval Guard Unit), Senko Maru (carrying the 1st Naval Survey Unit), and Myoko Maru (carrying the 1st and 2nd Sasebo Special Naval Landing Forces). The convoy’s escort consists of Shonan Maru No. 17, light cruiser Nagara, heavy cruiser Ashigara, six destroyers (Tokitsukaze, Yukikaze, Kawakaze, Suzukaze, Umikaze, Yamakaze), minelayer Aotaka, two minesweepers (W-7, W-8), auxiliary gunboat/minelayer Ikumshima Maru, four auxiliary gunboats (Busho Maru, Keiko Maru, Kanko Maru, Myoken Maru), one auxiliary netlayer (Fukuei Maru No. 15), and one auxiliary subchaser (Takunan Maru No. 5). After the successful occupation, she returned to Kaohsiung on 6 January 1942 and then proceeded to Legazpi which had been seized by the Japanese on 12 January 1942. She departed on 16 January 1942 escorting a small convoy consisting of transport ships Kenyo Maru (乾洋丸), Tokyo Maru (東京丸), and Giyu Maru (義勇丸) arriving Davao on 18 January 1941. She then departed for Bangka Island, just east of Sumatra, arriving on 24 January 1942.

=== Later operations ===
On 10 March 1942, the 52nd Subchaser Division was assigned to the 2nd Southern Expeditionary Fleet.

On 1 March 1943, she was assigned to the Special Base Force 24 (二十四特別根據地隊), 2nd Southern Expeditionary Fleet, Southwest Area Fleet, Combined Fleet based at Ambon Island whose responsibility was the occupied Dutch East Indies. She spent most of her time patrolling the waters and conducting escort duty to Surabaya, East Java; the port of Dobo in the Aru Islands; Tual on the Kai Islands; and Kaimana, Netherlands New Guinea which had been overrun by the Japanese on 29/30 March 1942.

On 30 November 1943, the Special Base Force 24 was attached to the 4th Southern Expeditionary Fleet, Southwest Area Fleet, Combined Fleet based at Flores Island. The 4th Southern Expeditionary Fleet was carved out of the 2nd Southern Expeditionary Fleet; and tasked with patrolling the Sunda Islands and the seas to the west of New Guinea. She continued to operate out of Ambon.

=== Fate ===
She survived the war. Her last port of call was Singapore on 15 August 1945. She was struck from the Navy list on 3 May 1947.
