= Japanese netlayer Fukuei Maru No. 15 =

Japanese cargo ship

History

Empire of Japan
- Name: Fukuei Maru No. 15
- Builder: Mihara Zosen Tekkosho K.K.
- Laid down: 1939
- Launched: 9 August 1939
- Sponsored by: Mansen Unyu K.K.
- Completed: 8 December 1939
- Acquired: requisitioned by Imperial Japanese Navy, 10 May 1941
- Stricken: 25 August 1942
- Identification: 46382
- Fate: Sunk by aircraft, 10 August 1942
- Notes: Call sign: JYJN

General characteristics
- Type: Cargo ship
- Tonnage: 867 gross register tons
- Length: 54.9 m (180 ft 1 in) o/a
- Beam: 9.1 m (29 ft 10 in)
- Draught: 5.0 m (16 ft 5 in)
- Propulsion: Diesel

Fukuei Maru No. 15 (Japanese: 第十五福榮丸) was a Japanese cargo ship that was requisitioned by the Imperial Japanese Navy during World War II and converted into an auxiliary netlayer.

== History ==
She was laid down in 1939 at the Mihara Zosen Tekkosho K.K. shipyard for the benefit of Mansen Unyu K.K. She was launched on 9 August 1939, completed on 8 December 1939, and registered in Kobe. She worked as a cargo ship until 10 May 1941, when she was requisitioned by the Imperial Japanese Navy. She was designated as an auxiliary net-layer and her conversion was completed at the shipyard of Tochigi Shoji K.K. on 10 June 1941. She was assigned to the Sasebo Naval District, Third Fleet, as part of the 52nd Subchaser Division (along with subchasers Shonan Maru No. 17 and Takunan Maru No. 5). The division was attached to the First Base Force based at Takao, Formosa. Her commanding officer was Captain Tashiro Takayoshi.

=== Invasion of Batan Island ===
She was assigned to the Batan Island occupation force which began simultaneously with the Japanese attack on Pearl Harbor tasked with establishing an air base to support future operations against American forces on Luzon during the invasion of the Philippines. On 7 December 1941, the 52nd Subchaser division along with the 53rd Subchaser Division (Korei Maru, Kyo Maru No. 2, Kyo Maru No. 11) and the 54th Subchaser Division (Nagara Maru, Shonan Maru No. 1, Shonan Maru No. 2) left Takao with Imperial Japanese Army transport Teiun Maru carrying part of the 24th Airfield Battalion. On 8 December 1941, she met with remainder of the occupation force off the coast of Batan Island consisting of transport Kumagawa Maru, destroyer Yamagumo, four Chidori-class torpedo boats (Chidori, Manazuru, Tomozuru, Hatsukari), two W-13-class minesweepers (W-13, W-14), two patrol boats (Patrol Boat No. 1, Patrol Boat No. 2), two Tsubame-class minelayers (Kamome, Tsubame), three converted gunboats (Aso Maru, Koso Maru, Nampo Maru), and seaplane tender, Sanuki Maru escorted by destroyer Tachikaze.

=== Invasion of Lamon Bay ===
She was attached to the Lamon Bay occupation force serving as an escort to 20 Imperial Japanese Army transports carrying 7,000 troops of the 14th Army; and Imperial Japanese Navy transports Hakusan Maru (carrying the 1st Quartermaster Ports and Docks Unit and 1st Naval Signal Unit), Kimishima Maru (carrying the 1st Naval Guard Unit), Senko Maru (carrying the 1st Naval Survey Unit), and Myoko Maru (carrying the 1st and 2nd Sasebo Special Naval Landing Forces). The convoy’s escort consists of Fukuei Maru No. 15, light cruiser Nagara, heavy cruiser Ashigara, six destroyers (Tokitsukaze, Yukikaze, Kawakaze, Suzukaze, Umikaze, Yamakaze), minelayer Aotaka, two minesweepers (W-7, W-8), auxiliary gunboat/minelayer Ikumshima Maru, four auxiliary gunboats (Busho Maru, Keiko Maru, Kanko Maru, Myoken Maru), and two auxiliary subchasers (Shonan Maru No. 17 and Takunan Maru No. 5).

=== Demise ===
On 10 August 1942, while conducting anti-submarine sweeps along the coast of Timor, she was attacked by Lockheed Hudson bombers from the Royal Australian Air Force No. 13 Squadron and sunk off Beco city. On 25 August 1942, she was struck from the Navy List.
