= Japanese subchaser Kyo Maru No. 11 =

History

Empire of Japan
- Name: Kyo Maru No. 11
- Builder: Tsurumi Steelmaking & Shipbuilding Co., Ltd., Yokohama
- Laid down: 4 June 1938
- Launched: 12 August 1938
- Sponsored by: Kyokuyo Hogei Co., Ltd.
- Completed: September 1938
- Home port: Kobe
- Identification: 45199
- Notes: Call sign: JUAM

History

Imperial Japanese Navy
- Acquired: requisitioned by Imperial Japanese Navy, 20 September 1940
- Stricken: 1 April 1942
- Fate: Sunk after air attack, 2 March 1942

General characteristics
- Tonnage: 385 GRT • 140 NRT
- Length: 48.3 m (158 ft 6 in) o/a
- Beam: 8.0 m (26 ft 3 in)
- Draught: 4.5 m (14 ft 9 in)
- Installed power: Single steam turbine 700 SHP
- Armament: 1x Yamanouchi No. 1 6cm (60mm) gun 1 × Type 81 Depth Charge Thrower; 12 to 24 × Depth Charges; 1 × Suspended Hydrophone; 1 × Portable Active Sonar

Kyo Maru No. 11 (Japanese: 第十一京丸) was a steel-hulled auxiliary subchaser of the Imperial Japanese Navy during World War II.

== History ==
She was laid down on 4 June 1938 at the Yokohama shipyard of Tsurumi Steelmaking & Shipbuilding (formerly Asano Shipbuilding (jp:浅野造船所) and in 1940 merged with Nippon Steel) for the whaling company Kyokuyo Hogei Co., Ltd. (jp:極洋捕鯨株式會社). She was launched on On 12 August 1938 and completed on 3 October 1938. She was officially registered and certified as a whaling ship on 3 October 1938 and soon after departed her homeport of Kobe to begin one of two journeys to Antarctica to harvest whales (November 1938 – March 1939 and October 1939 – April 1940) with her mother ship, the newly built Kyokuyo Maru via her homeport in Kobe.

She was requisitioned by the Imperial Japanese Navy on 20 September 1940 and enrolled as a subchaser in the Maizuru Naval District. On 16 November 1940 fitting out work commenced at the shipyard of Namura Shipbuilding Co., Ltd. and was completed on 14 January 1941 at the Maizuru Naval Arsenal. On 15 January 1941, she was assigned to the 53rd Subchaser Division, Third Fleet under Navy Reserve Lieutenant Kawakami Isamu along with Kyo Maru No. 2 and Korei Maru. On 15 January 1941, the Division was attached to the Second Base Force based at Takao, Formosa.

She was assigned to the Batan Island occupation force which began simultaneously with the Japanese attack on Pearl Harbor tasked with establishing an air base to support future operations against American forces on Luzon during the invasion of the Philippines. On 7 December 1941, the 53rd Subchaser Division along with the 52nd Subchaser Division (Shonan Maru No. 17, Takunan Maru No. 5, Fukuei Maru No. 15) and the 54th Subchaser Division (Shonan Maru No. 1, Shonan Maru No. 2, Nagara Maru) left Takao with Imperial Japanese Army transport Teiun Maru carrying part of the 24th Airfield Battalion. On 8 December 1941, she met with remainder of the occupation force off the coast of Batan Island consisting of transport Kumagawa Maru, destroyer Yamagumo, four Chidori-class torpedo boats (Chidori, Manazuru, Tomozuru, Hatsukari), two W-13-class minesweepers (W-13, W-14), two patrol boats (Patrol Boat No. 1, Patrol Boat No. 2), two Tsubame-class minelayers (Kamome, Tsubame), three converted gunboats (Aso Maru, Koso Maru, Nampo Maru), and the seaplane tender, Sanuki Maru escorted by the destroyer Tachikaze.

On 3 January 1942, the 53rd Subchaser Division was assigned to Vice Admiral Kobayashi Tetsuri's newly created 31st Special Base Force, Third Southern Expeditionary Fleet, Southwest Area Fleet, operating in the Northern Philippines and assigned responsibility for commerce escort protection. She conducted various escort duties between the Lingayen Gulf and Takao as well as immediate protection for the Western Java invasion force which was mustering in the Lingayen Gulf.

On 2 March 1942, while escorting the Tamishima Maru and three other vessels form Cavite to Olongapo, she was attacked and sunk 8.6 km southwest of Grande Island by U.S. Army Air Forces Curtiss P-40 Warhawks during the Battle of Bataan. On 1 April 1942, she was struck from the Navy List.
