= Japanese netlayer Korei Maru (1939) =

History

Empire of Japan
- Name: Korei Maru
- Builder: Sanoyasu Senkyo K.K., Osaka
- Laid down: 19 March 1939
- Launched: 20 May 1939
- Sponsored by: Sanko Kisen K.K.
- Completed: 17 July 1939
- Acquired: requisitioned by Imperial Japanese Navy, 16 December 1941
- Stricken: 10 November 1944
- Home port: Amagasaki
- Identification: 45717
- Fate: Sunk by aircraft, 12 September 1944
- Notes: Call sign: JHNN

General characteristics
- Type: Cargo ship
- Tonnage: 540 gross register tons
- Length: 48.7 m (159 ft 9 in) o/a
- Beam: 8.3 m (27 ft 3 in)
- Draught: 4.1 m (13 ft 5 in)
- Propulsion: Diesel
- Sensors & processing systems: sonar
- Armament: 1 x 8 cm/40 3rd Year Type naval gun; 1 x 13.2 mm (0.52 in) AA gun; 1 x 7 mm machine gun; 1 x 60 cm searchlight; 24 depth charges; 4 x type 14 indicator nets

Korei Maru (Japanese: 興嶺丸) was a Japanese cargo ship that was requisitioned by the Imperial Japanese Navy during World War II and converted into an auxiliary netlayer.

== History ==
She was laid down on 19 March 1939 at the Osaka shipyard of Sanoyasu Senkyo K.K. for the benefit of Sanko Kisen K.K. She was launched on 20 May 1939, completed on 17 July 1939, and registered in Amagasaki. She worked as a cargo ship until 16 December 1941, when she was requisitioned by the Imperial Japanese Navy. She was designated as an auxiliary net-layer and her conversion was completed on 14 January 1942 at the Maizuru Naval District. She was assigned to the 53rd Subchaser Division (along with subchasers Kyo Maru No. 2 and Kyo Maru No. 11), Third Fleet. The division was attached to the Second Base Force based at Takao, Formosa. Her commanding officer was Reserve Lieutenant Hirano Susumu (平野進).

=== Invasion of Batan Island ===
She was assigned to the Batan Island occupation force which began simultaneously with the Japanese attack on Pearl Harbor tasked with establishing an air base to support future operations against American forces on Luzon during the invasion of the Philippines. On 7 December 1941, the 53rd Subchaser division along with the 52nd Subchaser Division (Shonan Maru No. 17, Takunan Maru No. 5, Fukuei Maru No. 15) and the 54th Subchaser Division (Nagara Maru, Shonan Maru No. 1, Shonan Maru No. 2) left Takao with Imperial Japanese Army transport Teiun Maru carrying part of the 24th Airfield Battalion. On 8 December 1941, she met with remainder of the occupation force off the coast of Batan Island consisting of transport Kumagawa Maru, destroyer Yamagumo, four Chidori-class torpedo boats (Chidori, Manazuru, Tomozuru, Hatsukari), two W-13-class minesweepers (W-13, W-14), two patrol boats (Patrol Boat No. 1, Patrol Boat No. 2), two Tsubame-class minelayers (Kamome, Tsubame), three converted gunboats (Aso Maru, Koso Maru, Nampo Maru), and seaplane tender, Sanuki Maru escorted by destroyer Tachikaze.

== Sinking ==
On 12 September 1944, she was sunk by aircraft from US Navy Task Force 38 off Cebu, Philippines at (10°20′N 124°00′E). On 10 November 1944, she was struck from the Navy List.
