= Japanese netlayer Nagara Maru =

Japanese cargo ship

History

Empire of Japan
- Name: Nagara Maru
- Builder: Goshi Kaisha Urabe Zosen Tekkosho
- Laid down: 25 April 1939
- Launched: 21 February 1940
- Sponsored by: Sankyo Kaiun K.K.
- Completed: 8 April 1940
- Acquired: requisitioned by Imperial Japanese Navy, 12 September 1941
- Stricken: 10 May 1945
- Home port: Osaka
- Identification: Call sign: JZVN; 46820
- Fate: Sunk, 5 March 1945

General characteristics
- Type: Cargo ship
- Tonnage: 855 GRT
- Length: 56.4 m (185 ft 0 in) o/a
- Beam: 9.4 m (30 ft 10 in)
- Draught: 5.2 m (17 ft 1 in)
- Propulsion: Diesel
- Sensors & processing systems: sonar
- Armament: 1 x 8 cm/40 3rd Year Type naval gun; 1 x 13.2 mm (0.52 in) AA gun; 1 x 7 mm machine gun; 1 x Type 96 light machine gun; 1 x 60 cm searchlight; 24 depth charges; 2 x type 14 indicator nets

Nagara Maru (Japanese: 長良丸) was a Japanese cargo ship that was requisitioned by the Imperial Japanese Navy during World War II and converted into an auxiliary netlayer.

== History ==
She was laid down 25 April 1939 at the Goshi Kaisha Urabe Zosen Tekkosho shipyard for the benefit of Sankyo Kaiun K.K. She was launched on 21 February 1940, completed on 8 April 1940, and registered in Osaka. She worked as a cargo ship until 12 September 1941, when she was requisitioned by the Imperial Japanese Navy. She was designated as an auxiliary netlayer and her conversion was started on 24 September 1941 at the shipyard of Niigata Iron Works Company Limited. Her sister ships, Uji Maru and Kumano Maru, were also requisitioned and converted into auxiliary netlayers. She was assigned to the Third Fleet, as part of the 54th Subchaser Division (along with subchasers Shonan Maru No. 1 and Shonan Maru No. 2). The division was attached to the 2nd Base Force based at Takao, Formosa. Her commanding officer was Lieutenant Sadazo Takezawa (竹澤定三).

=== Invasion of Batan Island ===
She was assigned to the Batan Island occupation force which began simultaneously with the Japanese attack on Pearl Harbor tasked with establishing an air base to support future operations against American forces on Luzon during the invasion of the Philippines. On 7 December 1941, the 54th Subchaser division along with the 52nd Subchaser Division (Shonan Maru No. 17, Takunan Maru No. 5, Fukuei Maru No. 15) and the 53rd Subchaser Division (Korei Maru, Kyo Maru No. 2, Kyo Maru No. 11) left Takao with Imperial Japanese Army transport Teiun Maru carrying part of the 24th Airfield Battalion. On 8 December 1941, she met with remainder of the occupation force off the coast of Batan Island consisting of transport Kumagawa Maru, destroyer Yamagumo, four Chidori-class torpedo boats (Chidori, Manazuru, Tomozuru, Hatsukari), two W-13-class minesweepers (W-13, W-14), two patrol boats (Patrol Boat No. 1, Patrol Boat No. 2), two Tsubame-class minelayers (Kamome, Tsubame), three converted gunboats (Aso Maru, Koso Maru, Nampo Maru), and the seaplane tender, Sanuki Maru escorted by the destroyer Tachikaze.

== Demise ==
After Batan, she primarily was involved in escort and anti-submarine duties around the islands of the Philippines and Indonesia. On 1 January 1945, Lieutenant Toru Kato (加藤徹) was named commander. On 5 March 1945, she was sunk by torpedoes from the submarine USS Sea Robin at (05°23′N 114°00′E) 145 km east-northeast of Borneo. On 10 May 1945, she was struck from the Navy List.
