= Japanese gunboat Aso Maru =

History

Empire of Japan
- Name: Aso Maru
- Builder: Mitsubishi Zosen K.K, Kobe
- Laid down: 20 November 1931
- Launched: 26 March 1932
- Sponsored by: Mitsui O.S.K. Lines
- Completed: 15 April 1932
- Acquired: requisitioned by Imperial Japanese Navy, 16 December 1940
- Home port: Osaka
- Identification: 37491
- Fate: Sunk by USS Gar, 9 May 1943
- Notes: Call sign: JUJH

General characteristics
- Type: Cargo ship
- Tonnage: 703 GRT
- Length: 51.8 m (169 ft 11 in) o/a
- Beam: 9.1 m (29 ft 10 in)
- Draught: 5.3 m (17 ft 5 in)
- Propulsion: Diesel
- Armament: 1 x 8 cm/40 3rd Year Type naval gun; 1 x Type 3 heavy machine gun; 12 Type 95 depth charges; 1 x 60 cm searchlight; minesweeping equipment

Aso Maru (Japanese: 阿蘇丸) was a Japanese cargo ship that was requisitioned by the Imperial Japanese Navy during World War II and converted into an auxiliary gunboat.

== History ==
She was laid down 20 November 1931 at the Kobe shipyard of Mitsubishi Zosen K.K. for the benefit of Mitsui O.S.K. Lines (MOL). She was launched on 26 March 1932, completed on 15 April 1932, and registered in Osaka. She worked as a cargo ship until 16 December 1940, when she was requisitioned by the Imperial Japanese Navy for service as an auxiliary gunboat. On 15 January 1941, her outfitting was completed at the Sakurajima facility of Osaka Iron Works and she was assigned to the Maizuru Naval District. Her two sister ships, Fuji Maru and Kiso Maru, were also requisitioned, the former as a subchaser and the latter, as a gunboat. On 10 April 1941, she was assigned to the 2nd Base Force, Third Fleet, as part of the 3rd Gunboat Division (along with gunboats Kiso Maru and Nampo Maru) based at Takao, Formosa.

=== Invasion of Batan Island ===
The 3rd Gunboat Division was assigned to the Batan Island occupation force which began simultaneously with the Japanese attack on Pearl Harbor tasked with establishing an air base to support future operations against American forces on Luzon during the invasion of the Philippines.

On 8 December 1941, the occupation force met off the coast of Batan Island consisting of the 3rd Gunboat Division along with the 52nd Subchaser Division (Shonan Maru No. 17, Takunan Maru No. 5, Fukuei Maru No. 15), the 53rd Subchaser division (Korei Maru, Kyo Maru No. 2, Kyo Maru No.11), the 54th Subchaser Division (Nagara Maru, Shonan Maru No. 1, Shonan Maru No. 2), Imperial Japanese Army transport Teiun Maru (carrying part of the 24th Airfield Battalion), Imperial Japanese Navy transport Kumagawa Maru (carrying 490 men of the Sasebo Special Naval Landing Forces), destroyer Yamagumo, four Chidori-class torpedo boats (Chidori, Manazuru, Tomozuru, Hatsukari), two W-13-class minesweepers (W-13, W-14), two patrol boats (Patrol Boat No. 1, Patrol Boat No. 2), two Tsubame-class minelayers (Kamome, Tsubame), and seaplane tender, Sanuki Maru escorted by destroyer Tachikaze.

== Sinking ==
On 9 May 1943, she was sunk by the US submarine USS Gar at (09°09′N 122°50′E) off the southwest coast of Negros Island.
