= Japanese invasion of Batan Island =

Part of the Philippines campaign of WW2

- Part of Philippines campaign (1941–1942), Pacific Theater
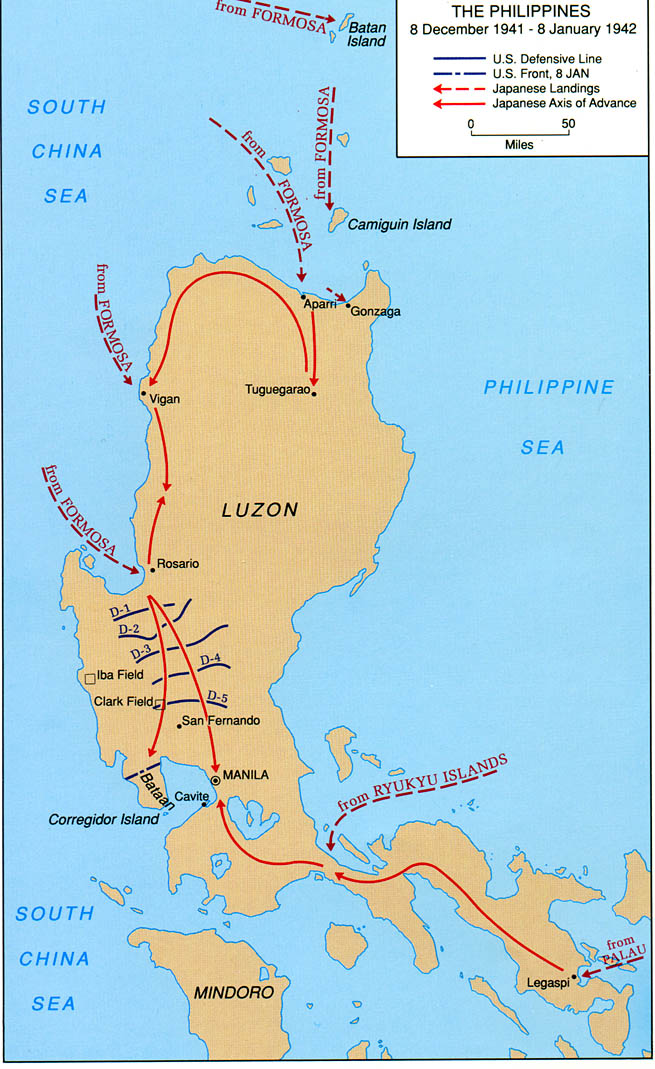
- A map of Luzon Island showing Japanese landings and advances from 8 December 1941 to 8 January 1942.
Date	8 December 1941
Location	Batan Island, Philippines
Result	Japanese victory

Belligerents
Empire of Japan	United States: Commonwealth of the Philippines

The Japanese invasion of Batan Island (Filipino: Paglusob ng mga Hapones sa Isla ng Batan) was the first step in their invasion of the Philippines, an American commonwealth territory. The US had acquired the former Spanish colony half a century earlier, when it defeated Spain in the Spanish-American War. The objective of the invasion was to seize local airstrips that could be used as forward operating bases for fighter aircraft to be utilized in further assaults in the Luzon mainland. The attack on Batan Island was the first of several other advance landings; with other landings taking place in Aparri, Vigan, Legaspi, Davao, and Jolo Islands.

== Background ==
The Japanese had been officially planning a strike on the American fleet at their main base at Pearl Harbor in the Territory of Hawaii since early 1941, but the idea had been informally speculated for many years.

Following the 1931 Japanese invasion of Manchuria, sparking the Second Sino-Japanese War, Japan exerted considerable efforts to try and isolate China, and to obtain sufficient natural resources to attain victory therein. The 1940 Japanese invasion of French Indochina was such an effort to control supplies. In response, the United States halted shipments of airplanes, parts, machine tools, and aviation gasoline to Japan.

In July 1941, the US placed an embargo against oil exports to Japan, leaving the Japanese with the option of either withdrawing from China or securing new sources of raw materials in the resource-rich, European-controlled colonies of Southeast Asia, such as present-day Malaysia (United Kingdom) and Indonesia (Netherlands), both oil producers.

Early in 1941, President Franklin D. Roosevelt ordered a military buildup in the Philippines in the hope of discouraging further Japanese aggression in the Far East. Because the Japanese high command was certain that any attack on the United Kingdom’s Southeast Asian colonies would bring the United States into war, they planned a devastating first strike against Pearl Harbor and the Philippines. Batan Island was the first part of the Japanese invasion of the Philippines and occurred simultaneously with the attack on Pearl Harbor. Its main purpose was to set up an air base for future operations against American forces on Luzon.

== Landing and aftermath ==
The invasion was mainly launched from the Japanese port of Takao in Taiwan on 8 December 1941. The Batan Island invasion force, under the overall command of Vice Admiral Sueto Hirose, consisted of a 490-man naval combat unit and an indeterminate number of air corps troops, on two transports (Teiun Maru, Kumagawa Maru) escorted by the destroyer Yamagumo, all four Chidori-class torpedo boats (Chidori, Manazuru, Tomozuru, Hatsukari), two W-13-class minesweepers (W-13, W-14), two patrol boats (Patrol Boat No. 1, Patrol Boat No. 2), nine converted sub-chasers (Shonan Maru No. 17, Takunan Maru No. 5, Fukuei Maru No. 15, Kyo Maru No. 2, Kyo Maru No. 11, Korei Maru, Shonan Maru No. 1, Shonan Maru No. 2, Nagara Maru), two Tsubame-class minelayers (Kamome, Tsubame), and three converted gunboats (Aso Maru, Koso Maru, Nampo Maru). The combat troops quickly secured the existing small airfield outside Basco without resistance, and the air corps troops began expansion work the following day to make it suitable for fighters and reconnaissance aircraft. The same day, the first planes of the Imperial Japanese Army Air Service 24th and IJA 50th Fighter Regiments landed at Basco.

However, over the next few days, the success of the Japanese bombing attack on Clark Field rendered the base at Basco redundant, and work was discontinued. On 10 December, the Batan Island invasion force was redeployed from Batan Island and invaded Camiguin Island in the Babuyan Islands to the south. The landing again proceeded without incident, and possession of the small airstrip on Camiguin gave the Japanese a forward airbase only 35 miles from Aparri. They also occupied nearby Calayan Island.

== Consequences ==
In retrospect, the advance landings in northern Luzon, including at Batan Island and Camiguin, accomplished little strategic or tactical value. The airfields seized were small, and with the rapid advance of the Japanese into central Luzon, were soon unnecessary for further operations. Vice Admiral Sueto Hirose, the orchestrator of the invasion, was later captured in Japanese-occupied West Sumatra and surrendered to Allied forces on 10 October 1945.
