= Kaimei Maru =

Hong Kong-built cargo steamship, sunk in WW2

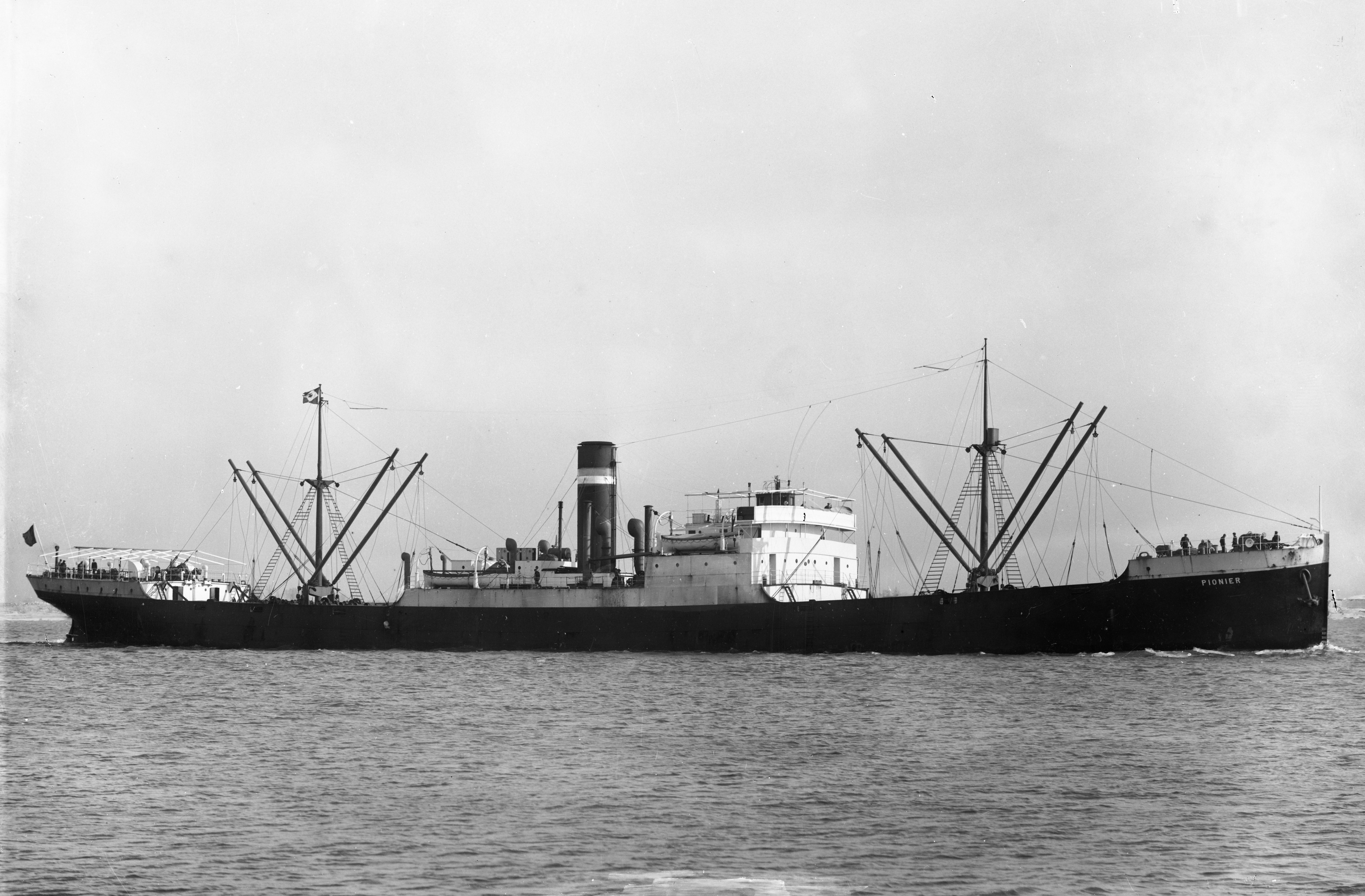
- The ship as Pionier, probably in the Scheldt

History
- Name: 1919: War Bomber; 1919: Pionier; 1939: Carmar; 1941: Kaimei Maru
- Owner: 1919: Shipping Controller; 1919: Lloyd Royal Belge; 1930: Cie Maritime Belge; 1939: Ag Mar Carmar, Ltda; 1941: Kaiyo Kisen KK; 1942: Tochigi Shoji KK
- Operator: 1930: Ag Mar Internationale; 1941: (Empire of Japan) Japanese Army
- Port of registry: 1919: (United Kingdom); 1919: (Belgium) Antwerp; 1939: Panama City; 1941: (Japan) Kobe
- Ordered: 1918
- Builder: HK & Whampoa Dock, Hong Kong
- Yard number: 563
- Launched: 1 August 1919
- Completed: October 1919
- Acquired: by Japanese Army, 13 Nov 1941
- Commissioned: into Japanese Army, 13 Nov 1941
- Identification: by 1922: code letters MPKE; 1934: call sign ORWA; 1939: call sign HPKA; 1941: call sign JSNO
- Fate: sunk by torpedo, 4 Sep 1942

General characteristics
- Class & type: War Standard Type B cargo ship
- Tonnage: 5,026 GRT, 3,560 NRT, 8,000 DWT
- Displacement: 5,226 tons
- Length: 400.2 ft (122.0 m)
- Beam: 52.2 ft (15.9 m)
- Draught: 25 ft 3 in (7.70 m)
- Depth: 28.5 ft (8.7 m)
- Decks: 2
- Installed power: 1 × triple-expansion engine; 517 NHP
- Propulsion: 1 × screw
- Speed: 10 1/2 knots (19 km/h)
- Sensors & processing systems: by 1930: wireless direction finding
- Notes: sister ship: War Trooper

Kaimei Maru was a cargo steamship. She was launched in Hong Kong in 1919 as War Bomber, a War Standard ship for the UK Shipping Controller. Soon after she was completed, Lloyd Royal Belge bought her, renamed her Pionier, and registered her in Belgium. In 1930, Compagnie Maritime Belge (CMB) took over Lloyd Royal Belge, and Pionier became part of CMB's enlarged fleet. In 1939, Agencia Marítima Carmar, Limitada bought Pionier, renamed her Carmar, and registered her in Panama.

In 1941, Kaiyo Kisen KK bought Carmar, renamed her Kaimei Maru, and registered her in Japan. That November, the Imperial Japanese Army requisitioned her as a troopship. That December, she took part in the Japanese invasion of the Philippines. In 1942, Tochigi Shoji KK acquired Kaimei Maru from Kaiyo Kisen KK. In September 1942, a United States Navy submarine sank Kaimei Maru off the coast of Japan, killing ten of the steamship's crew.

== War Bomber ==
War Bomber was a War Standard Type B cargo ship. Early in 1919, the UK Shipping Controller ordered her from Hong Kong and Whampoa Dock in Hong Kong, who built her as yard number 563. She was the largest ship that any Hong Kong shipyard had yet built. Her registered length was 400.2 ft (122.0 m), her beam was 52.2 ft (15.9 m), her depth was 28.5 ft (8.7 m), and her draught was 25 ft 3 in (7.70 m). Her tonnages were 5,026 GRT; 3,560 NRT; 8,000 DWT; and 5,226 tons displacement. She had a single screw, driven by a three-cylinder triple-expansion engine. It was rated at 517 NHP, and gave her a speed of 10 1/2 knots (19 km/h). She was a coal-burner.

She was launched on 1 August 1919, in the presence of Sir Paul Chater, the Director of the Hong Kong and Whampoa Dock Company; and Sir Claud Severn, the acting Governor of Hong Kong. In October 1919 she was completed, and the Hong Kong and Whampoa Dock Company launched her sister ship, War Trooper. War Bomber's UK ownership seems to have been very brief. Lloyd's Register records no UK official number, port of registration, or UK code letters for her.

== Pionier and Carmar ==
Soon after War Bomber was built, Lloyd Royal Belge bought her, renamed her Pionier, and registered her in Antwerp. By 1922 her code letters were MPKE. In 1930, Compagnie Maritime Belge took over Lloyd Royal, and Pionier became part of the merged fleet, managed by Agence Maritime Internationale. Also by 1930, the ship was equipped with wireless direction finding. By 1934, her wireless telegraph call sign was ORWA, and this had superseded her code letters.

In 1939, Agencia Marítima Carmar, Limitada bought Pionier, renamed her Carmar, and registered her under the Panamanian flag of convenience. Her wireless call sign was HPKA.

== Kaimei Maru ==
In 1941, Kaiyo Kisen KK bought Carmar, renamed her Kaimei Maru, and registered her in Kobe. Her wireless call sign was JSNO. On 13 November 1941, the Imperial Japanese Army requisitioned her as a troopship.

=== Invasion of the Philippines ===
Kaimei Maru was assigned to Army group 262, which supported the 14th Army troops, comprising elements of the 16th Division and 48th Division taking part in the invasion of the Philippines. Kaimei Maru was one of about 20 Japanese army transports carrying about 7,000 troops under the command of Count Hisaichi Terauchi, Lieutenant General Masaharu Homma and Major-General Susumu Morioka for the Japanese invasion of Lamon Bay, Luzon in December 1941. The invasion fleet was supported by elements of the Imperial Japanese Navy (IJN), including the IJN Southern Force under Vice Admiral Nobutake Kondō, IJN Philippines Invasion Group under Vice Admiral Ibō Takahashi and specialist forces of the Philippines Invasion Unit, 1st Base Force HQ under Rear Admiral Kyuji Kubo in command of the cruiser Nagara.

At 15:00 hrs on 17 December 1941, the Japanese invasion fleet left Koniya, Amami Oshima. It comprised the troopships Kaimei Maru, Bengal Maru, Dainichi Maru, Durban Maru, Kayo Maru, Kitano Maru, Kofuku Maru, Lisbon Maru, Nagato Maru, Nichiren Maru, Ryoka Maru, Ryuyo Maru, Shinsei Maru, Shinshu Maru, Taian Maru, Tatsuno Maru, Tōfuku Maru, Toyama Maru, Toyohashi Maru and Tamon Maru No. 5. The IJN escort fleet comprised the light cruiser Nagara, the heavy cruiser Ashigara, destroyers Tokitsukaze, Yukikaze, Kawakaze, Suzukaze, Umikaze, Yamakaze, minelayers Aotaka and Ikushima Maru, minesweepers No. W-7 and No. W-8, submarine chaser Shonan Maru No. 17 and Takunan Maru No. 5, auxiliary gunboats Busho Maru, Keiko Maru, Kanko Maru and Myoken Maru, and auxiliary netlayer Fukuei Maru No. 15. The fleet reached Lamon Bay at 02:00 hrs on 24 December 1941, and the landings faced relatively little resistance.

=== Convoys ===
On 26 January 1942, Kaimei Maru left Tsingtao (now Qingdao) in a southbound convoy with Durban Maru, Fuji Maru, Kayo Maru, Kofuku Maru, Lisbon Maru, Nichiren Maru, Shinsei Maru and Ume Maru. The destroyer Hasu, auxiliary gunboat Shinko Maru No. 1, and minelayer Sokuten escorted the convoy. It safely reached the Taichow Islands on 30 January 1942.

On 2 February 1942, Kaimei Maru left Makō (now Magong) in Taiwan in a convoy to Haiphong in Vichy-ruled Indochina with Durban Maru, Fuji Maru, Kayo Maru, Kofuku Maru, Lisbon Maru, Shinsei Maru and Ume Maru. The torpedo boat Kasasagi escorted the convoy. While the convoy was leaving the harbor, Lisbon Maru struck a Japanese defensive mine, killing 19 members of her crew. Lisbon Maru was towed to a nearby island and beached.

Later in 1942, Tochigi Shoji KK of Wakamatsu-ku bought Kamei Maru.

=== Loss ===
In early September 1942, Kaimei Maru left Nagoya for Karafuto Prefecture via Otaru to load coal, in convoy with the cargo ships Chita Maru and Tenryu Maru.

On 4 September, the US Navy submarine USS Guardfish, on her first patrol, attacked Kaimei Maru's convoy at Kuji Bay off the northeast coast of Honshu. At 16:40 hrs, Guardfish fired one torpedo, which hit one of Kaimei Maru's holds. She sank at 17:20 hrs at 40°14′N 141°51′E and ten members of her crew were killed. During the attack, Guardfish also sank Chita Maru and Tenryu Maru. When Kaimei Maru sank, Tochigi Shoji KK were still her owners.

== Bibliography ==
- Bertke, Donald A; Smith, Gordon; Kindell, Don (2014). World War II Sea War. Vol. 7. New York: Lulu.com. p. 90. ISBN 978-1937470111.
- Kimble, David L (1997). Chronology of U.S. Navy Submarine Operations in the Pacific, 1939-1942. New York: Merriam Press. ISBN 1576380238.
- Lloyd's Register of Shipping. Vol. II.–Steamers. London: Lloyd's Register of Shipping. 1919 – via Internet Archive.
- Lloyd's Register of Shipping. Vol. II.–Steamers and Motor Vessels. London: Lloyd's Register of Shipping. 1922 – via Internet Archive.
- Lloyd's Register of Shipping. Vol. II.–Steamers and Motorships of 300 Tons Gross and Over. London: Lloyd's Register of Shipping. 1930 – via Southampton City Council.
- Lloyd's Register of Shipping. Vol. II.–Steamers and Motorships of 300 Tons Gross and Over. London: Lloyd's Register of Shipping. 1934 – via Southampton City Council.
- Lloyd's Register of Shipping. Vol. II.–Steamers and Motorships of 300 Tons Gross and Over. London: Lloyd's Register of Shipping. 1939 – via Southampton City Council.
- Lloyd's Register of Shipping. Vol. II.–Steamers and Motorships of 300 Tons. Trawlers, Tugs, Dredgers, Etc. London: Lloyd's Register of Shipping. 1941 – via Southampton City Council.
- Rottman, Gordon (2005). Japanese Army in World War II : Conquest of the Pacific 1941-42. Oxford: Osprey Publishing. ISBN 1841767891.
