= Japanese invasion of Lamon Bay =

Japanese amphibious operation during World War II

- Part of the Philippines campaign (1941–1942), Pacific Theater
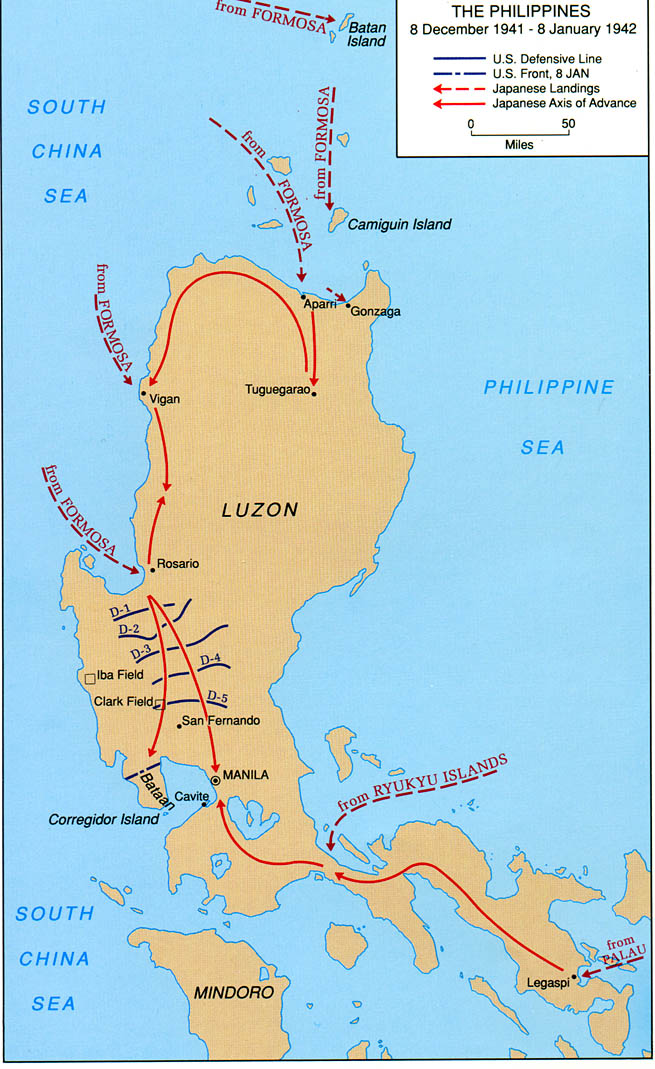
- A map of Luzon Island showing Japanese landings and advances from 8 December 1941 to 8 January 1942.
Date	21–23 December 1941
Location	Luzon, Philippines
Result	Japanese victory
Territorial changes	South Luzon Force was ordered to retreat to Bataan after Japanese secured a beachhead in Mauban, Atimonan, and Siain.

Belligerents
Japan	United States; Philippines

Commanders and leaders
Susumu Morioka; Nariyoshi Tsunehiro	George M. Parker; Albert Jones; Simeon De Jesus

Units involved
Ground units: Japanese Fourteenth Army; 16th Division; 9th Infantry Regiment; 33rd Infantry Regiment; 2nd Battalion, 20th Infantry; 22nd Field Artillery; Armored Detachment; Artillery Batteries; Air units: Japanese 5th Air Army; 8th Air Regiment; Naval units: Japanese Imperial Navy; 2nd Fleet	Ground units: Philippine Commonwealth Army; 51st Infantry Division; 51st Infantry Regiment (less 1st Bn); 51st Infantry Regiment; 52nd Infantry Regiment; 51st Field Artillery Regiment; 1st Infantry Regiment (Regular); Philippine Constabulary; 51st Provisional Infantry Brigade (PC); Air units: US Army Air Corps; 21st US Pursuit Squadron

Strength
7,000	20,000

The Japanese invasion of Lamon Bay (Filipino: Paglusob ng mga Hapones sa Look ng Lamon) was a secondary mission in the Japanese invasion of Lingayen Gulf during the 1941-1942 Japanese conquest of the Philippines. Securing the coast southeast of Manila would complete the Japanese encirclement of the capital and would act as a diversionary attack from the Japanese main invasion force from the north.

== Disposition of forces ==
Lamon Bay is a large bay on the eastern shore of Luzon, south of Manila. However, in December prevailing winds made it a poor landing site and it was isolated from Manila by the Tayabas Isthmus.

The Lamon Bay invasion force was led by Lt General Susumu Morioka, and consisted of 7000 men of the IJA 16th Division. Morioka called for a three-prong landing at Mauban, Atimonan, and Siain, with his forces to advance immediately upon landing along Route 1 towards Laguna de Bay without waiting to secure the narrow landing site.

The invasion force departed Amami Ōshima on 17 December in 24 transports only six hours after the Lingayen Bay invasion force sailed from Taiwan. The Lamon Bay force was escorted by only four destroyers and four minesweepers, but en route they were joined by Rear Admiral Kyuji Kubo with one light cruiser, two destroyers, two minesweepers and one minelayer from the Legaspi operation. On 23 December, the convoy was sighted by USS Sculpin (SS-191), but the American submarine was unable to cause any damage. On the morning of 24 December the convoy reached Lamon Bay.

American opposition to these landings was highly disorganized. The area was nominally under the control of Major General George M. Parker and the South Luzon Force with the Philippine Commonwealth Army's 41st Division and part of the 51st Division. Much of the remainder of the 51st Division had been moved south to counter the Japanese invasion of Legaspi. Other troops were still in the process of moving into position when the Japanese landed, and suffered from lack of artillery. What little artillery the South Luzon Force possessed was all based on the west coast and MacArthur refused Parker's request for additional guns several times.

The Lamon Bay invasion force consisted of the following ships:

- 1 light cruiser (Nagara)
- 1 heavy cruiser (Ashigara)
- 6 destroyers (Kawakaze, Suzukaze, Tokitsukaze, Umikaze, Yamakaze, Yukikaze)
- 1 minelayer (Aotaka)
- 2 minesweepers (W-7, W-8)
- 1 gunboat/minelayer (Ikushima Maru)
- 4 gunboats (Busho Maru, Keiko Maru, Kanko Maru, Myoken Maru)
- 2 subchasers (Shonan Maru No. 17, Takunan Maru No. 5)
- 1 netlayer (Fukuei Maru No. 15)
- 20 Imperial Japanese Army transports (Bengal Maru, Dainichi Maru, Durban Maru, Kaimei Maru, Kayo Maru, Kitano Maru, Kofuku Maru, Lisbon Maru, Nagato Maru, Nichiren Maru, Ryoka Maru, Ryuyo Maru, Shinsei Maru, Shinshu Maru, Taian Maru, Tamon Maru No. 5, Tatsuno Maru, Tofuku Maru, Toyama Maru, Toyohashi Maru)
- 4 Imperial Japanese Navy transports (Hakusan Maru, Kimishima Maru, Myoko Maru, Senko Maru)

== The landing ==
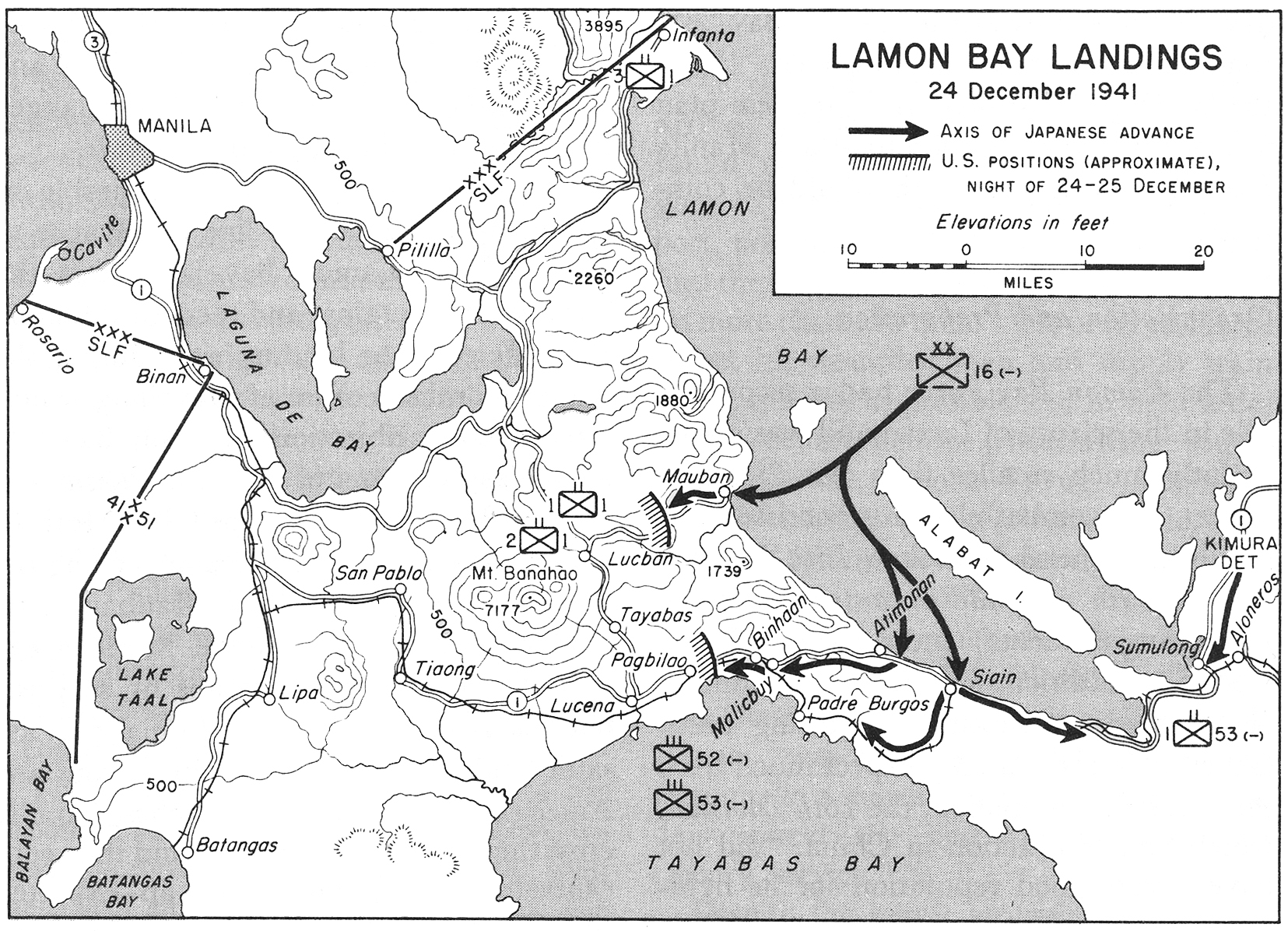
Lamon Bay landings on December 24, 1941

The first Japanese detachment to land was the 2nd Battalion of the 20th Infantry Regiment under Lt Col Nariyoshi Tsunehiro at Mauban. Coming ashore at dawn on 24 December under cover by aircraft provided by the seaplane carrier Mizuho, the Japanese immediately came under attack by the Philippine 1st Infantry, which was dug in on the beach. American aircraft also attacked the transport convoy. However, by 0800 the Philippine Army had been pushed off the beach and by 0830 the town of Mauban was secured. The Philippine Army fell back five miles to the west, halting the Japanese advance towards Lucban and the south shore of Laguna de Bay at 1430.

The second detachment, with the 1st Battalion of the 20th infantry regiment landed without opposition at Siain to cover the left flank of the main invasion force, and to act as a reserve. One company was sent along the Manila Railroad to Tayabas Bay and the main force moved southeast to join with the Kimura Detachment, which was moving northwest from Legaspi. The columns joined on 27 December, cut off their escape route of the survivors of the Philippine 51st Division who were still retreating from Legaspi.

Morioka's main force came ashore two miles south of Atimonan. This included the bulk of the 20th Infantry, 16th Reconnaissance Regiment, and 22nd Field Artillery. The 20th Infantry occupied Atimonan by 1100 despite stubborn resistance by the Philippine Army, while the 16th Reconnaissance bypassed the town and pushed across the mountains to Malicbuy where the 2nd Battalion of the Philippine 52nd Infantry was still in the process of setting up defenses. With assistance of bombers from the IJAAF 8th Air Regiment, the 16th Reconnaissance quickly overwhelmed the defenders.

The next American defensive line was set up at a river near Binahaan, about four miles to the west of Malicbuy. However, by late afternoon, Morioka's main forces had completed mopping up operations in Atimonan, and the Japanese were thus able to bring their full force against the American position at Binahaan. The Americans retreated under cover of darkness along Route 1 to Pagbilao, with the Japanese in pursuit.

== Consequences ==
By the evening of 24 December, the Japanese had successfully landed at Lamon Bay, and at the cost of only 84 killed and 184 wounded had completed its encirclement of the approaches to Manila from the south. To the north, the Lingayen Gulf invasion forces had similarly achieved its objectives in securing the northern and eastern approaches to Manila. General Masaharu Homma, who had a poor opinion of the quality of the IJA 16th Division based on its combat record in China, expressed considerable surprise at the success. By evening of 24 December, General Homma transferred his staff ashore at Bauang, where he set up the IJA 14th Army HQ in preparation for the final drive on Manila.
