= Japanese invasion of Legazpi =

Part of the Philippines campaign of WW2

- Part of Philippines campaign (1941–1942), Pacific War
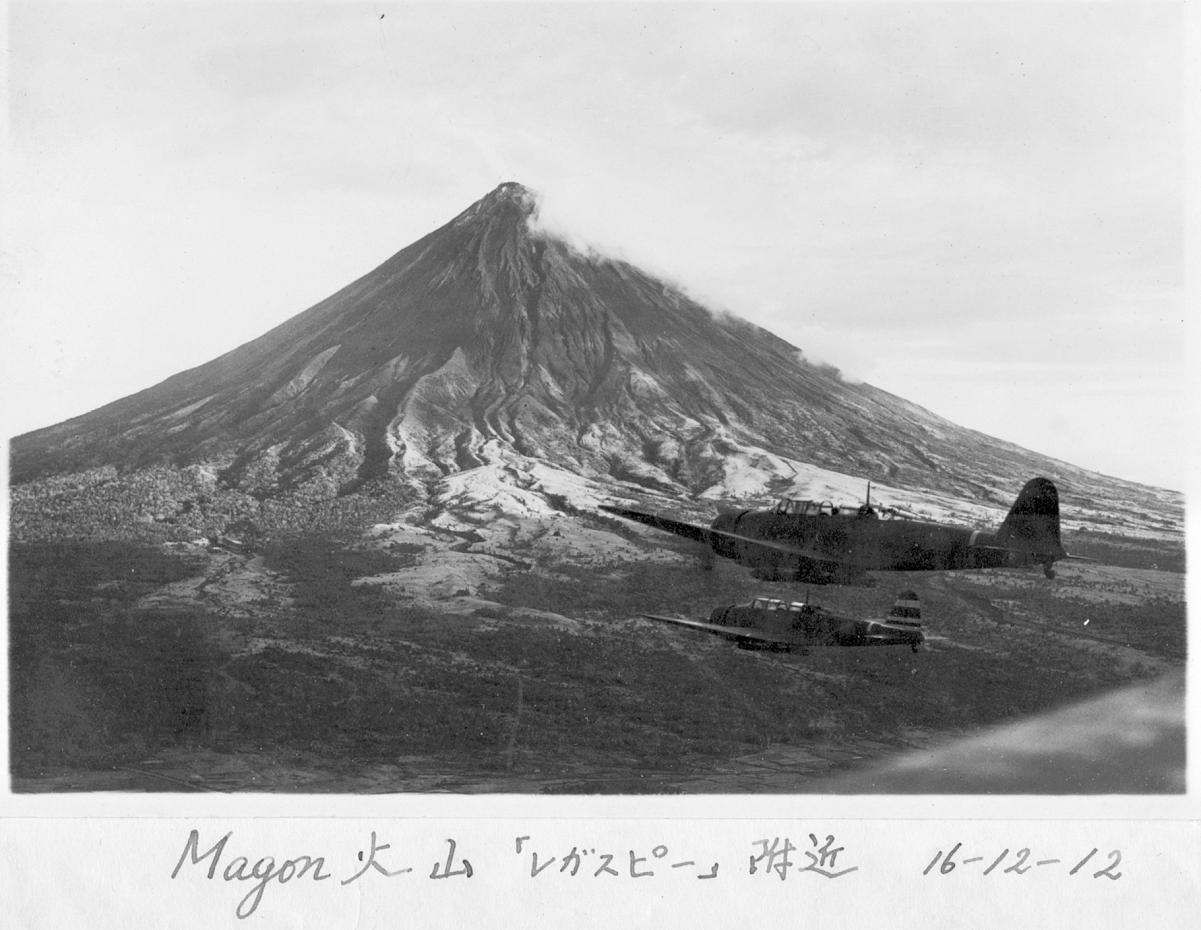
- Japanese bombers from the aircraft carrier Ryujo attack Legazpi, December 12, 1941
Date	12 December 1941
Location	Legazpi, Albay, Philippines
Result	Japanese victory

Belligerents
Japan	United States; Philippines

Commanders and leaders
(Empire of Japan) Naoki Kimura (Empire of Japan) Kyuji Kubo (Empire of Japan) Ibō Takahashi	(United States) George M. Parker

Units involved
16th Division; Kimura Detachment; Kure 1st SNLF	Far East Air Force; 51st Infantry Division; 51st Engineer Battalion; 52nd Infantry Regiment

Strength
2,500 IJA troops; 575 SNLF troops; 2 light cruiser; 13 destroyers; 3 heavy cruisers; 1 aircraft carrier; 2 seaplane tenders; 2 minesweepers; 2 patrol vessels; 7 transports	2 fighter aircraft; 3 B-17 bombers; 1 engineer battalion; 2 infantry companies

Casualties and losses
3 killed 9 aircraft destroyed	2 B-17 bombers lost

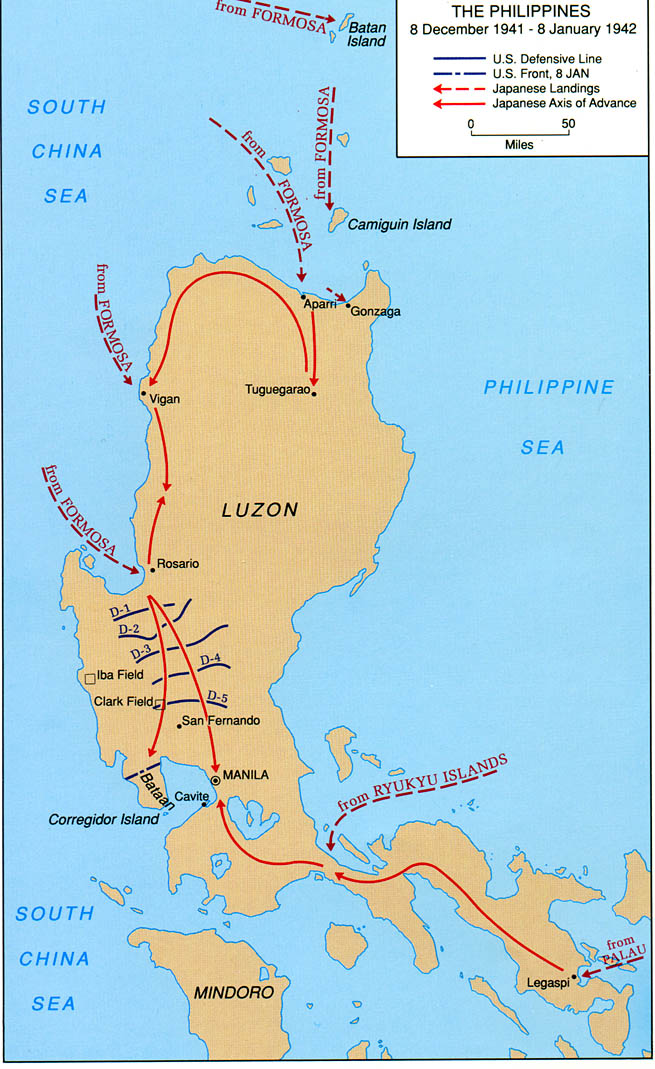
A map of Luzon Island showing Japanese landings and advances from 8 December 1941 to 8 January 1942

The Japanese invasion of Legazpi (Filipino: Paglusob ng mga Hapones sa Legazpi, Bikol: Pagsakyada kan mga Hapon sa Legazpi) on 12 December 1941 was one in a series of advance landings made by Imperial Japanese forces as first step in their invasion of the Philippines. The purpose was to obtain control of local air strips, which could be used as forward bases by fighter aircraft for operations in central Luzon. Control of Legazpi was an important point in the Japanese strategy, as it would also give them control of San Bernardino Strait, between the islands Luzon and Samar, which would prevent the Americans from bringing in reinforcements from the south. The first invasion was at Batan Island on 8 December 1941. This was followed by Vigan, Aparri, Legazpi, Davao, and Jolo Island over the next few days

== Disposition of forces ==
Legazpi is the capital of Albay Province, in far southern Luzon at the southern end of the Bicol Peninsula. The city of Legazpi was an important seaport, and the southern terminus of the Manila Railway.

The area of Legazpi was in theory defended by General Wainwright's South Luzon Force with two infantry divisions, the 41st Division to the west and the 51st Division to the east. With these two divisions, Parker was expected to cover a very large geographic area with five large bays suitable for amphibious operations, and over 400 kilometres (250 miles) of coastline suitable for landings. Moreover, both divisions were undermanned, poorly trained, and suffered from a serious shortage of equipment. In addition, the situation was complicated further in that the enlisted troops spoke only the local Bikol languages, whereas the officers spoke only Tagalog and English.

On the Japanese side, General Homma had organized a detachment of 2500 men from the IJA 16th Division, led by Major General Naoki Kimura, with the Infantry Group HQ, 33rd Infantry Regiment and a battery from the 22nr Field Artillery Regiment. He also had a detachment of 575 men from the Kure 1st SNLF.

The invasion force was supported by a large fleet from the Imperial Japanese Navy led by Rear Admiral Kyuji Kubo, consisting of the light cruiser Nagara, the destroyers Yamakaze, Suzukaze, Kawakaze, Umikaze, Yukikaze, Tokitsukaze, the seaplane tenders Mizuho and Chitose, two minesweepers, two patrol vessels and seven transports.

Distant cover was provided by Vice Admiral Ibō Takahashi with the aircraft carrier Ryūjō, heavy cruisers Haguro, Myōkō and Nachi and the destroyer Shiokaze. In addition, the covering fleet was accompanied by Destroyer Squadron 2 with the light cruiser Jintsu and destroyers Amatsukaze, Hayashio, Kuroshio, Hatsukaze, Natsushio, and Oyashio, which was tasked with minelaying operations in San Bernardino Straits.

== Landing and aftermath ==
The Kimura Detachment landed at Legazpi on the morning of 12 December without opposition, as the nearest American forces were over 240 km (150 mi) away. By 09:00 they were in control of both the airfield and the railroad. The following day, the Japanese naval covering force withdrew to Palau.

The Philippine 51st Division sent an engineering battalion south into the Bicol Peninsula to destroy bridges and to prevent railroad equipment from falling into the hands of the Japanese. The first American counterattack was a strafing attack on 12 December by two fighter aircraft of the Far East Air Force on the newly captured airstrip at Legazpi, killing three Japanese. This was followed by an attack by three Boeing B-17 Flying Fortress bombers, which destroyed nine Japanese aircraft on legazpi runway. However, only one of the B-17s made it back to its base at Del Monte Airfield.

Once the city of Legazpi was secure, Kimura sent his forces north on Highway 1 to capture the city of Naga, the capital of Camarines Sur Province on 18 December. Continuing north from Naga and repairing bridges as they advanced, the Japanese reached the town of Sipocot on 19 December and Daet, capital of Camarines Norte Province on 21 December. General Parker ordered two companies of the 52nd Infantry to make a stand north of Sipocot, as the Bicol Peninsula is very narrow in that area, enabling a small force to considerably delay the Japanese advance. In the early morning of 22 December, a company from the Kimura Detachment engaged the Americans. However, the 52nd Infantry had a good geographic position, and was able to push the Japanese 10 km (6 mi) south.

However, on 23 December, the Japanese made a landing at Atimonan, the capital of Quezon Province to the north of the American positions. Although thus encircled, a portion of the 52nd Infantry managed to make its way back to American lines.

== Consequences ==
In retrospect, the advance landings by the Japanese in southern Luzon, including at Legazpi, largely accomplished its strategic objective of encircling the American forces in central Luzon, preventing both escape and reinforcement. Tactically, the air fields seized were small, and with the rapid advance of the Japanese into both central and southern Luzon, were soon unnecessary for further operations.
