= W-1-class minesweeper =

Japanese minesweeper class

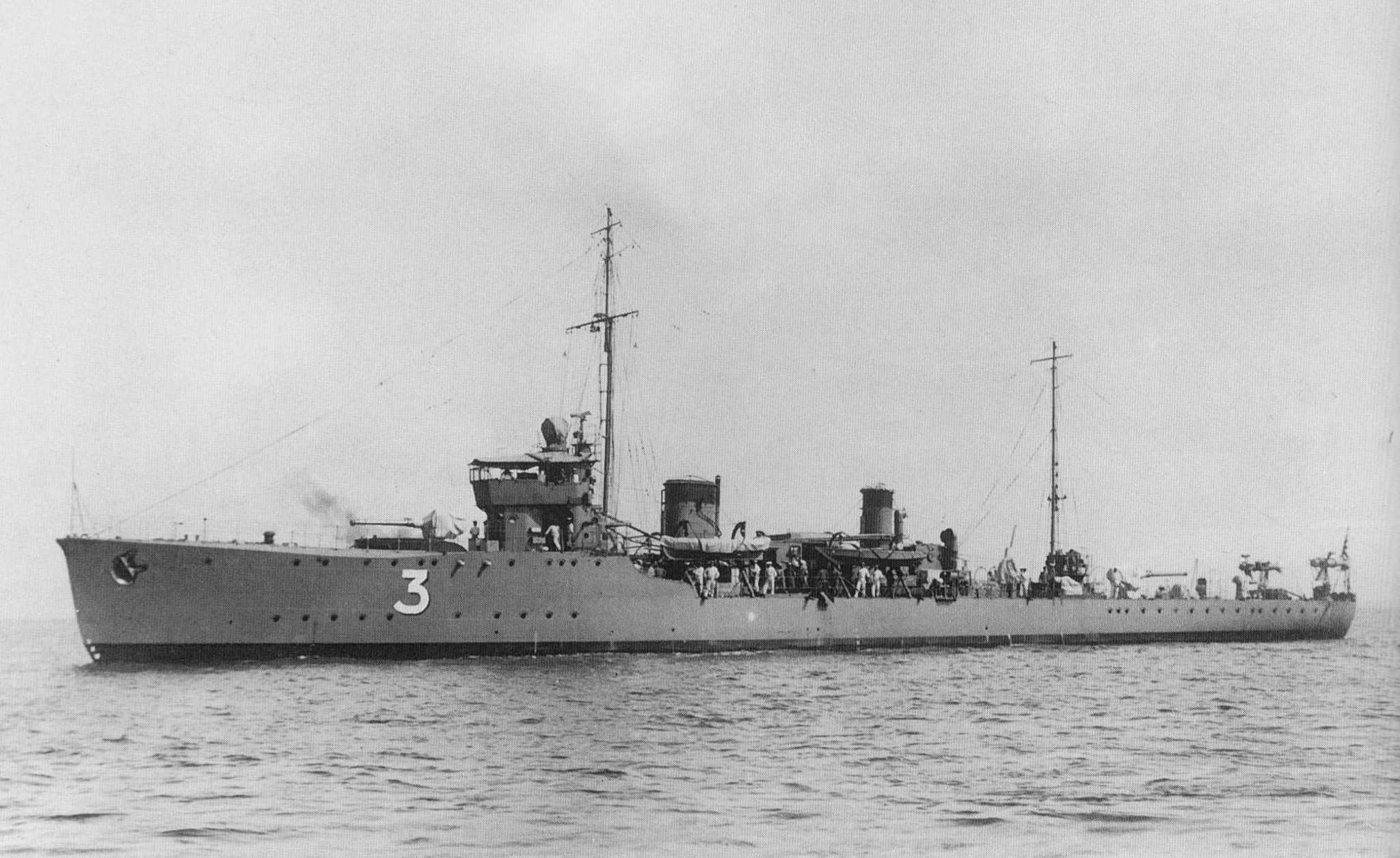
- W-3 in 1923

Class overview
- Name: W-1-class minesweeper
- Builders: Sasebo Naval Arsenal; Harima Zōsen; Mitsui Bussan; Ōsaka Iron Works
- Operators: Imperial Japanese Navy
- Succeeded by: W-13 class
- Subclasses: W-1 class (Project Number I1); W-5 class (Project Number I2)
- Cost: 700,000 JPY (in 1920)
- Built: 1922–1929
- In commission: 1923–1946
- Planned: 6
- Completed: 6
- Lost: 5
- Scrapped: 1

General characteristics W-1-class
- Type: Minesweeper
- Displacement: 600 long tons (610 t) standard
- Length: 76.20 m (250 ft 0 in) overall
- Beam: 8.03 m (26 ft 4 in)
- Draught: 2.29 m (7 ft 6 in)
- Installed power: 3 × Kampon coal-fired boilers; 4,000 shp (3,000 kW)
- Propulsion: 2 shafts, 2 × triple-expansion steam engines
- Speed: 20.0 knots (37.0 km/h; 23.0 mph)
- Range: 2,000 nmi (3,700 km; 2,300 mi) at 10 knots (19 km/h; 12 mph)
- Complement: 97
- Armament: 2 × 120 mm (4.7 in) L/45 naval guns; 1 × 76.2 mm (3.00 in) L/40 AA gun; 18 × depth charges; 2 × Type 81 depth charge projectors; 1 × paravane or 50 × Mk.5 naval mines

General characteristics W-5-class (differences only)
- Displacement: 620 long tons (630 t) standard
- Length: 77.00 m (252 ft 7 in) overall
- Beam: 8.25 m (27 ft 1 in)
- Draught: 2.25 m (7 ft 5 in)
- Complement: 91
- Armament: 2 × paravanes or 50 × Mk.5 naval mines

The W1 class minesweeper (第一号型掃海艇,, Dai Ichi Gō-gata Sōkaitei) was a class of minesweepers of the Imperial Japanese Navy (IJN), serving during the 1930s and World War II. 6 vessels were built in 1922–29 under the Eight-eight fleet plan. They have two sub-classes, this article handles them collectively.

== Background ==
In 1920, the IJN developed an Eight-eight Fleet Plan which would provide them with eight modern battleships and eight battle cruisers. However, they did not forget the Hatsuse and Yashima, which had struck naval mines during the Russo-Japanese War; afraid of such events occurring again, the IJN also ordered the No.1-class of purpose-built minesweepers, to replace converted old destroyers in the minesweeping role.

As the IJN anticipated its minesweepers to operate in front of the main battle fleet, and therefore to encounter enemy warships, the No.1-class were more heavily armed than minesweepers of other nations, with each ship mounting two 120 mm (4.7 in) L/45 naval guns. In addition each ship could carry 50 naval mines, making them multi-purpose vessels visually resembling small destroyers.

== Ships in classes ==
=== No.1 class ===
- Project number I1. 4 vessels were built in 1922–1925. W-4 was behind with the laid down by the Washington Naval Treaty.

Ship	Builder	Laid down	Launched	Completed	Fate
W-1	Harima Zōsen	10 May 1922	6 March 1923	30 June 1923	Sunk by air raid at Yamada Bay on 10 August 1945; removed from naval ship list on 15 September 1945.
W-2	Mitsui, Tama Shipyard	13 April 1922	17 March 1923	30 June 1923	Sunk by friendly torpedo from Mogami or Mikuma at Bantam Bay during the Battle of Sunda Strait on 1 March 1942; removed from naval ship list on 30 November 1945.
W-3	Ōsaka Iron Works		29 March 1923	30 June 1923	Sunk by USS Parche at Ōfunato Bay on 9 April 1945; removed from naval ship list on 10 May 1945.
W-4	Sasebo Naval Arsenal	1 December 1923	24 April 1924	29 April 1925	Survived the war; scuttled by Royal Navy off Singapore on 11 July 1946; removed from naval ship list on 10 August 1946.

=== No.5 class ===
- Project number I2. 2 vessels were built in 1928 and 1929. Improved model of the No.1-class. In terms of their appearance, their foremast was changed to a tripod-type.

Ship	Builder	Laid down	Launched	Completed	Fate
W-5	Mitsui, Tama Shipyard	25 March 1928	30 October 1928	25 February 1929	Sunk by HMS Terrapin at Strait of Malacca 33°44′N 99°50′E on 4 November 1944; removed from naval ship list on 10 March 1945.
W-6	Ōsaka Iron Works	10 March 1928	29 October 1928	25 February 1929	Sunk by air raid off Kuching 01°34′N 110°21′E on 26 December 1941; removed from naval ship list on 10 January 1942.

== Photos ==
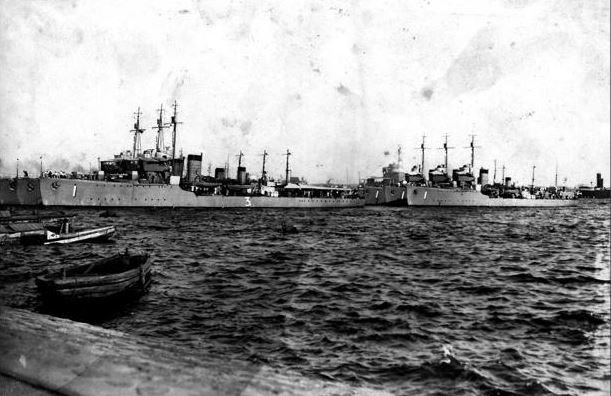
1st Minesweeping Squadron W-3 and W-2 in front

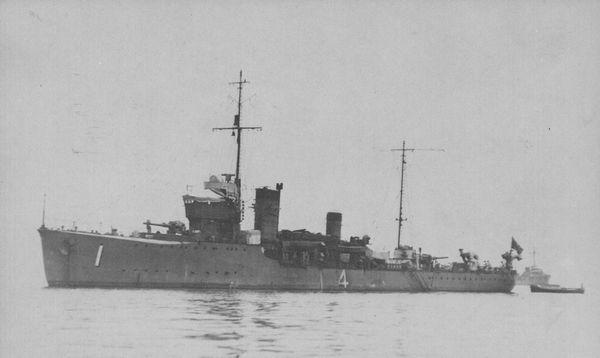
W-4 in July 1930

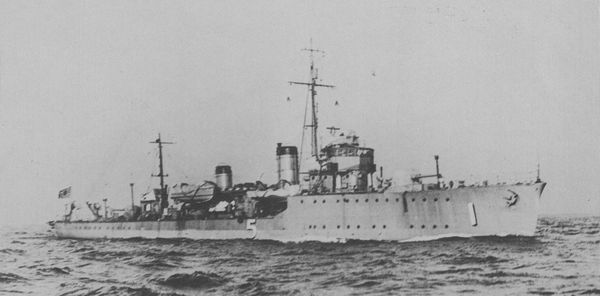
W-5 in the 1930s (after the Tomozuru-Incident)

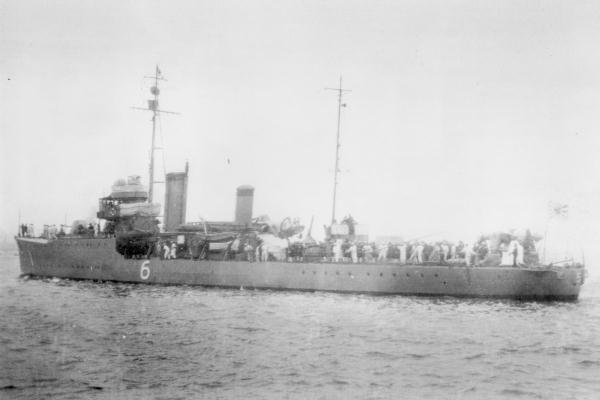
W-6 on 28 May 1933

== Bibliography ==
- Jentschura, Hansgeorg; Jung, Dieter & Mickel, Peter (1977). Warships of the Imperial Japanese Navy, 1869–1945. Annapolis, Maryland: United States Naval Institute. ISBN 0-87021-893-X.
- Ships of the World special issue Vol.45, Escort Vessels of the Imperial Japanese Navy, "Kaijinsha"., (Japan), February 1996
- The Maru Special, Japanese Naval Vessels No.50, Japanese minesweepers and landing ships, "Ushio Shobō". (Japan), April 1981
