= Japanese destroyer Suzukaze =

Destroyer of the Imperial Japanese Navy

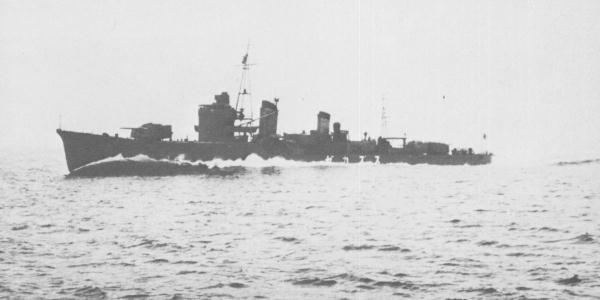
- Suzukaze on trial run at Uraga Channel, Summer 1937.

History

Empire of Japan
- Name: Suzukaze
- Ordered: 1934 FY
- Builder: Uraga Dock Company
- Laid down: 9 July 1935
- Launched: 11 March 1937
- Commissioned: 31 August 1937
- Stricken: 10 March 1944
- Fate: Torpedoed and sunk, 25 January 1944

General characteristics
- Class & type: Shiratsuyu-class destroyer
- Displacement: 1,685 long tons (1,712 t)
- Length: 103.5 m (340 ft) pp; 107.5 m (352 ft 8 in) waterline
- Beam: 9.9 m (32 ft 6 in)
- Draft: 3.5 m (11 ft 6 in)
- Propulsion: 2 shaft Kampon geared turbines; 3 boilers, 42,000 hp (31,000 kW)
- Speed: 34 knots (39 mph; 63 km/h)
- Range: 4,000 nmi (7,400 km) at 18 kn (33 km/h)
- Complement: 226
- Armament: 5 × 12.7 cm/50 Type 3 naval guns (2×2, 1×1); 2 × 13.2 mm (0.52 in) AA guns; 8 × 24 in (610 mm) torpedo tubes; 16 × Depth charges

Service record
- Operations: Battle of Tarakan (1942); Battle of the Java Sea (1942); Battle of Midway (1942); Battle of the Santa Cruz Islands (1942); First Naval Battle of Guadalcanal (1942); Battle of Tassafaronga (1942); Battle of Kula Gulf (1943)

Suzukaze (涼風, "cool breeze") was the tenth and final vessel of ten Shiratsuyu-class destroyers, and the fourth to be built for the Imperial Japanese Navy under the Circle Two Program (Maru Ni Keikaku).

== History ==
The Shiratsuyu-class destroyers were modified versions of the Hatsuharu class, and were designed to accompany the Japanese main striking force and to conduct both day and night torpedo attacks against the United States Navy as it advanced across the Pacific Ocean, according to Japanese naval strategic projections. Despite being one of the most powerful classes of destroyers in the world at the time of their completion, none survived the Pacific War. Suzukaze, built at the Uraga Dock Company, was laid down on 9 July 1935, launched on 11 March 1937 and commissioned on 31 August 1937.

== Operational history ==
At the time of the attack on Pearl Harbor, Suzukaze was assigned to Destroyer Division 24 of Destroyer Squadron 4 of the IJN 2nd Fleet together with her sister ships Umikaze, Kawakaze, and Yamakaze, and had sortied from Palau as part of the Philippine invasion force, covering landings at Legaspi and Lamon Bay. From January 1942, Suzukaze participated in operations in the Netherlands East Indies, including the invasion of Tarakan Island. She was later assigned to patrols of Staring Bay in the Sulawesi, where she was torpedoed on 4 February 1942 by the submarine USS Sculpin. The resultant explosion killed nine crewmen and caused extensive damage, requiring a return to Sasebo Naval Arsenal at the end of March for repairs.

Suzukaze was reassigned to the IJN 1st Fleet on 10 April, and back to the IJN 2nd Fleet on 14 June. In mid-August, she returned to active duty, escorting the aircraft carrier Chitose to Truk and continuing on to join the rest of the fleet at Guadalcanal. After the Battle of the Eastern Solomons on 28 August, she escorted the damaged cruiser Jintsu back to Truk. In the remainder of August through early November, Suzukaze participated in twelve "Tokyo Express" high speed transport runs or surface attack missions to Guadalcanal, as well as participating briefly in the Battle of the Santa Cruz Islands on 26 October under Admiral Nobutake Kondō. During the First Naval Battle of Guadalcanal on the night of 12–13 November 1942, Suzukaze rescued 1100 survivors from the torpedoed transport Naka Maru. For the rest of the month, Suzukaze patrolled between Shortland Island, Buna and Rabaul. During the Battle of Tassafaronga on 30 November, Suzukaze barely avoided being struck by a salvo of torpedoes fired from the American destroyer USS Drayton.

In December 1942, Suzukaze continued in transport operations to Guadalcanal, suffering minor damage in an air raid on 1 January 1943, necessitating repairs at Truk at the end of the month, and return to Sasebo in February. Repairs completed by mid-June, Suzukaze escorted the cruisers Kumano and Suzuya to Truk and on to Rabaul by the end of June. During the Battle of Kula Gulf on 5–6 July, Suzukaze assisted in sinking the cruiser USS Helena, taking a number of hits in return which disabled her forward guns. After repairs at Yokosuka in late July, Suzukaze was assigned to escort missions between the Japanese home islands and Truk until early November. During a refit at Sasebo at the end of November, her “X” turret was removed and replaced by additional Type 96 anti-aircraft guns. From the end of December to end of January 1944, Suzukaze escorted numerous convoys to Truk and Ponape. On 25 January 1944, while escorting a convoy from Truk to Eniwetok, Suzukaze was torpedoed and sunk by the submarine USS Skipjack 127 nautical miles (235 km) north-northwest of Pohnpei (formerly Ponape) at position 08°51′N 157°10′E. She was removed from the navy list on 10 March 1944.
