= Japanese destroyer Umikaze (1936) =

Destroyer of the Imperial Japanese Navy

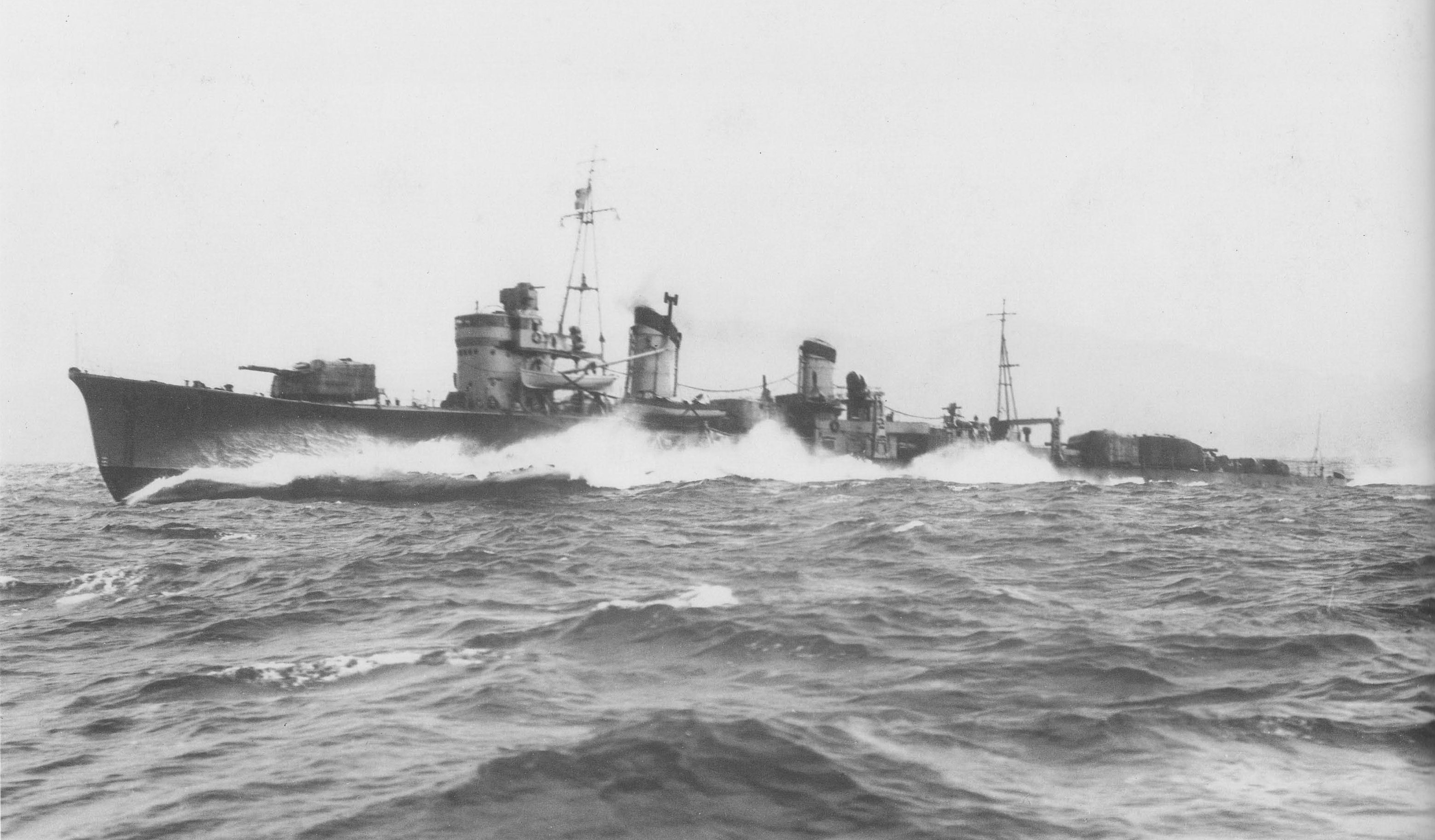
- Umikaze underway on 9 April 1937.

History

Empire of Japan
- Name: Umikaze
- Ordered: 1934 FY
- Builder: Maizuru Naval Arsenal
- Laid down: 4 May 1935
- Launched: 27 November 1936
- Commissioned: 31 May 1937
- Stricken: 31 March 1944
- Fate: Torpedoed and sunk, 1 February 1944

General characteristics
- Class & type: Shiratsuyu-class destroyer
- Displacement: 1,685 long tons (1,712 t)
- Length: 103.5 m (340 ft) pp; 107.5 m (352 ft 8 in) waterline
- Beam: 9.9 m (32 ft 6 in)
- Draft: 3.5 m (11 ft 6 in)
- Propulsion: 2 shaft Kampon geared turbines; 3 boilers, 42,000 hp (31,000 kW)
- Speed: 34 knots (39 mph; 63 km/h)
- Range: 4,000 nmi (7,400 km) at 18 kn (33 km/h)
- Complement: 226
- Armament: 5 × 12.7 cm/50 Type 3 naval guns (2×2, 1×1); 2 × 13.2 mm (0.52 in) AA guns; 8 × 24 in (610 mm) torpedo tubes; 16 × Depth charges

Service record
- Operations: Battle of Tarakan (1942); Battle of the Java Sea (1942); Battle of Midway (1942); Battle of the Santa Cruz Islands (1942); First Naval Battle of Guadalcanal (1942)

Umikaze (海風, ”Sea Breeze”) was the seventh of ten Shiratsuyu-class destroyers, and the first to be built for the Imperial Japanese Navy under the Circle Two Program (Maru Ni Keikaku). A U.S. Navy submarine torpedoed and sunk her on 1 February 1944, off Truk Atoll.

== History ==
The Shiratsuyu-class destroyers were modified versions of the Hatsuharu class, and were designed to accompany the Japanese main striking force and to conduct both day and night torpedo attacks against the United States Navy as it advanced across the Pacific Ocean, according to Japanese naval strategic projections. Despite being one of the most powerful classes of destroyers in the world at the time of their completion, none survived the Pacific War.

Umikaze, built at the Maizuru Naval Arsenal was laid down on 4 May 1935, launched on 27 November 1936 and commissioned on 31 May 1937.

== Operational history ==
At the time of the attack on Pearl Harbor, Umikaze was assigned to Destroyer Division 24 of Destroyer Squadron 4 of the IJN 2nd Fleet together with her sister ships Yamakaze, Kawakaze, and Suzukaze, and had sortied from Palau as part of the Philippine invasion force, covering landings at Legaspi and Lamon Bay. From January 1942, Umikaze participated in operations in the Netherlands East Indies, including the invasion of Tarakan Island, and landings at Balikpapan and Makassar. After participating in the invasion of eastern Java, Umikaze was engaged in convoy duty, and thus escaped combat during the Battle of the Java Sea.

In April, Umikaze assisted in the invasion of Panay and Negros in the Philippines. From 10 April, Umikaze was reassigned to the IJN 1st Fleet and returned to Sasebo Naval Arsenal for repairs at the end of May.

During the Battle of Midway on 4–6 June, Umikaze was part of the Aleutians Guard Force under Admiral Shirō Takasu. She was assigned back to the IJN 2nd Fleet on 14 July after the Midway Operation was cancelled.

Umikaze escorted the aircraft carrier Chitose from Yokosuka to Truk in mid-August, and continued on to Guadalcanal, where she was assigned to eleven “Tokyo Express” missions through the end of September. During a mission on 24 September, she suffered damage from a near miss by American aircraft, killing eight crewmen, and necessitating a return to Truk for repairs. In October, Umikaze participated in two missions to bombard Henderson Field on Guadalcanal, and on 26 October was part of Admiral Nobutake Kondō’s force at the Battle of the Santa Cruz Islands. After escorting cruisers Suzuya and Maya to Shortland Island and making another “Tokyo Express” run to Guadalcanal on 7 November, Umikaze was in the First Naval Battle of Guadalcanal on the night of 12–13 November 1942. On a troop transport run to Buna, Umikaze suffered heavy damage in an air strike by United States Army Air Forces B-17 Flying Fortress bombers, and had to be towed back to Rabaul by the destroyer Asashio for emergency repairs. Umikaze was withdrawn to Truk by the end of December and returned to Sasebo for repairs by 5 January 1943.

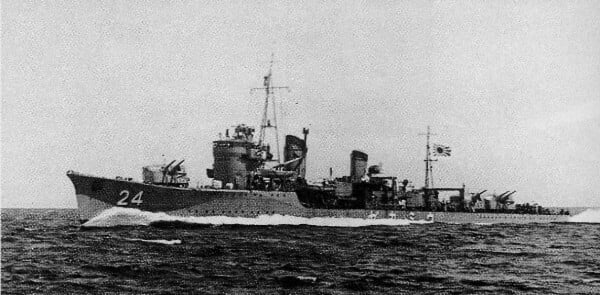
Umikaze training her gun turrets on sea trials, May 1937

Umikaze returned to active duty at the end of February 1943, escorting a troop convoy to Truk, and then conducting patrols out of Truk to the end of April. In May, after a troop transport run to Kolombangara, she accompanied the battleship Musashi from Truk to Yokosuka, returning with the aircraft carriers Chūyō and Unyō. In June, Umikaze led a troop transport mission to Ponape and Nauru and continued on with escort duties between Truk and the Japanese home islands through the end of November.

Umikaze went into dock at Sasebo in November, where her “X” turret was removed and replaced by additional Type 96 anti-aircraft guns. She returned to active duty at the end of December, escorting a troop convoy to Truk, and then patrolling out of Saipan from mid-January 1944. On 1 February 1944, while escorting a convoy from Saipan to Truk, Umikaze was torpedoed and sunk by the submarine USS Guardfish off the southern entrance to Truk Atoll (07°10′N 151°43′E). She sank slowly, allowing 215 survivors to escape, with 50 crewmen lost.

She was removed from the navy list on 31 March 1944.

== Bibliography ==
- D'Albas, Andrieu (1965). Death of a Navy: Japanese Naval Action in World War II. Devin-Adair Pub. ISBN 0-8159-5302-X.
- Brown, David (1990). Warship Losses of World War Two. Naval Institute Press. ISBN 1-55750-914-X.
- Howarth, Stephen (1983). The Fighting Ships of the Rising Sun: The Drama of the Imperial Japanese Navy, 1895–1945. Atheneum. ISBN 0-689-11402-8.
- Jentsura, Hansgeorg (1976). Warships of the Imperial Japanese Navy, 1869–1945. US Naval Institute Press. ISBN 0-87021-893-X.
- Lengerer, Hans (2007). The Japanese Destroyers of the Hatsuharu Class. Warship 2007. London: Conway. pp. 91–110. ISBN 978-1-84486-041-8.
- Nelson, Andrew N. (1967). Japanese–English Character Dictionary. Tuttle. ISBN 0-8048-0408-7.
- Watts, Anthony J (1967). Japanese Warships of World War II. Doubleday. ISBN 978-0-3850-9189-3.
- Whitley, M J (2000). Destroyers of World War Two: An International Encyclopedia. London: Arms and Armour Press. ISBN 1-85409-521-8.
