= Chidori-class torpedo boat =

Imperial Japanese Navy class of torpedo boats

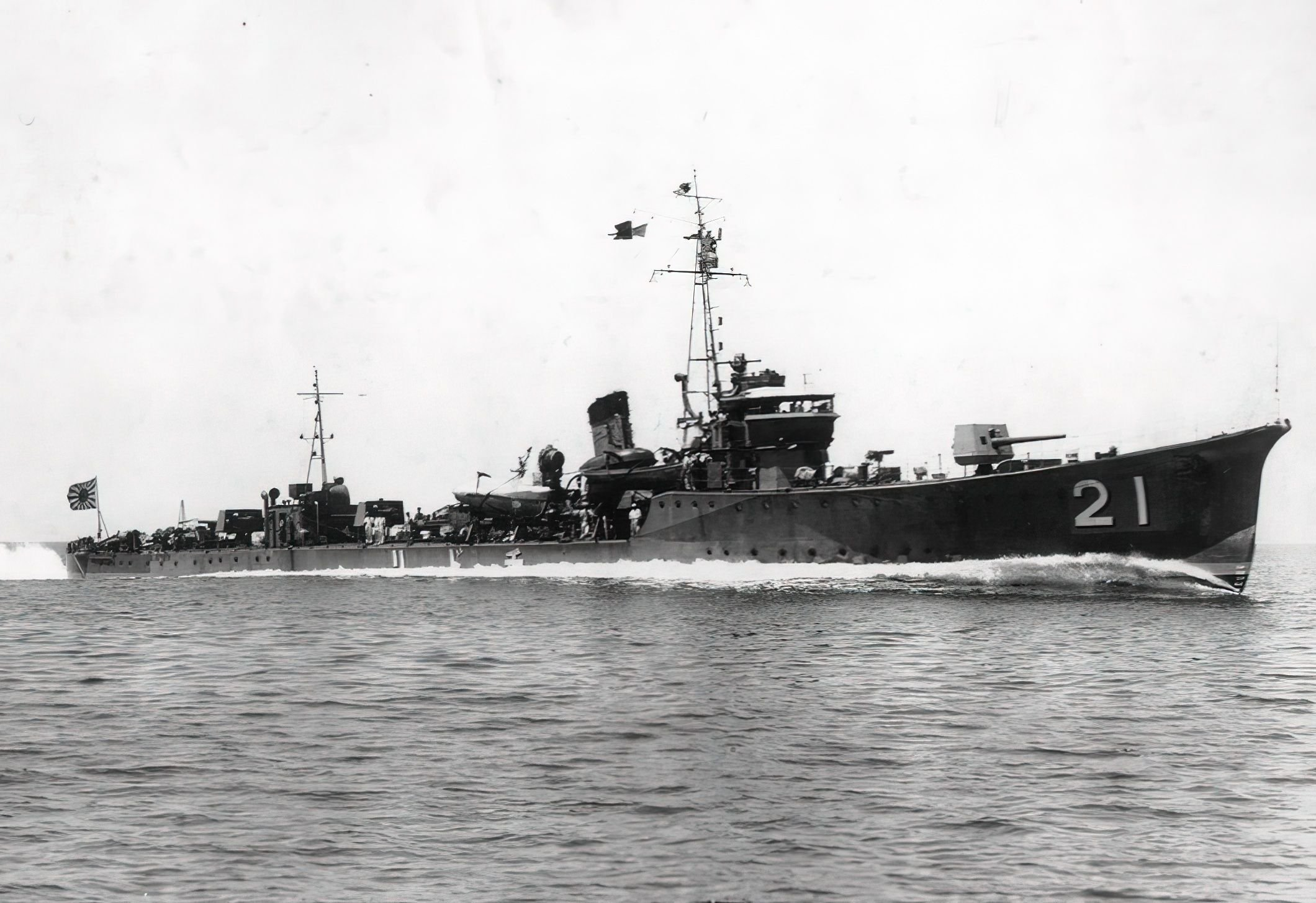
- Chidori on trial run off Maizuru, after 1934 refit

Class overview
- Name: Chidori-class torpedo boat
- Builders: Maizuru Naval Construction Department; Fujinagata Shipbuilding Yard
- Operators: Imperial Japanese Navy
- Preceded by: Hayabusa class
- Succeeded by: Ōtori class
- Built: 1931–34
- In service: 1933–45
- In commission: 1933–47
- Planned: 20
- Completed: 4
- Cancelled: 16 (replaced by Ōtori-class)
- Lost: 3
- Retired: 1

General characteristics as built
- Class & type: Chidori-class
- Type: Torpedo Boat
- Displacement: 535 long tons (544 t) for standard; 738 long tons (750 t) full load
- Length: 82.0 m (269 ft 0 in) overall; 79.0 m (259 ft 2 in) waterline
- Beam: 7.40 m (24 ft 3 in); 8.10 m (26 ft 7 in) w/ bulges
- Draft: 2.50 m (8 ft 2 in) (average)
- Propulsion: 2 × Kampon water tube boilers, 2 × Kampon impulse turbines, 2 shafts, 11,000 shp (8,200 kW)
- Speed: 30.0 knots (34.5 mph; 55.6 km/h)
- Range: 3,000 nmi (5,600 km) at 14 kn (16 mph; 26 km/h)
- Complement: 120
- Armament: 3 × 127 mm (5.0 in) Type 3 guns (1 × 2, 1 × 1); 1 × 12.7 mm (0.50 in) machine gun; 4 × 533 mm (21.0 in) torpedo tubes (2 × 2); 8 × 533 mm (21.0 in) torpedoes; 9 × depth charges

General characteristics after rebuilding
- Displacement: 600 long tons (610 t) (standard); 815 long tons (828 t) (full load)
- Draft: 2.38 m (7 ft 10 in)
- Speed: 28.0 knots (32.2 mph; 51.9 km/h)
- Range: 1,600 nmi (3,000 km) at 14 kn (16 mph; 26 km/h)
- Armament: Chidori, November 1934; 3 × 12 cm/45 3rd Year Type naval guns (3 × 1); 1 × 13.2 mm (0.52 in) machine gun; 2 × 533 mm (21.0 in) torpedo tubes (1 × 2); 9 × depth charges; Hatsukari, December 1944; 2 × 12 cm/45 3rd Year Type naval guns (2 × 1); 10 Type 96 25mm AA guns (10 × 1); 2 × 533 mm (21.0 in) torpedo tubes (1 × 2); 48 × depth charges

The Chidori-class torpedo boat (千鳥型水雷艇, Chidori-gata suiraitei) was an Imperial Japanese Navy class of torpedo boats that were built before and served during the Second World War. The design initially proved to have too much armament for its small displacement, and the capsizing of Tomozuru (友鶴) shortly after completion in heavy weather resulted in a scandal which called into question the basic design of many Japanese warships of the time. After extensive modification, the class became satisfactory sea-boats and saw service in the Battle of the Philippines and the Dutch East Indies campaign as escorts and continued in that role for the rest of the war. Three were sunk during the war and the fourth was seized by the British at Hong Kong after the end of the war, where it was scrapped later.

== Background ==
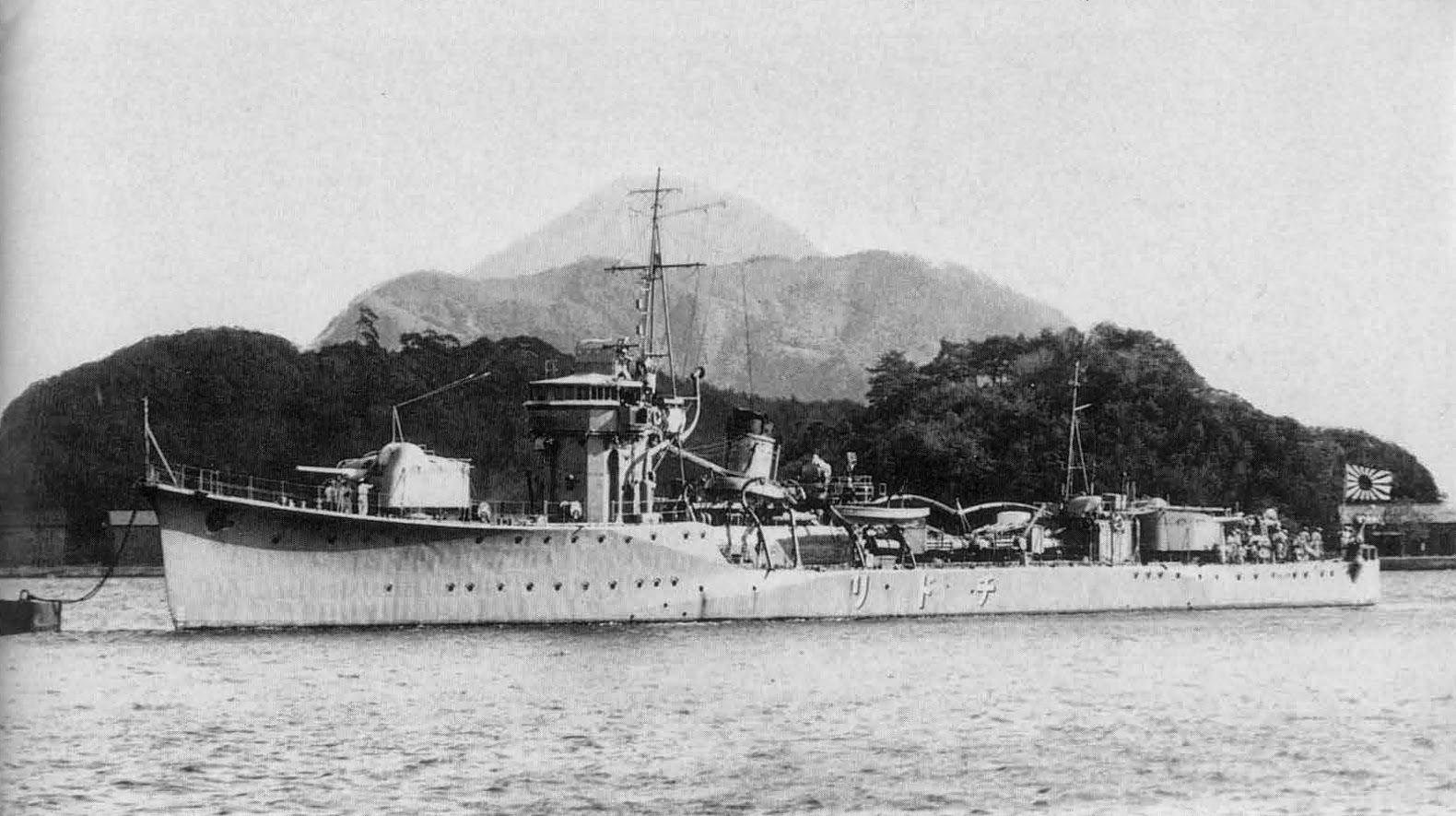
Initial look of Chidori (November 1933)

Per the terms of the 1930 London Naval Treaty, the Imperial Japanese Navy was constricted on the total tonnage of destroyers it was allowed to construct. In response, Japanese naval planners designed a 600-ton class vessel (which was small enough not to be limited by the treaty), but planned to arm it with half the armament of a Fubuki class destroyer. The new vessels were designated "torpedo boats" to further ensure that they would not be considered as "destroyers". Four vessels were ordered as part of the 1931 Maru 1 Programme, out of a planned twenty.

== Description ==
As initially completed the Chidori-class torpedo vessels displaced 535 long tons (544 t) at standard load, but displaced 738 long tons (750 t) at full load. They were 82.0 m (269 ft 0 in) long overall, had a beam 7.40 m (24 ft 3 in) and an average draft of 2.50 m (8 ft 2 in). Two Kampon geared turbines drove two shafts. They were powered by two Kampon water-tube boilers and produced a total of 11,000 shaft horsepower (8,200 kW). They were rated at 30.0 knots (34.5 mph; 55.6 km/h) and had a range of 3,000 nmi (5,600 km) at 14 kn (16 mph; 26 km/h) or 9,000 nmi (17,000 km) at 10 kn (12 mph; 19 km/h) using the 152 tonnes (150 long tons; 168 short tons) of fuel carried.

The Chidori-class were exceedingly heavily armed for their size. The main battery consisted of three 127 mm (5.0 in) Type 3 guns mounted in a single-gun power-driven gun turret placed on the forecastle, ahead of the bridge, and a power-driven twin-gun turret aft. Sources are contradictory on her anti-aircraft armament, Whitley says that they had a single license-built Vickers 40 mm (2 pounder pom pom) and others credit them with a single 12.7 mm (0.50 in) machine gun. Two sets of twin 533 mm (21.0 in) torpedo launchers were mounted abaft the single funnel. In total these weapons represented 22.7% of the displacement. One Type 94 depth charge launcher was also carried.

After the lead vessel Chidori was completed, it was discovered during trials that her center of gravity was too high and that she was 92 tonnes (91 long tons; 101 short tons) overweight. To compensate, 250 millimetres (9.8 in) bulges fitted to the rest of the class. However, this proved to be insufficient. The Tomozuru Incident of March 12, 1934, resulted in an extensive redesign in which the Type 3 guns were replaced by smaller single 12 cm/45 3rd Year Type naval guns and one of the twin torpedo launchers was removed. An additional 100 tons of ballast also helped lower the center-of-gravity, but also meant the top speed was reduced to 28 knots.

In 1944, the rear gun was removed and replaced with a twin-mount Type 96 25mm AA gun. Another twin-mount was located in front of the bridge and six single-mounts were added in various locations. The number of depth charges carried was also increased over the course of the war to 48.

== The Tomozuru Incident ==
On 12 March 1934, shortly after completion, Tomozuru (友鶴) sailed in company with her sister Chidori (千鳥) and the light cruiser Tatsuta for night torpedo training. The weather worsened during the exercise and it was called off at 0325; the ships returning to port. Tomozuru never arrived and a search was launched. She was spotted at 1405 that same day, capsized and inverted, but still afloat. Thirteen of her 113-man crew were rescued. She was towed to Sasebo and docked, where she was rebuilt and returned to service.

=== Consequences ===
This disaster forced the Imperial Japanese Navy to review the stability of every ship recently completed, under construction or still being designed. The Chidori'-class was forced to reduce its armament load and the bridge structure was cut down by one level. The bulges were removed, but displacement increased to 815 long tons (828 t) with the addition of 60–90 tonnes (59–89 long tons; 66–99 short tons) ballast. Their speed dropped to 28 knots (32 mph; 52 km/h) and range decreased to 1,600 nmi (3,000 km) at 14 kn (16 mph; 26 km/h). The remaining 16 vessels planned for the class were cancelled, and replaced by the Ōtori class torpedo boats, which were redesigned to reduce the top-heaviness that caused Tomozuru to capsize.

== Service ==
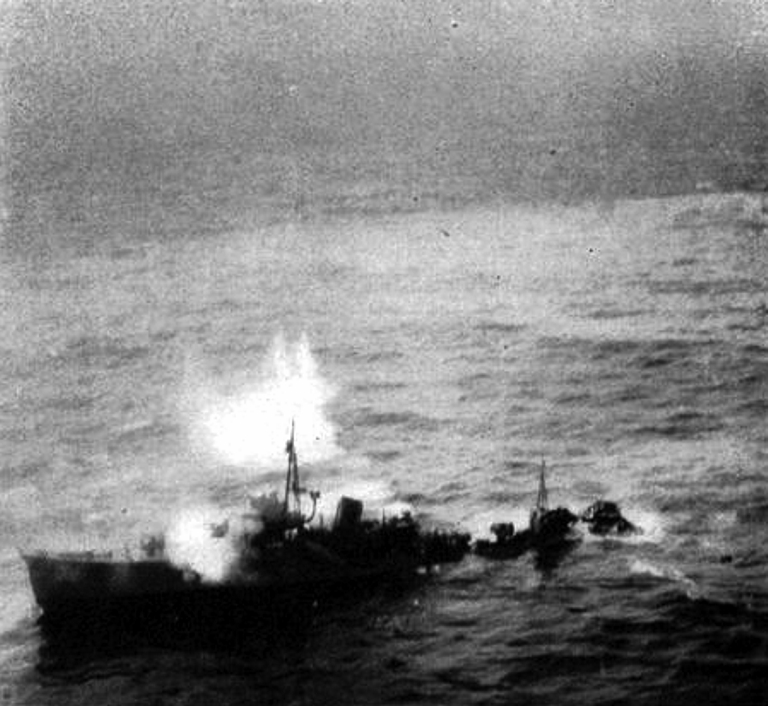
Tomozuru on 24 March 1945

In 1937, the four sisters were organized into Torpedo Flotilla 21 and made a sortie for the Battle of Shanghai. All four saw action in the Battle of the Philippines and the Dutch East Indies campaign. Chidori and Manazuru returned to home waters after Torpedo Flotilla 21 was disbanded in the spring of 1942 and were on escort duties for the rest of the war. Hatsukari and Tomozuru remained in that area for most of the rest of the war on escort operations. Tomozuru returned to Japan late in the war, but Hatsukari entered Hong Kong on 21 May 1945 and was engaged in anti-aircraft battles until the end of war. Following Japan's surrender, the Hatsukari was seized by the Royal Navy, and later scrapped.

== Ships in class ==
Construction data
Ship	Kanji	Builder	Laid down	Launched	Completed	Improved	Fate
Chidori	千鳥 ('plover')	Maizuru Naval Arsenal	13 October 1931	1 April 1933	20 November 1933	November 1934	Sunk 21 December 1944 by USS Tilefish (SS-307) west of Omaezaki 34°33′N 138°02′E
Manazuru	真鶴 ('white-naped crane')	Fujinagata Shipyards	22 December 1931	11 July 1933	31 January 1934	November 1934	Sunk 1 March 1945 by air raid at Naha 26°17′N 127°35′E
Tomozuru	友鶴 ('flight of cranes')	Maizuru Naval Arsenal	11 November 1932	1 October 1933	24 February 1934	May 1935	Sunk 24 March 1945 by air raid at west of Amami Ōshima 29°15′N 125°13′E
Hatsukari	初雁 ('first wild goose of the season')	Fujinagata Shipyards	6 April 1933	19 December 1933	15 July 1934		Captured by United Kingdom at the end of war; Decommissioned 3 May 1947, scrapped 1948

== Books ==
- Brown, David K. (2009). Weather and Warship Casualties 1934–1944. Warship 2009. London: Conways. pp. 143–53. ISBN 978-1-84486-089-0.
- Stille, Mark E. (2017). Imperial Japanese Navy Antisubmarine Escorts 1941–45. Oxford, UK: Osprey Publishing. ISBN 978-1-4728-1817-1.
- Watts, Anthony J. (1971). The Imperial Japanese Navy. Macdonald & Co. (Publishers). SBN 356-03045-8.
- Whitley, Michael J. (1988). Destroyers of World War 2. Cassell Publishing. ISBN 1-85409-521-8.
- "Rekishi Gunzō"., History of Pacific War Vol.62 Ships of The Imperial Japanese Forces, Gakken (Japan), January 2008, ISBN 978-4-05-605008-0
- Collection of writings by Sizuo Fukui Vol.5, Stories of Japanese Destroyers, Kōjinsha (Japan) 1993, ISBN 4-7698-0611-6
- Collection of writings by Sizuo Fukui Vol.10, Stories of Japanese Support Vessels, Kōjinsha (Japan), December 1993, ISBN 4-7698-0658-2
- Model Art Extra No.340, Drawings of Imperial Japanese Naval Vessels Part-1, Model Art Co. Ltd. (Japan), October 1989
- Model Art Ship Modelling Special No.25, Genealogy of Japanese Destroyers Part-2, Model Art Co. Ltd. (Japan), August 2007
- The Maru Special, Japanese Naval Vessels No.39 Japanese torpedo boats, Ushio Shobō (Japan), May 1980
- The Maru Special, War ship mechanism 4, Japanese destroyers, Ushio Shobō (Japan), November 1982
