= W-13-class minesweeper =

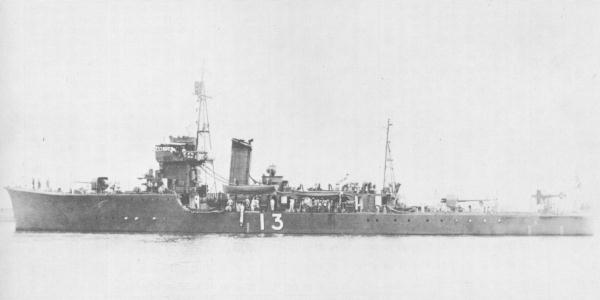
- No.13 in 1933

Class overview
- Name: No.13 class minesweeper
- Builders: Fujinagata Shipyards; Mitsui Bussan; Ōsaka Iron Works
- Operators: Imperial Japanese Navy
- Preceded by: No.1 class
- Succeeded by: No.7 class
- Subclasses: No.13 class (Project Number I3A); No.17 class (Project Number I3B)
- Cost: 1,330,000 JPY (in 1931)
- Built: 1931 – 1936
- In commission: 1933 – 1945
- Planned: 6
- Completed: 6
- Lost: 5
- Retired: 1

General characteristics No.13-class
- Displacement: 525 long tons (533 t) standard
- Length: 74.00 m (242 ft 9 in) overall
- Beam: 8.20 m (26 ft 11 in)
- Draught: 2.07 m (6 ft 9 in)
- Propulsion: 2 × triple expansion stages reciprocating engines; 2 × Kampon mix-fired boilers; 2 shafts, 3,200 shp
- Speed: 20.0 knots (23.0 mph; 37.0 km/h)
- Range: 2,600 nmi (4,800 km) at 12 kn (14 mph; 22 km/h)
- Complement: 98
- Armament: 2 × 120 mm (4.7 in) L/45 naval guns; 2 × 13.2 mm (0.52 in) AA guns; 18 × depth charges; 2 × Type 81 depth charge projectors; 2 × paravanes or 40 × Mk.5 naval mines

General characteristics No.17-class
- Displacement: 578 long tons (587 t) standard
- Length: 72.50 m (237 ft 10 in) overall
- Beam: 7.85 m (25 ft 9 in)
- Draught: 2.50 m (8 ft 2 in)
- Propulsion: 2 × Kampon geared turbines; 2 × Kampon mix-fired boilers; 2 shafts, 3,200 shp
- Speed: 19.0 knots (21.9 mph; 35.2 km/h)
- Range: 2,600 nmi (4,800 km) at 12 kn (14 mph; 22 km/h)
- Complement: 94
- Armament: 2 × 120 mm (4.7 in) L/45 naval guns; 2 × 13 mm AA guns; 36 × depth charges; 1 × Type 94 depth charge projector; 2 × paravanes or 40 × Mk.5 naval mines

The No.13 class minesweeper (第十三号型掃海艇,, Dai Jūsan Gō-gata Sōkaitei) was a class of minesweepers of the Imperial Japanese Navy (IJN), serving during the 1930s and World War II. 6 vessels were built in 1931-36 under the Maru 1 Keikaku. They have two sub classes, this article handles them collectively.

== Background ==
  - Improved model of the No.1-class. The IJN tried to a small hull than No.1-class to give a performance the same as No.1-class. And this attempt failed when the vessels were discovered to be top heavy by an investigation of the fleet in the aftermath of the Tomozuru Incident.

== Ships in classes ==
=== No.13 class ===
- Project number I3A. 4 vessels were built in 1931-1934. No.15 and No.16 were behind with the completed by the Tomozuru Incident. They had clipper-bow.

Ship	Builder	Laid down	Launched	Completed	Fate
No.13	Fujinagata Shipyards	22 December 1931	30 March 1933	31 August 1933	Sunk by bombardment from Netherlands pillbox at Tarakan Island on 12 January 1942. Decommissioned on 30 November 1945.
No.14	Ōsaka Iron Works	22 December 1933	20 March 1933	30 September 1933	Sunk by bombardment from Netherlands pillbox at Tarakan Island on 12 January 1942. Decommissioned on 30 November 1945.
No.15	Fujinagata Shipyards	6 April 1933	14 February 1934	21 August 1934	Heavily damaged by USS Tilefish on 5 March 1945, later agrounded. Decommissioned on 10 May 1945.
No.16	Mitsui, Tama Shipyard	20 June 1933	30 March 1934	29 September 1934	Sunk by air raid off Makassar 06°08′S 119°20′E on 11 September 1943. Decommissioned on 11 November 1943.

=== No.17 class ===
- Project number I3B. 2 vessels were built in 1935-1936. Improved model of the No.13-class. About their appearance, bow was changed to double-curvature bow and fitted Kampon geared turbine.

Ship	Builder	Laid down	Launched	Completed	Fate
No.17	Ōsaka Iron Works	28 January 1935	3 August 1935	15 January 1936	Decommissioned on 20 November 1945. Scrapped on 1 September 1948.
No.18	Mitsui, Tama Shipyard	2 February 1935	19 September 1935	30 April 1936	Sunk by air raid off Hainan 16°52′N 108°38′E on 26 November 1944. Decommissioned on 10 January 1945.

== Photo ==
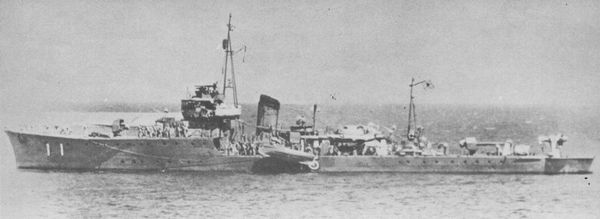
No.16

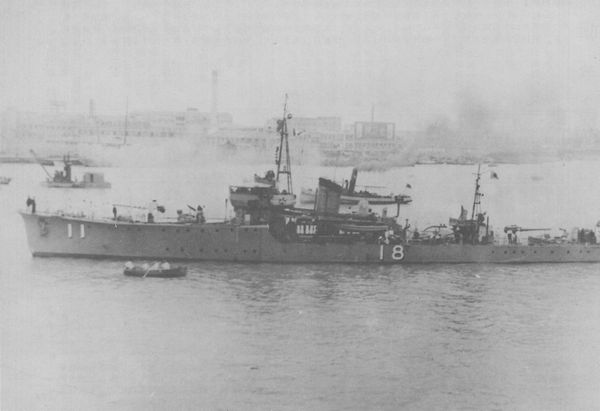
No.18

== Bibliography ==
- Ships of the World special issue Vol.45, Escort Vessels of the Imperial Japanese Navy, "Kaijinsha"., (Japan), February 1996
- The Maru Special, Japanese Naval Vessels No.50, Japanese minesweepers and landing ships, "Ushio Shobō". (Japan), April 1981
