= Japanese destroyer Nadakaze =

Destroyer of the Imperial Japanese Navy

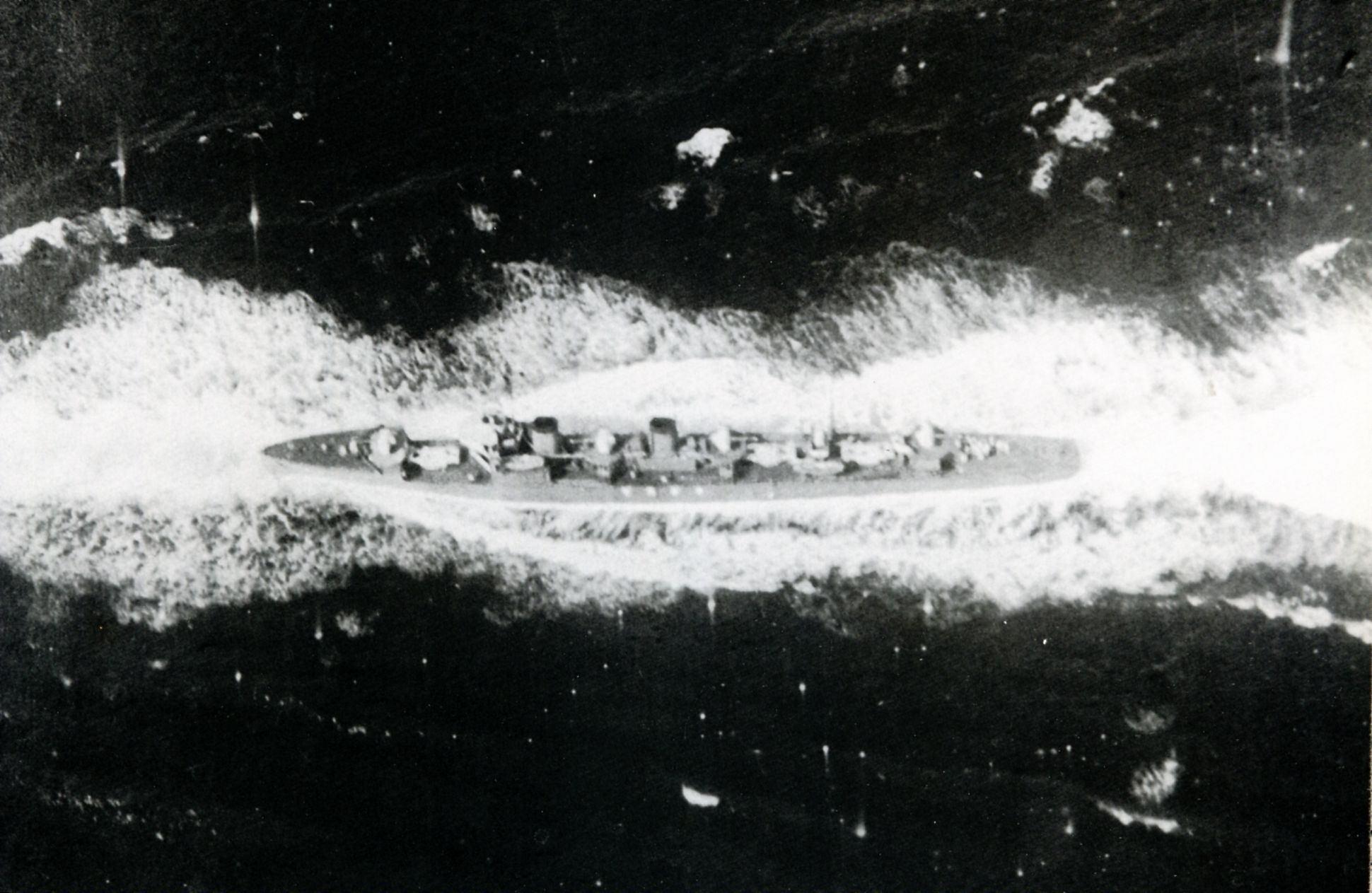
- Nadakaze on high speed trials, 1921

History

Empire of Japan
- Name: Nadakaze
- Ordered: 1918 fiscal year
- Builder: Maizuru Naval Arsenal
- Laid down: 9 January 1920
- Launched: 26 June 1920
- Completed: 30 September 1920
- Renamed: Patrol Boat No. 2, 1940
- Stricken: 30 September 1945
- Fate: Sunk on 25 July 1945

General characteristics (as built)
- Class & type: Minekaze-class destroyer
- Displacement: 1,366 t (1,344 long tons) (normal); 1,676 t (1,650 long tons) (deep load)
- Length: 97.5 m (319 ft 11 in) (pp); 102.5 m (336 ft 3 in) (o/a)
- Beam: 9.04 m (29 ft 8 in)
- Draft: 2.9 m (9 ft 6 in)
- Installed power: 38,500 shp (28,700 kW); 4 × Kampon water-tube boilers
- Propulsion: 2 shafts; 2 × Kampon geared steam turbines
- Speed: 39 knots (72 km/h; 45 mph)
- Range: 3,600 nmi (6,700 km; 4,100 mi) at 14 knots (26 km/h; 16 mph)
- Complement: 148
- Armament: 4 × single 12 cm (4.7 in) Type 3 guns; 3 × twin 53.3 cm (21.0 in) torpedo tubes; 20 × mines

General characteristics as Patrol Boat No. 2
- Class & type: Patrol Boat No. 2
- Displacement: 1,270 long tons (1,290 t) normal; 1,700 long tons (1,700 t) full load
- Installed power: 19,250 shp (14,350 kW); 2 boilers
- Speed: 20 knots (37 km/h; 23 mph)
- Armament: 2 × single Type 3 120 mm guns; 10 × 25 mm (0.98 in) Type 96 AA guns; 1 × twin 53.3 cm torpedo tubes; 16 × depth charges

Service record
- Operations: Second Sino-Japanese War; Pacific War

The Japanese destroyer Nadakaze (灘風, High Seas Wind) was one of 15 Minekaze-class destroyers built for the Imperial Japanese Navy (IJN) in the late 1920s. The ship was converted into a patrol boat in 1940 and then into a destroyer transport the next year. After the start of the Pacific War, she participated in the Philippines Campaign in late 1941, the Dutch East Indies campaign in early 1942 and played a minor role in the Battle of Midway in mid-1942. She was sunk by a British submarine in mid-1945.

== Design and description ==
The Minekaze class was designed with higher speed and better seakeeping than the preceding Kawakaze-class destroyers. The ships had an overall length of 102.5 meters (336 ft 3 in) and were 94.5 meters (310 ft 0 in) between perpendiculars. They had a beam of 9.04 meters (29 ft 8 in), and a mean draft of 2.9 meters (9 ft 6 in). The Minekaze-class ships displaced 1,366 metric tons (1,344 long tons) at standard load and 1,676 metric tons (1,650 long tons) at deep load. They were powered by two Parsons geared steam turbines, each driving one propeller shaft, using steam provided by four Kampon water-tube boilers. The turbines were designed to produce 38,500 shaft horsepower (28,700 kW), which would propel the ships at 39 knots (72 km/h; 45 mph). On her sea trials, Nadakaze reached a speed of 39.81 knots (73.73 km/h; 45.81 mph) from 40,511 shaft horsepower (30,209 kW). The ships carried 401 metric tons (395 long tons) of fuel oil which gave them a range of 3,600 nautical miles (6,700 km; 4,100 mi) at 14 knots (26 km/h; 16 mph). Their crew consisted of 148 officers and crewmen.

The main armament of the Minekaze-class ships consisted of four 12-centimeter (4.7 in) Type 3 guns in single mounts; one gun forward of the superstructure, one between the two funnels, one aft of the rear funnel, and the last gun atop the aft superstructure. The guns were numbered '1' to '4' from front to rear. The ships carried three above-water twin sets of 53.3-centimeter (21.0 in) torpedo tubes; one mount was in the well deck between the forward superstructure and the forward gun and the other two were between the aft funnel and aft superstructure. They could also carry 20 mines as well as minesweeping gear.

In 1937–38, Nadakaze was one of the ships that had her hull strengthened, funnel caps added and her fuel capacity reduced to 234 metric tons (230 long tons). In 1940, she was converted into a patrol boat that displaced 1,727 metric tons (1,700 long tons). This entailed the removal of two of her boilers, which cut her horsepower in half and reduced her speed to 20 knots (37 km/h; 23 mph), the removal of two 12 cm guns and two torpedo tube mounts. These were replaced by ten license-built 25 mm (0.98 in) Type 96 light AA guns and 16 depth charges. The following year, the ship was rebuilt as a destroyer transport able to carry two Daihatsu-class landing craft and accommodate 250 troops. To make room for these, her stern was cut down to the waterline for a ramp and her aftmost 12 cm gun, the remaining torpedo tubes and the depth charges were removed.

== Construction and career ==
Nadakaze, built at the Maizuru Naval Arsenal, was laid down on 9 January 1920, launched on 26 June 1920 and completed on 30 September 1921. On commissioning, the ship was assigned to Yokosuka Naval District as part of Destroyer Division 3 under the IJN 2nd Fleet. From 1937 to 1939, Nadakaze was assigned to patrols of the northern and central China coastlines in support of Japanese combat operations in the Second Sino-Japanese War. In December 1938, Destroyer Division 3 was disbanded, and Nadakaze was reassigned to the reserves.

=== As Patrol Boat No.2 ===
In April 1940, after extensive modifications, Nadakaze was returned to active duty as a No.1-class patrol boat, and renamed Patrol Boat No. 2 (第二哨戒艇, Dai-ni Shokaitei). After the start of the Pacific War on 7 December 1941, Patrol Boat No. 2 was assigned to patrols and escort missions in the Philippines, Netherlands East Indies and Solomon Islands. In January 1943, Patrol Boat No. 2 was reassigned to the Japanese home islands, escorting convoys between Moji, Takao, Saigon, Manila and Singapore. In December 1943, the patrol boat became the designated support ship for Imperial Japanese Navy Land Forces based in Balikpapan, Borneo.

On 25 July 1945, Patrol Boat No. 2 was torpedoed and sunk by the Royal Navy submarine HMS Stubborn near Lombok Strait, in the Lesser Sunda Islands, Netherlands East Indies at position 07°06′S 115°42′E. The ship was removed from the Navy List on 30 September 1945.
