= Japanese torpedo boat Tomozuru =

1933 Chidori-class torpedo boat

Coordinates: 28°25′N 124°32′E

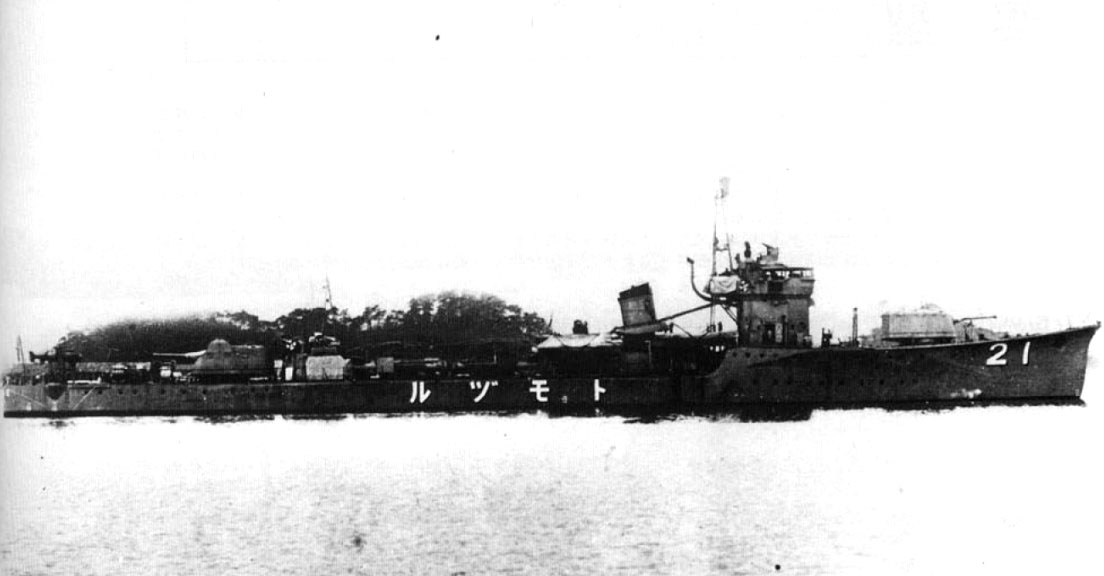
- Tomozuru in 1934

History

Empire of Japan
- Name: Tomozuru
- Builder: Maizuru Naval Arsenal
- Launched: 1 October 1933
- Completed: 24 February 1934
- Fate: Sunk 24 March 1945

General characteristics as built
- Class & type: Chidori-class torpedo boat
- Displacement: 535 long tons (544 t) standard; 737 long tons (749 t) full load
- Length: 82 m (269 ft 0 in)
- Beam: 7.4 m (24 ft 3 in)
- Draught: 2.5 m (8 ft 2 in)
- Speed: 30 knots (35 mph; 56 km/h)
- Complement: 113
- Armament: 1 × 2, 1 × 1 - 127 mm (5.0 in) Type 3 L/50 guns; 1 × 12.7 mm (0.50 in) machine gun; 2 × 2 - 533 mm (21.0 in) torpedo tubes; 8 × 533 mm (21.0 in) torpedoes; 9 × depth charges

General characteristics after rebuilding
- Displacement: 600 long tons (610 t) (standard); 815 long tons (828 t) (full load)
- Draft: 2.38 m (7 ft 10 in)
- Speed: 28.0 knots (32.2 mph; 51.9 km/h)
- Range: 1,600 nmi (3,000 km) at 14 kn (16 mph; 26 km/h)
- Armament: 3 × 1 - 120 mm (4.7 in) Type 11 L/45 guns; 1 × 1 - 13.2 mm (0.52 in) machine gun; 2 × 1 - 533 mm (21.0 in) torpedo tubes; 9 × depth charges

Tomozuru (友鶴) was one of four Chidori-class torpedo boats of the Imperial Japanese Navy (IJN). It capsized in a storm on 12 March 1934, shortly after its completion. This incident forced the IJN to review the stability of all recently completed, under construction and planned ships. It was salvaged and put back into service after extensive modifications. During World War II, the Tomozuru fought in the Battle of the Philippines and in the Dutch East Indies campaign as an escort, and it continued to play that role for the rest of the war.

== The Tomozuru incident ==
In February 1934, Tomozuru joined the 21st Torpedo Flotilla at Sasebo.

- 01:00, 12 March 1934, Tomozuru departed from Sasebo for a night torpedo exercise with the light cruiser Tatsuta and torpedo boat Chidori (千鳥).
- 03:25, because of stormy weather, Tatsuta ordered the other two boats to return to base.
- 03:58, radio contact lost with Tomozuru. Possible loss of power or radio capability.
- 04:12, Tomozuru's lights disappeared, presumably this is when it capsized.
- 14:05, a rescue plane discovered the capsized Tomozuru drifting.
- 07:00, 13 March 1934, Tomozuru was towed by Tatsuta back to Sasebo. 100 crew were lost.

The instability of the Chidoris arose from Japanese efforts to circumvent the various naval treaties. They had designed small vessels of around 600 tons, but with the weaponry of a destroyer of twice the displacement. Weight had been saved by lighter construction but gun systems remained complex and heavy. After the launch of the lead ship, its high centre of gravity - even higher than feared - had been noted and efforts made to remedy this. High-speed sea trials showed it to be unstable, however, and further efforts were made to rectify the problem by adding bulges to the hull. Eventually Chidori satisfied the examiners and it was commissioned and the construction of the class, including Tomozuru, proceeded. At the time of its loss, Tomozuru was low on consumables such as fuel or water that would have ballasted it and lowered its centre of gravity. On the other hand, munitions were fully loaded, so the situation was significantly worse than on its sea trials.

=== Consequences ===
The cause of Tomozuru capsizing was a low metacentric height. The IJN established a committee and inspected the stability of all vessels. As a result of the inspection, the IJN discovered a lack of rolling performance, among others, in the following vessels:

- Aircraft carriers : Ryūjō
- Cruisers : Mogami class
- Destroyers : Fubuki, Akatsuki and Hatsuharu classes
- Submarine tenders : Taigei
- Minelayers : Yaeyama, Shirataka, Itsukushima and the Natsushima and Tsubame classes
- Minesweepers : No.1 and No.13 classes
- Subchasers : No.1 class

The significance of this incident is that it severely challenged Japanese assumptions over the stability of their warships and prompted a major review of the design of all Japanese warships. Existing vessels had their superstructures reduced and ships planned and under construction were redesigned during 1934-35. In particular the Mogami-class cruisers were significantly altered.

== Service ==
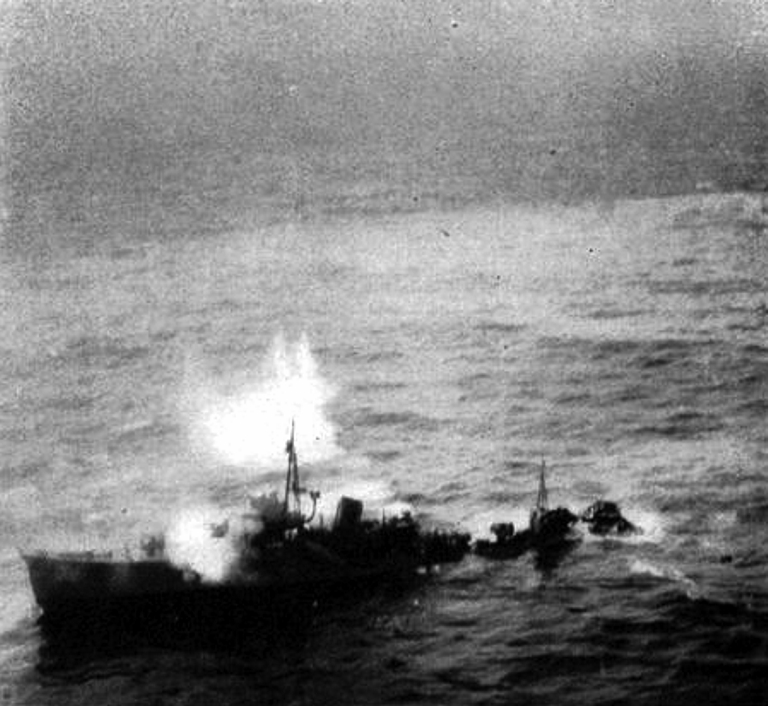
The last moment of Tomozuru in 1945

The ship was later repaired and saw service against China and in World War II. It was part of the naval support force for the invasion of Netherlands New Guinea in April 1942 and was present in the Banda Straits in July 1942.

During the war the rear gun was landed and replaced with Type 96 25mm AA guns. A total of ten of these were carried by the end of the war. The number of depth charges carried was also increased over the course of the war to 48.

Tomozuru was sunk 220 km north-west of Okinawa on 24 March 1945 by U.S. carrier-based aircraft.
