= Battle of Kendari =

1942 battle of the Pacific War (WWII)

- Part of World War II, Pacific War, Dutch East Indies campaign
Date	24 January 1942 (Last guerrilla pocket surrendered on 27 March, 1942)
Location	Kendari, Southeast of Celebes Island 1°9′48″N 124°51′26″E
Result	Japanese victory

Belligerents
Netherlands	Japan

Commanders and leaders
(Netherlands) E.G.T. Anthonio (surrendered) (Netherlands) F.B. van Straalen (surrendered)	(Empire of Japan) Kunizō Mori (Empire of Japan) Takeo Takagi

Strength
400	c. 3,000

Casualties and losses
Unknown; Troops deserted, executed or surrendered later on	4 wounded One cruiser damaged One destroyer damaged

The Battle of Kendari took place on 24 January 1942 as part of the Japanese offensive in the Dutch East Indies. The airfield Kendari II at Kendari became an essential target for Japanese forces for its strategic location and infrastructure quality. Encountering little to no resistance, Japanese troops managed to capture the airfield in one day, as the Dutch defenders were already in retreat inland.

== Background ==
Constructed in 1938, Kendari II Airfield, which was located 27 km from the eponymous city, increased the military significance of the Southeast Celebes Region exponentially. Upon its completion, Kendari II was considered as the best airfield throughout the Dutch East Indies, if not the entire Southeast Asia. The airfield had three runways and additional space for expansion. Before the outbreak of war, Dutch forces had already built barracks that can accommodate 500 troops and planned to expand it more for Australian or KNIL reinforcements.

To bolster its defense, four KNIL brigades (15-18 troops each) garrisoned the airfield, before they were reinforced by additional troops, AA guns, machine guns and mortars from Java. By the end of 1941, Dutch forces strength on the city numbered around 500 troops, of which 320 of them are regular soldiers. By 1942, about 3,000 bombs and a million liters of aircraft fuel had been placed on Kendari II to accommodate American bombers who were using the airfield as a staging base to refuel and rearm in their operations against the southern Philippines.

All the same, the airfield is one of the bases that Japanese forces must capture to establish a solid air support network to successfully occupy Java, along with the ones at southern Sumatra, Kuching, Banjarmasin and Makassar. Its capture would enable Japan to conduct air raids on eastern Java, while maintaining air cover that stretched from Ambon to Kupang and Bali Island, in addition to establishing a new naval base.

== Order of battle ==
=== Japan ===
==== Ground forces ====
- Sasebo Combined Special Landing Force (Commander: Capt. Kunizō Mori)

==== Naval units ====
Eastern Attack Unit (Commander: Rear. Adm. Takeo Takagi):
4th Destroyer Flotilla (Commander: Rear. Adm. Takeo Takagi)	Air Group (2nd Air Unit) (Commander: Cdr. Ruitarō Fujita):	Base Force (1st Base Unit) (Commander: Rear. Adm. Kyūji Kubo):
Support Unit: 5th Cruiser Division (Nachi, Haguro); 6th Destroyer Division (Ikazuchi, Inazuma); 2nd Escort Unit: 2nd Destroyer Squadron (Jintsu); 8th Destroyer Division (Ōshio, Asashio and the Michishio); Transport Unit: Transport ships Nankai Maru, Kinai Maru, Shoka Maru, Koshin Maru and Chowa Maru	11th Seaplane Division (Chitose, Mizuho); Patrol Boat P-34, P-39	1st Base Force (Nagara); 15th Destroyer Division (Natsushio, Kuroshio, Oyashio, Hayashio); 16th Destroyer Division (Yukikaze, Tokitsukaze, Hatsukaze, Amatsukaze); 21st Minesweeper Division; (W-7, W-8, W-9, W-11, W-12): 1st Submarine-chaser Division; (CH-1, CH-2)

=== Netherlands ===
==== Ground forces ====
Commander: Capt. E.G.T. Anthonio
Infantry	Services
Twenty infantry brigades with 6x medium machine guns, 6x 80mm mortars and 4 overvalwagen armored cars.; Seven brigades at Kendari City (under Capt. Anthonio).; Seven brigades at Kendari II Airfield under the command of Captain F.B. Van Straalen.; Four overvalwagen as support.; Six brigades between Kendari II and Kendari City at Mandongan.; (7-km marker between both locations) as reserve under 2nd. Lt. T.E. Aronds.; Coastguards watch, whose personnel are provided by Aronds' brigades.; 2x 40mm AA guns and 3x 12.7mm AA machine guns, manned by 45 troops under Sgt. Maj. G.F.J. Bruijnius.	Airport management and ML-KNIL personnel under Lt. M. Schalen.; Engineers under Reserve 2nd Lt. M.C. Thenu.; Military Medical Service under 1st Class Health Officer M. Waisfisz, 2nd Class W. J. Breslau, B. T. G. de Jong and S. A. van Tijn; ca. 30 medical personnel.

== Dutch plans ==
Dutch plans of defense called for repulsing any landings on the beach, before delaying the enemy advance towards Kendari II and stoutly defend the airfield. The plan arranged for half of the occupying troops would repel the coastal landings near Kendari City, while the other half would defend Kendari II against possible paratrooper attacks. As with other Dutch troops stationed in the Outer Regions (outside Java), the defenders must resort to guerrilla warfare in the case that regular defense could not be conducted anymore. Regardless of the plan, the defensive structure and details had already begun to break down in the periods leading up to the battle.

Even though the troops had been equipped with six machine guns and three Madsen guns, the machine guns had to be allocated to Makassar in January 1942, leaving Anthonio's troops without any automatic weapons to support them. For motorization, even through Dutch troops were provided with 30 trucks, they had to assigned their own troops to drive them, thus reducing their combat capacity. Yet eventually, as these trucks were more often used by Dutch personnel at Kendari II for barracks construction and fuel supplying, the motorization plan falls apart.

To make matters more difficult, Dutch defenders had not come up with demolition plans for the airfield by late December 1941, when the war was in full swing. When Reserve Capt. A.J. Wittich had come up with a feasible plan by late January 1942, shortage of explosives forced Dutch troops to adopt incineration plan for the airfield instead. In overall, Kendari defenders' morale had already been teetering before Japanese forces had even arrived. A NEFIS (Netherlands Forces Intelligence Service) report published after the war remarked that Dutch leadership in Kendari had little confidence that they can adequately defend the airfield, with Anthonio himself stating: "What can we do with 400 men?"

== Japanese plans ==
According to the Japanese plan, the operation to capture Kendari will proceed along the Menado – Kendari – Makassar line that falls under the responsibility of the Imperial Japanese Navy. The plan calls for the landing in Kendari to be conducted 43 days after the general Japanese offensives on 8 December began, which will be on 20 January. The Sasebo Combined Landing Force that took part in the capture of Manado were assigned for this operation. Even though the operations in Tarakan and Manado were completed ahead of schedule, the Dutch East Indies Commander, Vice Adm. Ibo Takahashi postponed the Kendari attack to 24 January due to the delay in the arrival of the Construction Squad and the ongoing operation to clear allied submarines from Molucca Sea. By 21 January, the Sasebo Force and its naval escorts left the Bangka anchorage, heading for Kendari.

== Battle ==
=== Prelude air raids ===
On 12 January a Japanese recon aircraft flew over Kendari II to scout the area. The following day, a C5M plane dropped leaflets over Kendari II, saying that Dutch troops had better surrender, which was followed by raids from nine bombers the day after. On 15 January, Zero fighters from the 3rd Air Group strafed the airfield, but Dutch AA fire damaged one Zero. Even though these raids did little damage to the airfield, it wreak great havoc among Dutch troops' morale. The day after the first bombing raid, the entire Indonesian crew of the AA detachment and several troops deserted, forcing Anthonio to send out two brigades to apprehend them. Furthermore, Dutch troops also had to evacuate women and children to Wawatobi town, 60 km away from Kendari. Despite the actions that have been taken, poor Dutch leadership performance still persists. During the first air raid, Captain Van Straalen immediately ran away at first sign from the air raid siren and only returned 90 minutes after the All-Clear signal have been given.

=== Escape of USS Childs ===
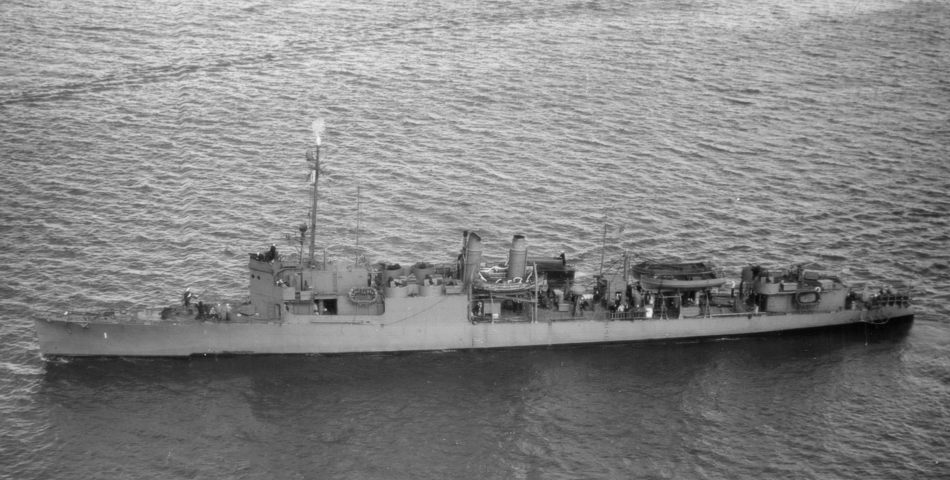
Seaplane tender USS Childs (AVD-1)

When the Japanese invasion fleet was approaching, Staring Bay and Kendari anchorage was already cleared of Allied shipping, except for the American seaplane tender USS Childs, who had arrived on the night of 22 January. Its skipper, Lt. Cdr J. L. "Doc" Pratt, was assigned to send 30,000 gallons of aviation fuel for Kendari II.

To mitigate the risk of Japanese air raids, the ship's hull was painted green and its movement was limited to nighttime sailing only; at day time, Pratt hides the ship in small coves among trees. During the fuel transfer, Childs was tied to some coconut trees to hide itself. Yet the low tide rendered the offloading place dry, leaving the ship nearly tipped over in the mud. At this point, a Japanese scout plane flew overhead and spotted the seaplane tender. It was only because of the green paint and tilted position that Childs was saved from any follow-up attacks.The arrival of the high tide helped repositioned the ship again.

When a schooner was spotted sailing nearby, Pratt was convinced that Japanese forces are monitoring his ship, and got Childs underway at 05:25 on 24 January. But as they were steaming southward, a lookout reported that four Japanese destroyers are heading to intercept them, and that one of them challenged Childs with the signal "A8Y...A8Y...A8Y." Rodney Nordenfelt, the signalman, simply returned the signal back, giving time for Pratt to change course to a narrow channel in full speed under the cover of heavy rain squall.

As the seaplane tender cleared the channel, Pratt noticed that the four destroyers are still pursuing them. Eventually, however, they perceived Childs to be a merchant ship and headed back to the anchorage. Just 30 minutes later, three Japanese fighters were scouting the ship overhead. Its anti-aircraft (AA) defenses immediately open fire and drove them off, only to have the fighters returned again 5 minutes later. This time, the AA fire damaged one of the plane and the fighters retreated. A floatplane appeared at 14:15 and challenged Childs with the "A8Y" signal again. When Childs used the same strategy to deceive it, the plane swiftly dropped two bombs on the ship. Both of them missed and Childs' AA fire forced the floatplane to retreat. Pratt now directed the seaplane tender to steam southeast at full speed to avoid possible encounter with Japanese warships. In two days, Childs managed to reach Soerabaja (Surabaya) safely.

=== Japanese landing ===
At the time of the Japanese landing on 24 January, Dutch troops in Kendari were spread out in this disposition:

- A number of coastguards, including at Sampara
- Two brigades who were tracking down the deserters.
- Four brigades under Capt. Anthonio in Kendari City.
- Three brigades under Lt. Aronds at Mandongan-Lepo Lepo area
- Four brigades (two under Sgt. Maj. Michiel Vellinga and Capt. Van Straalen each) at the Kendari II, supported by anti-aircraft artillery
- Two so-called reserve brigades under Van Straalen (the so-called reserve) near Amboepoea (Ambupua)
- C. 22 men in Mandongan (mostly non-combat personnel).

As Mori's troops landed at 04:28, Dutch commanders were caught off guard and lack of proper communications made it difficult for them to organize any defense at all. Even though Anthonio received scheduled coded telegrams of the Japanese fleet movement, he was utterly taken aback when first informed of the fleet at anchor off Kendari. At 06:00, Van Straalen noticed the sight of Japanese planes and the sound of artillery fires and attempted to contact Anthonio but failed. It was not until non-combat personnel and brigades from Lepo Lepo arrived at Kendari II, that he received reports of Japanese landing near Sampara.

When he received word about the fleet sightings, Anthonio drove to the Kendari coastline, where he personally saw the warships and transport ships, before driving back to Mandongan. There, he organized Aronds' troops around a defensive position, before report of the landing in Sampara made him drove to Kendari City; Anthonio feared that Japanese fighters will strafe him if he head for the airfield instead. At Kendari City, Anthonio divided the garrisoning troops into two groups (ca. 40 soldiers each) and ordered them to march inland. One group under Anthonio's command made its way, while Mori's troops captured the second group and beheaded the two sergeants who were leading it.

After he was informed of Mori's landing, Lt. Aronds left Kendari City for Mandongan and destroyed the Dutch quarters there. Local population then informed the Japanese advance towards the Kendari-Wawotobi road to him, who passed it along to Anthonio. Aronds was then ordered to inform Kendari II of the situation and began the destruction task at once. Anthonio finally ordered Aronds and his 15 soldiers to defend against the Japanese advance at the 7-km marker. Aronds tried to contact the three brigades at the Mandongan - Lepo Lepo area to join him, but they could not be reached. He eventually had to defend the marker alone.

At the airfield, the destruction efforts began under much confusion around 12:00. Lt. Schalen, assisted by the AA crews, destroyed the warehouses, radio station, diesel installations, AA guns and transport vehicles. The aircraft bomb dumps could not be destroyed, though, as they do not have the explosives to do so. Half an hour later, Van Straalen and his brigades retreated inland, leaving two brigades under Sgt. G.J. van Duuren and Sgt. Maj. Vellinga to engage the Sasebo Force as they entered the airfield. By 17:00, Mori's troops managed to occupy and secure Kendari II. At 03:05 the following day, Mori reported: "[The airfield is] right away available for 30 fighter planes. [The condition of] the airfield is quite good and it can be used even by medium-sized land-based attack planes without problem."

Within hours, 25 Mitsubishi Zero and five Mitsubishi C5M from the 1st Air Raid Group staged into the airfield, followed by the 21st Air Flotilla Headquarters and 27 bombers of the Kanoya Air Group. Between 27 January and 6 February, 19 Zeros and nine dive bombers from the 2nd Air Group arrived as reinforcements.

=== Collision between Nagara and Hatsuharu ===
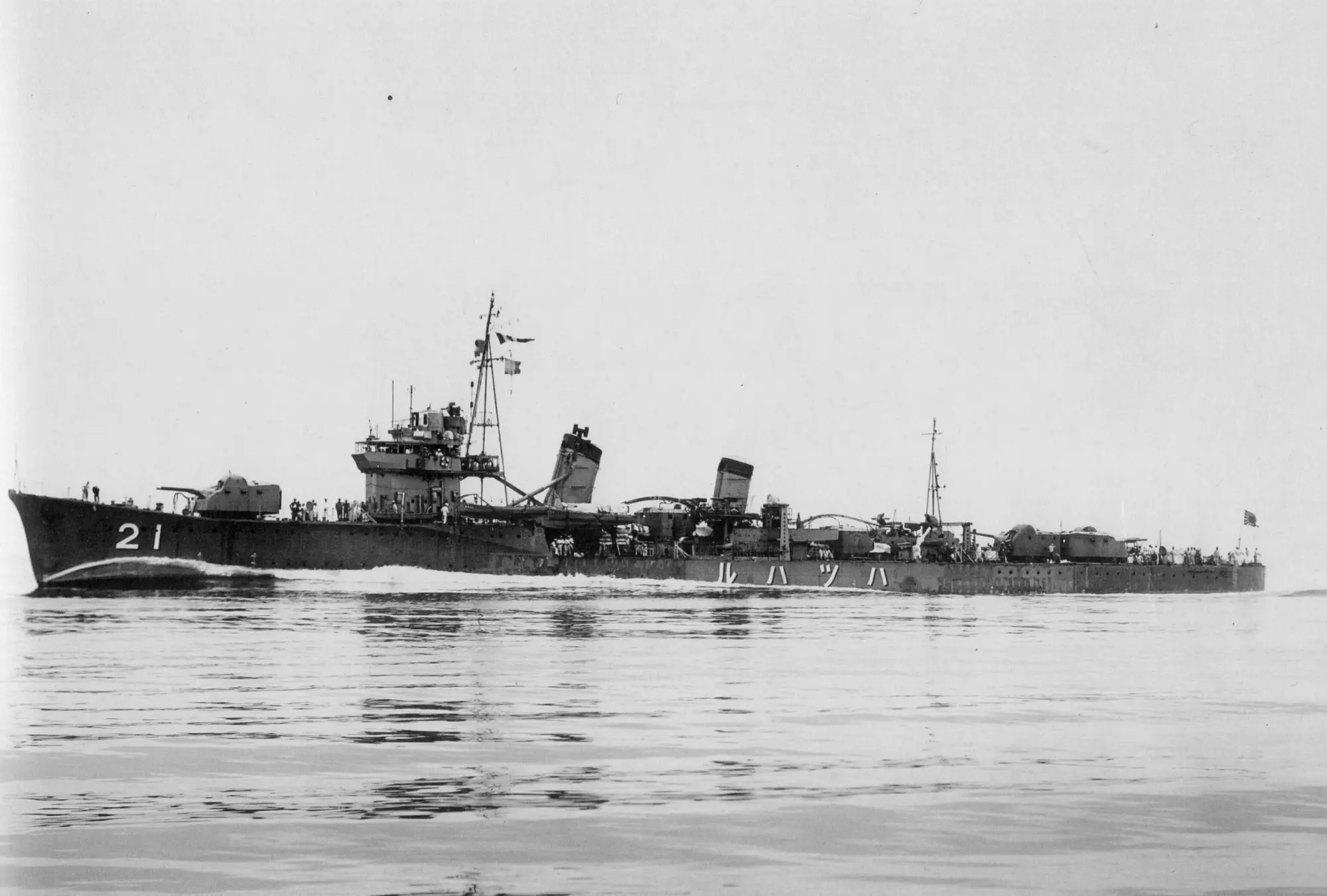
Japanese destroyer Hatsuharu

On the morning of 25 January, destroyers of the 21st Destroyer Division (Hatsuharu, Hatsushimo, Nenohi, Wakaba) headed towards Kendari to reinforce the 1st Base Unit. Visibility was very limited due to the intense rain, resulting in the destroyer Hatsuharu to collide with 1st Base Force commander's flagship, Nagara while steaming at a high speed of 21 knots. As the result, Nagara's starboard side and upper structures was damaged, while Hatsuharu's bow up to the turret and fore gun was crushed.

Because of the accident, Adm. Kubo had to transfer his command to the destroyer Hatsushimo, while Nagara sailed on its own to Davao for repairs. Escorted by Nenohi and Wakaba, Hatsuharu also sailed for Davao for repairs, leaving the reinforcement for 1st Base Force reduced considerably. The accident strained the operational capacity of the Eastern Attack Unit, who was facing a shortage of smaller vessels. Adm. Takagi subsequently delayed the 16th Destroyer Division's return to Bangka anchorage to prepare for the Ambon operation by one day.

=== Retreat inland ===
After the capture of Kendari II, Dutch troops went in a headlong retreat to Tawanga town on the Koneweha River, where from there they would begin the guerrilla fight. Capt. Anthonio and his group went west to make a shortcut to Ambekari (Ambekairi). Lt. Aronds' group, which was down to just 4 (including himself), had joined forces with Anthonio near Mandiodo, a coastal village northwest of Kendari City. Still, this new group ended up aimlessly wandering through Central Celebes before eventually arriving at Enrekang in Southern Celebes on 8 March.

Meanwhile, Capt. Van Straalen's Group headed for Mawila, east of Kendari II after leaving the airfield. Along the way, he split the group, ordering Sgt. Maj. J.C.W. van Ploeg to take command of the second one and marched them to Tawanga via Ammoesoe (Amesiu). Van Straalen, on the other hand, went to Motaha, where he joined forces with the two brigades who were tracking down the deserters. The combined group arrived at Tawanga on 31 January and began to set up their base, including a radio station at Sanggona. Two days later, Ploeg's group reported in with 20 troops.

The troops on Kendari II (divided under Schalen, Vellinga and Bruijnius) headed southward, not knowing of the rendezvous point at Tawanga. Schalen marched for 8 to 10 days before finally reaching Tawanga on 14 February. Bruijnius' group (33 soldiers) ended up south of the Boroboro Mountains on the first week of February. Unsure about where the assembly base actually was, he decided to leave Celebes and managed to reached Timor. Part of the group (machine-gunners) were garrisoned at Koepang (Kupang), while the other part (AA gunners) left for Java. Vellinga's group encountered Japanese forces en route to Tawanga, where he and several others died in the ensuing firefight.

=== Guerrilla war ===
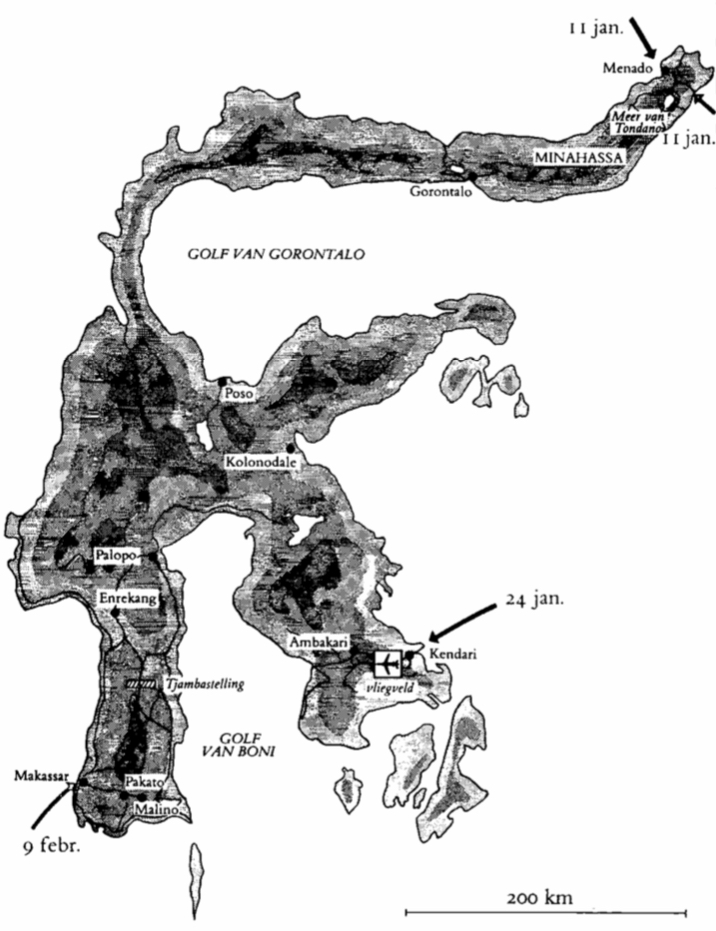
Japanese attack on Celebes, January–February 1942

At the start of the guerrilla campaign, Capt. Van Straalen had about 250 people (100 of them infantry) under him in Tawanga. He divided the infantry into six brigades and deployed them in a defensive formation, with three placed just south of Asenoea (Asinua), two in Tawanga and one east of Tawanga. Since Capt. Wittich had more knowledge of the region, Van Straalen appoint him to command the six brigades. Incessant Japanese air raids eventually forced Van Straalen to move the guerrilla base 16 km west to Paraboea (Parabua).

Despite the substantial composition of troops, Dutch forces took little guerrilla actions in the region. Between 7-8 February, a group under Ploeg engaged Japanese forces in Asanoea, pushing a patrol back on the 7th and destroyed a bridge. When Japanese marines advanced on the village again, Ploeg's troops ambushed them and forced them to retreat. The action cost Ploeg 8 casualties. In mid-February, Sgt. A.D. Voomeman's group drove off Japanese troops in a firefight at Ambekari; on 22 February, 30 Japanese troops were killed in an ambush near Aimendi.

As the possibility of Japanese troops learning about the Dutch guerrilla base become more likely, Van Straalen received a radio message on 26 February from Marinus Vooren, commander of all Dutch troops in Celebes. Vooren ordered him to join with the rest of the Dutch troops that were still holding out in Southwest Celebes; 14 days earlier, Van Straalen had already sent the non-combatants under Health Officer Waisfisz to join Dutch forces under Vooren. On 1 March, Van Straalen and his whole group started making their way through the Mekongga Mountains, reaching the coastal village of Loho Loho after over seven days. They hired ten boats and went on a four day crossing across the Gulf of Boni. With about 100 people, Van Straalen arrived in Palopo on 17 March, only to learn that Vooren had already surrendered ten days ago. His group made their way to Enrekang and report to Lt. Col. A.L. Gortmans, who was still holding out and refused to surrender.

10 days later, after being persuaded by fellow Dutch commanders, including Vooren, Gortmans surrendered to the Japanese, ending all organized Dutch resistance on Southwest Celebes.

== Aftermath ==
Throughout the attack on Kendari, Japanese forces casualties amount to only four wounded (two during the attack, two from the collision accident between Hatsuharu and Nagara). By 26 January, Chitose and the 16th Destroyer Division had left Kendari, followed by the Sasebo Force and the 15th Destroyer Division on the 27th, 21st Mizuho and the Minesweeper Division on the 29th and the rest of the force on the 30th to prepare for the attack on Ambon and Makassar. A company of Sasebo Force's 2nd Battalion remained at Kendari as an occupation force.

In overall, a lack of firm leadership and organization from Anthonio and Van Straalen played a significant role in the swift Japanese victory at Kendari. The guerrilla campaign that followed afterwards yield little results due to the absence of local population support that stems from fear of the Japanese and their disregard for Dutch troops. Among the locals, they said of the Dutch military: "Kompeni tida lakoe, Marine tida berani." ("The army doesn't know what its doing, the navy has no courage.")
