= Battle of Manado =

1942 WWII battle of the Dutch East Indies Campaign

Coordinates: 1°9′48″N 124°51′26″E

- Part of World War II, Pacific War, Dutch East Indies campaign
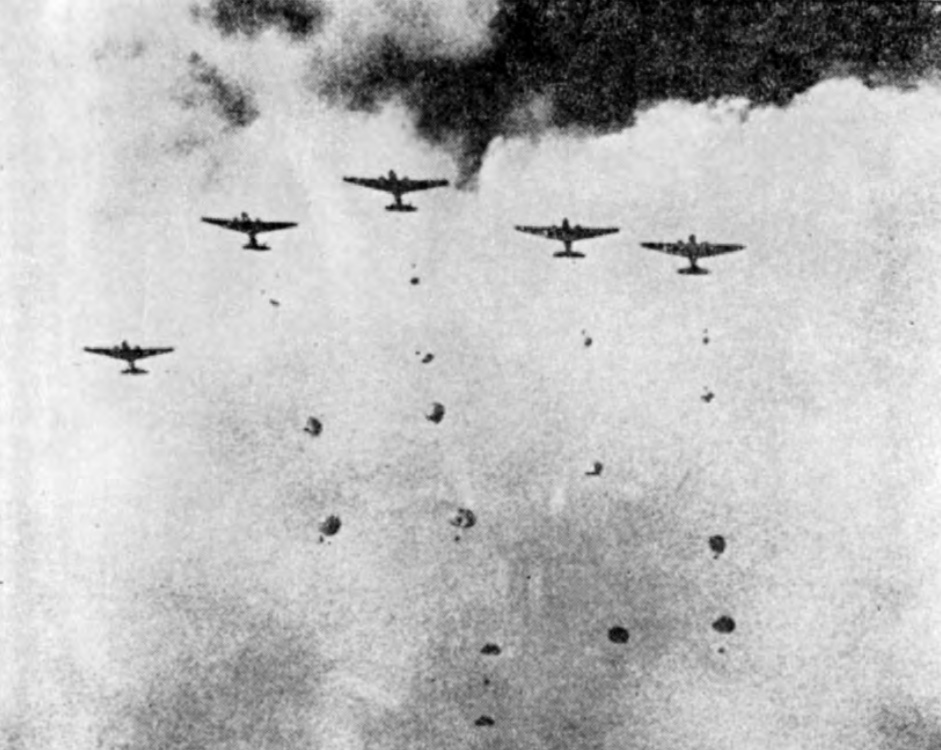
- Japanese paratroopers dropping over Langoan Airfield.
Date	11–12 January 1942 (Last guerrilla pocket captured 9 August 1942)
Location	Manado, Celebes Island
Result	Japanese victory

Belligerents
Netherlands	Japan

Commanders and leaders
(Dutch government-in-exile) B.F.A. Schilmöller (surrendered 23 March)	(Empire of Japan) Raizō Tanaka (Empire of Japan) Kunizō Mori (Empire of Japan) Toyoaki Horiuchi

Strength
1,500 infantry	3,200 naval infantry 507 paratroopers

Casualties and losses
140 killed 48 captured	44 killed 244 wounded

The Battle of Manado took place as part of the Japanese offensive to capture the Dutch East Indies. It occurred at Manado (also spelled Menado) on the Minahasa Peninsula on the northern part of Celebes Island (modern day Sulawesi in Indonesia), from 11–12 January 1942. The battle was noted as the first time in Japanese history that the country had deployed paratroopers in a military operation.

== Background ==
=== Minahasa's strategic value ===
Even though the Minahasa Peninsula did not contain any raw materials or strategic technical installations, its military value remained essential. The sheltered bays of Manado and Lake Tondano provided good bases for seaplanes, and Dutch forces had established a naval base on the southeast side of Tondano Lake, near Tasoeka (Tasuka). A seaplane base was also established on the southern part of the Lake, near Kakas.

Aside from that, Dutch forces also constructed two airfields nearby. At the Kalawiran village near Langoan, the Menado II/Langoan Airfield was established. When the war broke out, Manado I Airfield, located just east of Manado City at Mapanget, was still under construction.

=== Japanese invasion plan ===
As part of Japan's plan to conquer the Netherlands East Indies, particularly the island of Java, air support from southern Sumatra, Kuching, Banjarmasin (south-eastern part of Dutch Borneo), Makassar and Kendari (both on southern Celebes) was required. Beforehand, however, in order to set up the aforementioned aerial support, specifically in southern Celebes and Banjarmasin, relay fields in Manado, Tarakan and Balikpapan had to be conquered as well.

The seizure of Manado was part of Japan's Eastern Offensive prong to capture the Dutch East Indies. Responsibility for conducting attacks on this prong fell to the Imperial Japanese Navy.

== Order of battle ==
=== Japan ===
==== Ground forces ====
Sasebo Combined Special Landing Force (Commander: Capt. Kunizō Mori):	1st Yokosuka Special Naval Landing Force (Commander: Cdr. Toyoaki Horiuchi):
1st Sasebo Combined Special Landing Force of 1,800 naval infantry under Capt. Kunizō Mori; 2nd Sasebo Combined Special Landing Force of 1,400 naval infantry under Cdr. Uroku Hashimoto	1st Drop Group of 334 paratroopers; 2nd Drop Group of 173 paratroopers; Kema Landing Group of 169 men; Tondano Lake Landing Group of 22 men; Menado Landing Group of 64 men

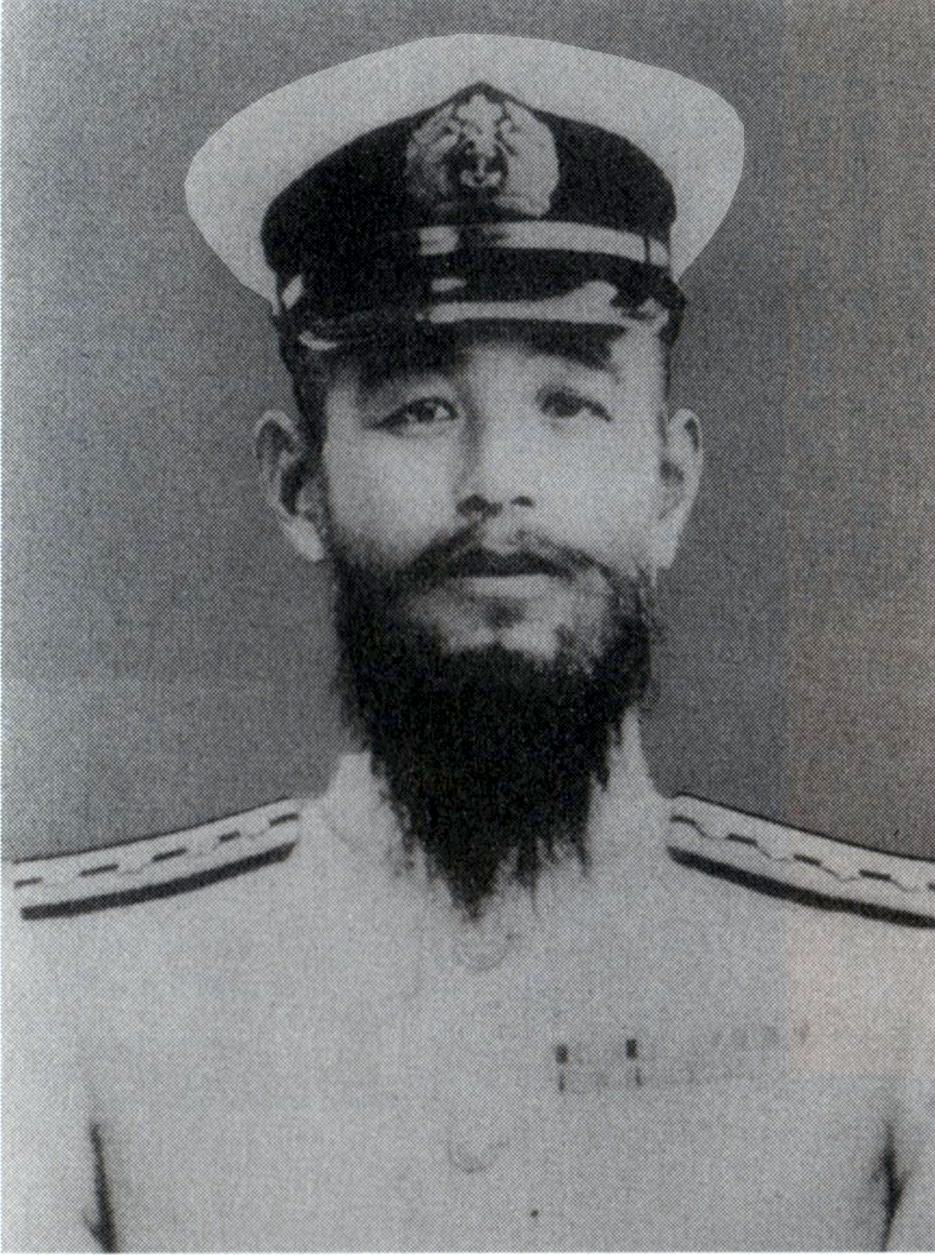
Commander Toyoaki Horiuchi.

==== Naval units ====
Eastern Attack Unit (Commander: Rear. Adm. Takeo Takagi - delegated command during Battle of Manado to Rear Adm. Raizō Tanaka):
2nd Destroyer Flotilla (Commander: Rear. Adm. Takeo Takagi):	Air Group (2nd Air Unit) (Commander: Cdr. Ruitarō Fujita):	Base Force (1st Base Unit) (Commander: Rear. Adm. Kyūji Kubo):
Support Unit: 5th Cruiser Division (Nachi, Haguro); 6th Destroyer Division (Ikazuchi, Inazuma); 2nd Escort Unit: 2nd Destroyer Squadron (Jintsu); 15th Destroyer Division (Natsushio, Kuroshio, Oyashio, Hayashio); 16th Destroyer Division (Yukikaze, Tokitsukaze, Hatsukaze, Amatsukaze); Transport Unit: 1st Echelon: Oha Maru, Shinko Maru, Shoka Maru, Koshin Maru, Chowa Maru; 2nd Echelon: Nankai Maru, Kinai Maru, Hokuroku Maru, Amagisan Maru, Katsuragi Maru	11th Seaplane Division (Chitose, Mizuho); Patrol Boat P-39	1st Base Force (Nagara); Patrol boats P-1, P-2, P-34; 21st Minesweeper Division; (W-7, W-8, W-9, W-11, W-12): 1st Submarine-chaser Division; (CH-1, CH-2, CH-3)

=== Netherlands ===
==== Ground forces ====
Troepencommando Menado (Commander: Maj. B.F.A. "Ben" Schillmöller with staff under 1st Lt. M. Siegmund):
Infantry	Artillery
Compagnie Menado of 188 Manadonese troops (with one 12.7 mm machine gun and Madsen machine guns) under Capt. W.F.J. Kroon.; Mobiele Colonne of three brigades (45 troops) under Sgt-Maj. A.J. ter Voert; to be used against Japanese paratroopers.; Reserve Korps Oud Militairen (RK) of 500 troops under Captain W.C. van den Berg. This unit consist of five companies with eight brigades (15-18 retired KNIL personnel per brigade): A Company (eight brigades) under 1st Lt. A.O. Radema; B Company (eight brigades) under 1st Lt. W.G. van de Laar; C Company (eight brigades) under 1st Lt. H. Fuchter; D Company (eight brigades) under 1st Lt. J.B. Wielinga; E Detachment (three brigades) under Sgt. Meliëzer; Kort Verband Compagnie (KV) of nine brigades under Capt. J.D.W.T. Abbink.; Europese Militie en Landstorm Compagnie (European Militia) of ca. 100 troops under 1st Lt. F. Masselink.; Menadonese Militie Compagnie (Native Militia); about 400 Manadonese militias under Capt. J.H.A.L.C. de Swert.; Stadswacht Menado (Home Guard) of 100 troops (armed with old hunting rifles) under 1st Lt. M.A. Nolthenius de Man.	One or two 75 mm field guns (L.35 Model 1902); Three truck-mounted 37 mm guns to defend the Tasoeka Naval Base at Lake Tondano

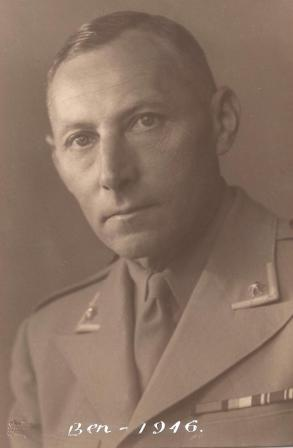
Major B.F.A. "Ben" Schillmöller.

== Dutch plans ==
The Dutch defense plan for Manado consisted of:

- Defend against a coup de main (sudden attack) by the Japanese force
- Put up a stiff resistance against the enemy landing. If the fight led to the destruction of most of the troops, proceed to conduct a guerrilla fight
- Defend the Tasoeka naval airbase and Langoan airfield
- Monitor a northern landing area west of the Ajermadidih (Airmadidi)-Tateloe (Tatelu) road

Between May 1940 and December 1941, the Dutch forces in Manado made necessary defense preparation. These preparations consisted of establishing several monitoring services (coast guards, airport surveillance as well as other vital objects), to which 2 Reserve Corps (RK) companies were assigned to conduct these services. In addition, the Dutch also worked to construct several defensive positions. However, due to limited funding, few of these positions were completed by the time the Pacific war broke out.

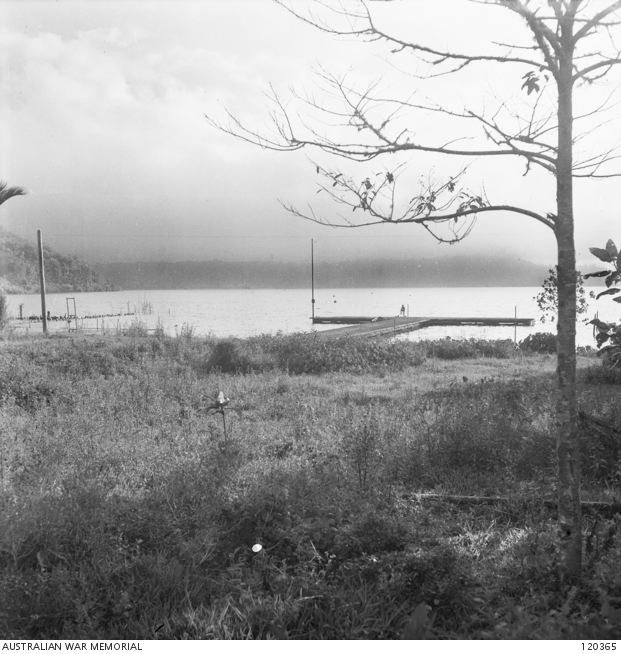
Kakas Seaplane Base in 1945, when Manado was liberated from Japanese occupation by the Menado Force.

By 8 December 1941, Schillmöller arranged his troops to be stationed in these positions:

- Combined Force of Compagnie Menado, Stadswacht Menado and Landstorm Compagnie, one machine gun section and one 75 mm field gun based in Manado. If the Force failed to defend against the enemy landing on the beach, they had to delay their advance from Manado to Tomohon via the defense preparations in Tinoor and Kakaskasen
- A brigade of Radema's A Company stationed at Ajermadidih, with another two brigades stationed at Kema.
- A Mobile Colonne of 6 trucks mounted with the three 37 mm guns and 4 RK brigades in Poso stationed to defend Lake Tondano
- An RK brigade at Tasoeka Naval Base
- An RK brigade, Command of the defense of Lake Tondano and Langoan Airfield stationed at Kakas Seaplane Base
- Three RK brigades and an overvalwagen at Langoan Airfield
- A section of the KV Company stationed in Kakas stationed as reserve
- KV Company (min. 1 section) stationed in Langoan as reserve
- Staff of Schillmöller's Command with an RK company based in Tomohon

For the defense of Langoan airfield and Kakas Seaplane Base, Schillmöller established the Tactical Command Kakas, under the command of Captain W.C. van den Berg. Van den Berg had the available forces at his disposal:

- Command Post at Kakas
- Airfield defense by Reserve Korp D-Company under 1st. Lt. J.B. Wielinga:
  - 1,5 brigade of C-Company as reserve under Wielinga, stationed at his command post in Langoan village
  - 3,5 brigades of C-Company and the overvalwagen were stationed at Langoan airfield under Sgt-Maj. H.J. Robbemond
- Seaplane base defense by six brigades of Reserve Korps' C-Company (ca. 150 troops) under 1st. Lt. H. Fuchter, supported by the Mobile Colonne
- Two overvalwagens under of Sgt.-Maj. A.J. ter Voert placed as reserve in Kakas

Finally, to accommodate the guerrilla plan, nine underground warehouses were built to store supplies that would be needed during the action. The remaining Dutch troops were divided into six sections, where each was assigned to a specific warehouse. The sections were:

1. Compagnie Menado with European Militia
2. KV Company with E-Company RK
3. A company RK
4. B-company RK
5. C-company RK.
6. D-company RK.

== Japanese plans ==
The Eastern Attack Unit was assigned as the Japanese fleet tasked with capturing Menado. Even though Rear-Adm. Takeo Takagi commanded this force, he left the operation details to Rear-Adm. Raizō Tanaka. The battle plan was intended for the Sasebo Combined Landing Force, as well as the Yokosuka 1st Special Naval Landing Force as a paratrooper unit.

=== Sasebo Combined Special Landing Force ===
The Sasebo Combined Special Landing Force's mission for the upcoming battle consisted of:

- Landing at both coasts on the north and south of Manado, envelop the Dutch forces in the town and destroy them, after which they shall leave Menado and advance towards the Kakas Base via Tomohon
- Landing at Kema and advance towards Tondano lake and Kakas airfield via Ajermadidih
- Together with the 1st Yokosuka Special Landing Force, which shall drop on the airfield, make a pincer attack on the Dutch forces in the airfield from the east and the west
- After destroying the Dutch forces in these areas, they shall reassemble in Manado, and prepare for the coming operation to seize Kendari

The Sasebo Force would depart Davao on 9 January, and the land in the early hours of the 11th.

=== 1st Yokosuka Special Naval Landing Force (SNLF) ===
The 1st Yokosuka SNLF (under Commander Toyoaki Horiuchi), in conjunction with the Sasebo Force, would carry out a paradrop operation on the enemy airfield at 09:30 A.M. on 11 January with the support of the fighters of the 1st Air Raid Unit. Their objectives were to seize Langoan airfield and the Kakas Seaplane Base, two facilities that would support subsequent Japanese operations for the Dutch East Indies campaign.

The distribution of tasks and actions of each unit, were:

Distribution	No. of personnel	Mission
1st Drop Group	334 paratroopers (incl. 58 HQ and Signal Unit members)	Carry out a paradrop on the Langoan airfield on 11 January. Afterwards, the group would be split into two forces: 1. 1st Company (139 paratroopers) would capture the airfield.; 2. The 2nd Company and the rest of the force would seize the Kakas seaplane base.
2nd Drop Group	173 paratroopers	Carry out a paradrop on the Langoan airfield on 12 January.
Kema Unit	169 soldiers	Leave Davao on the Katsuragi Maru on 6 January. Upon landing in Kema, they would transport war supplies, before joining the main body.
Tondano Lake Unit	22 soldiers (incl. 10 Anti-tank gun unit members)	Leave Davao on 11 January on Kawanishi H6K "Mavis" flying boats. On landing in Lake Tondano, they would join the main body and receive orders.
Menado Unit	64 soldiers	Leave Davao as separately designated, and transport war supplies. Afterwards, they would join the main body and receive orders.

The Mitsubishi G3M transport aircraft of the 1st Yokosuka SNLF would fly with an interval of 1,500 m (4,900 ft) between each company. Carrying 12 paratroopers and seven cargo containers each, 10 planes would carry the 1st Drop Group, while eight would carry the 2nd Group. The drops would occur at an altitude of 500 ft (150 m) and at a speed of 100 kn (120 mph; 190 km/h).

== The battle ==
=== Landing on Manado (1st Force) ===
Following the sighting of Japanese transport ships on 10 January, Schillmöller immediately garrisoned the troops in their quarters as planned. He also ordered Capt. Kroon's Combined Force (ca. 400 troops in total) to occupy the Manado coastlines and guard it against possible landings. On Kroon's left flank, in the Sario District, he placed Masselink's European Militia, while Lt. de Man's Stadswacht dug in on the right. Engineers were placed on standby, waiting for the order to destroy vital installations; NCOs and members of local government were also informed of the looming Japanese landing.

Mori's 1st Sasebo Force landed on the northern and southern coast of Manado at 04:00 A.M on 11 January. Upon hearing reports about the landing, Kroon's Compagnie Menado immediately withdrew to the rear positions at Pineleng and Tinoör, without knowing what was happening on the beach, as Mori's troops overran the 75 mm gun that was firing at the landing boats. Yet they also ran into stout opposition from Masselink's militias, forcing them to bring all their automatic fire to bear. Japanese pressure forced Masselink to withdraw to Pineleng, only to find that the 1st Force had bypassed them into the town at 05:00, pressing him to move further southward.

When Kroon's troops arrived half an hour later, Mori's troops forced him to withdraw southward along the Manado-Tomohon road to Roeroekan (Rurukan). When Masselink reported his positions to Schillmöller, he ordered him occupy the bridge at Pineleng instead, even though Japanese troops had already occupied it. Masselink eventually continued the retreat, reaching Tinoör by 07:00. After battling the Combined Force, Mori's 1st Force occupied Manado by 08:30. As reports of the landing began to come in, Schillmöller sent five RK brigades under Lt. van de Laar in Tomohon to Tinoör to support the retreating Combined Force. Immediately after capturing Manado, Mori advanced southward to Tomohon at 09:45, bypassing the Dutch line of retreat.

Soon, Schillmöller pulled three brigades from van de Laar's force back to Tomohon to reinforce the town, prompted by a false report of a Japanese landing in Tanahwangko, further west of Manado. Despite this withdrawal, van de Laar was reinforced by stragglers from Compagnie Menado and an overvalwagen as well as Stadswacht troops under Lt. de Man. To provide protection against Japanese tanks, Dutch troops swiftly cut down a heavy tree that would fall on the road the moment the tanks came. As Mori's vanguard of four Type 95 tanks approached the town at 10:30, the falling tree and concentrated machine gun fire knocked out three of them and repelled Mori's troops. van de Laar's troops held on to Tinoor until about noon, when the shortage of ammunition forced them back to Kakaskasen.

Now supported by overvalwagens, van de Laar set up a new defensive position just north of Kakaskasen. 1st Force engaged them again at 16:00, but Dutch troops managed to stem their advance and caused substantial casualties before retreating again. Yet, since Mori continued to bypass them, once the Dutch arrived in Tomohon, they found themselves immediately fighting the 1st Force. The Combined Force attempted a defense against the Japanese advance, but they could not stop Mori from seizing Tomohon by 19:30. van de Laar's troops moved eastwards to Roeroekan, arriving at 22:00. By morning of the 12th, Mori advanced to Langoan Airfield by way of Tomohon to Kawangkoan. By 12:30, his troops established contact with the 1st Yokosuka paratroopers and arrived at Langoan and Kakas at 14:00. Dutch forces had, by then, retreated to Amoerang (Amurang) further west, while blowing up bridges and warehouses, making no attempts of counterattack in the meantime.

=== Landing on Kema (2nd Force) ===
Lt. Radema's A Company, tasked with defending the eastern coast, was spread along the road between the coastal cities of Kema and Ajermadidih. In addition to the brigades at both aforementioned cities, three brigades were stationed at Mapanget Airfield, and one brigade each was stationed in Likoepang and Bitoeng, further north from Kema. Radema also constructed machine gun casemates and tank barricades along the road from Kema to Ajermadidih.

At the same time as the 1st Force landing, Commander Uroku Hashimoto's 2nd Sasebo Force landed at Kema on the east at 04:20 and engaged Radema's two brigades. When notified about the Landing, Radema ordered the dispersed A-Company to gather at Ajermadidih, but only the troops from Likoepang eventually came. Meanwhile at Kema, the two brigades under Sgt. Soenda retreated after destroying the town bridge; Hashimoto, sparing no time, continued to advance to Ajermadidih. Near Kasar the brigades clashed with the 2nd Force and had to withdraw again after inflicting modest casualties.

By 09:00, the 2nd Force, supported by three Type 95 tanks, advanced to the east of Ajermadidih and engaged Radema's Company, now reinforced with its remaining brigades (ca. 300 troops). Even though Radema's troops managed to cause considerable casualties, Japanese tanks eventually broke through and threatened to outflank the Dutch defense, forcing Radema to retreat by 14:00. To cover their withdrawal, Sgt. Roemambi and Pvt. Iniray and Poesoeng continued to fire from their casemate until it was destroyed by tank shells.

Another cover force of a brigade under Sgt. Sigar held Hashimoto's troops at Sawangan to allow Radema safe passage to Tondano. After driving Sigar's brigade back through force majeure and airplane attacks, an element of the 2nd Force reached Tondano by 18:00, and by 22:00, Hashimoto had reached the town and halted there for the night. By morning on the 12th, Hashimoto went along the roads on the eastern and western shores of lake Tondano, linking up with the 1st Yokosuka paratroopers by 11:00 and the 1st Sasebo Force at 12:30. By the night of the 11th, however, Schillmöller had decided to withdraw to the west and commence a guerilla fight.

Radema left with about 12 troops to the warehouse allocated for his company, but soldiers began to desert along the way. When he arrived at the shelter, it had already been looted by the local population, forcing him to try to infiltrate Ajermadidih to gather what was left of his forces. The rest of his troops eventually abandoned him as well during the journey. The high rate of desertion was exacerbated by the fact that the Japanese had taken all major cities and towns – and with it, the women and children – within 24 hours. In addition, Japanese forces also dropped pamphlets that read: "The war is not taking place against you, only against the Dutch. So be sensible, don't interfere and go home."

=== Airborne drop ===
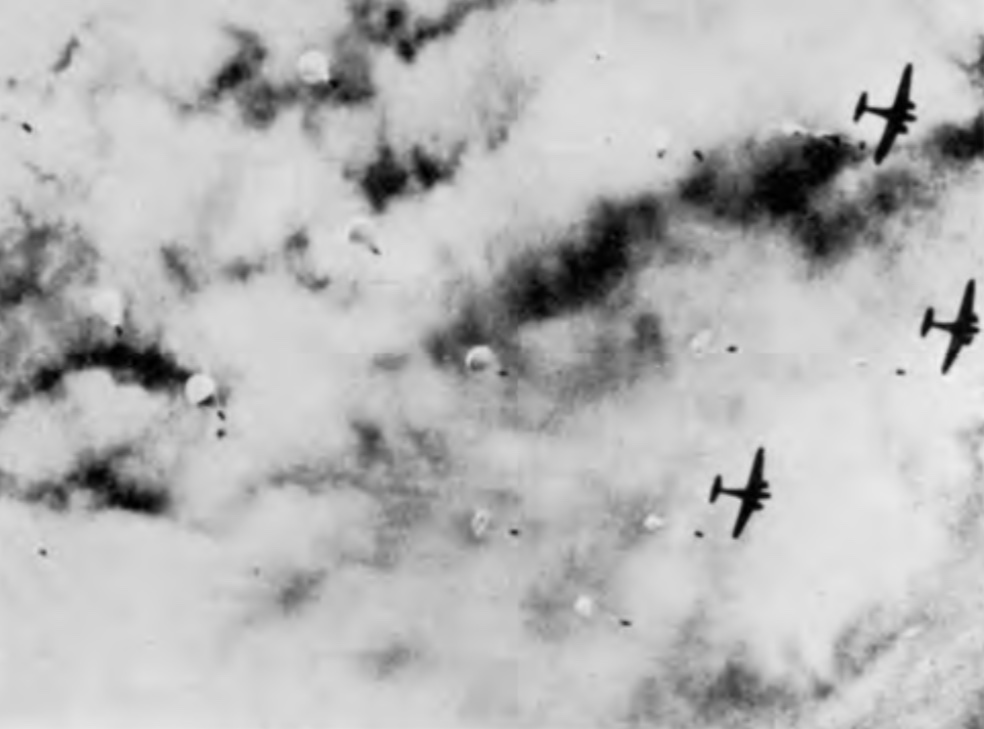
A wave of the 1st Yokosuka Force paratroopers dropping over Langoan Airfield.

On the night of 10–11 January, the Kakas Command Post was alerted by Tomohon, compelling van den Berg to send motorcycle messengers to place his troops on high alert. When Tomohon informed him again at 05:00 of the Japanese landing in Manado and Kema, a brigade from the reserve KV section at Kakas moved to Papakelan to close the roads leading to Tondano.

Concurrently, at 06:30 A.M. on 11 January, 28 Mitsubishi G3M left Davao for Manado, carrying the 1st Drop Group with them. While the flight approached northern Celebes, a group of Mitsubishi F1M "Pete" that was covering the naval invasion force mistakenly attacked them, shooting down a G3M and killing all 12 paratroopers aboard. To prevent further friendly fire incident, Mitsubishi Zero fighters from the carrier Zuiho escorted the flight until it reached the drop zone. In due course, the 1st Group began dropping over Langoan at 09:52 and completed the drop by 10:20. Van den Berg immediately ordered the rest of the reserve KV section to take position west of Kakas to defend against another possible landing. He wanted to call in the reserve KV section in Langoan as well, but Schillmöller had already used them.

Robbemond's troops, though lacking in anti-aircraft guns, used their Vickers and Madsen machine guns to open fire into the paratroopers and repel the oncoming assault. Several paratroopers were dropped close to Dutch pillboxes, and they had to destroy them with pistols and hand grenades, while giving time for the rest of the group to gather weapons from the cargo container.

Upon retrieving their weapons, Horiuchi focused the attack against Robbemond's troops on the northern side of the airfield. By 10:50, the paratroopers had enveloped the northern side, capturing the overvalwagen with it. Schillmöller then put in the reserve KV Company section in Kakas into the battle. The Company was ordered to advance to Toelian and reinforce Van den Berg's troops at the airfield. However the order was not carried out, as the unit disappeared with no further notification. Van den Berg then ordered the two overvalwagens on reserve under ter Voert to attack the airfield. Entering the vicinity of Langoan under heavy fire, one overvalwagen had its engine shot off. Its gunners, Pvt. Tauran and Pvt. Toemoedi kept firing their machine guns to provide cover for rest of the crew, before retreating in the face of the advancing paratroopers. The second one, under Sgt. Bojoh, entered the airfield and took part in the battle before eventually withdrawing.

1st Yokosuka Force paratroopers dropping over Langoan Airfield.

In spite of the dogged resistance, the 1st Drop Group overran the airfield by 11:25. As the battle progresses, Van den Berg called Lt. Fuchter's Company, along with the Mobile Colonne to attack the paratroopers from a westerly direction, via Panasen. Yet Fuchter did not arrive at Kakas until 11:30, where by then Langoan Airfield had already been lost, thus cancelling the attack. Van den Berg then ordered Fuchter's Company and the Mobile Colonne to take position to the south and west of Kakas and relieve the Militia-Landstorm Company stationed there. Upon accessing the number of casualties sustained and the very few troops that were still able to fight, van den Berg's troops destroyed the Tasoeka Naval Base and prepare his troops to move into their assigned guerrilla territory.

At 12:35 van den Berg informed Tomohon that he was leaving for the area east of Tasoeka. He sent the Militia-Landstorm Company – deemed unfit for a guerrilla fight – westwards to Kotamobagoe (Kotamobagu) to join forces with the Manado Militia Company. Lt. Wielinga, the overall commander of the airfield defense, did not use his brigade to support the battle, and had already retreated during the battle instead.

Upon capturing the airfield, Horiuchi sent a reconnaissance team moved to the Kakas area at 13:00 to reconnoiter Dutch movement. Ter Voert, Tauran and Toemoedi who just reached Kakas on foot immediately reported the movement. The team encountered and captured an overvalwagen before moving into Kakas, where they engaged another overvalwagen and forced it to withdraw. 1st and 2nd Company, advancing towards Kakas, engaged with Fuchter's Company, which was supported by an overvalwagen. After an extensive fight, the paratroopers drove Fuchter's troops off and seized Kakas by 14:50. At 15:50 the paratroopers attacked the seaplane base and captured it by 18:00. The attack was supported by the Tondano Lake Unit, who landed by two Mavis flying boats on Tondano Lake at 14:57. While landing, the Unit came under fire from Mobile Colonne's 37 mm guns, which was not sufficient to halt the process.

The following day, the 2nd Drop Group parachuted into Langoan airfield at 09:52 A.M. and linked up with the 1st Drop Group. Horiuchi's force, in full capacity, launched an assault on Langoan city and the neighboring Tompaso. By then, Schillmöller had withdrawn westward, towards Amoerang (Amurang), leaving behind large amounts of weapon and ammunition. Langoan was captured by 11:25, with Tompaso following suit at 12:30. Another element of the paratroopers advanced to Paso and seized the city at 10:35. By 14:00, Horiuchi managed to link up with both 1st and 2nd Sasebo Force.

== Aftermath ==
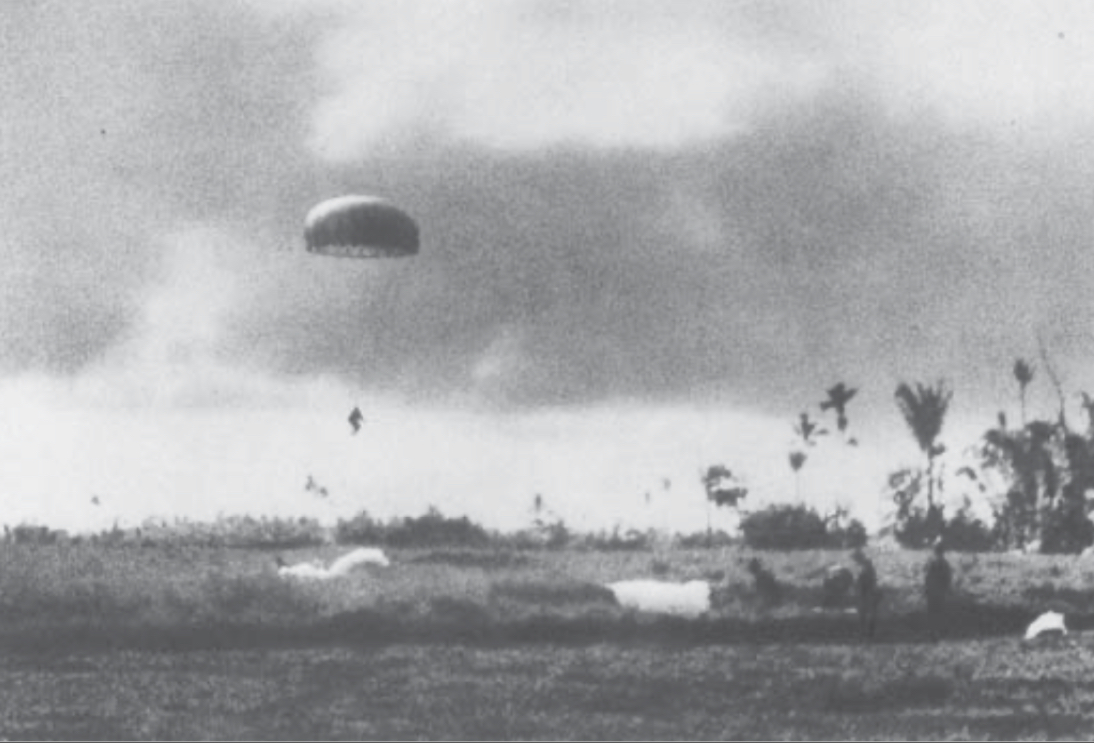
Japanese paratroopers landing on Langoan Airfield.

From 13 January, the Sasebo Combined Special Landing Force conducted a mopping-up operation of Manado and its vicinity. They completed the operation on the 16th, and assembled in Menado to start preparations for the capture of Kendari. The 1st Yokosuka SNLF, on the other hand, continued to be stationed at the Langoan Airfield until 24 April, when they were assigned in small groups to attack nearby islands on landing crafts. The force reassembled at Makassar in November 1942 to be transported back to Japan.

=== Casualties ===
Japanese casualties from the battle are as follows:

- 1st Yokosuka Special Naval Landing Force (SNLF): 32 killed, ca. 90 wounded
- Sasebo Combined Special Landing Force: 12 killed, 154 wounded

140 Dutch troops were killed in the battle, with another 48 captured. The Japanese also captured ten 8-mm field guns and a significant number of machine guns, rifles, and other supplies.

=== Reprisals ===
In retaliation for the high number of casualties, Horiuchi's paratroopers executed Dutch POW's defending the airfield. Lt. Wielinga was captured in Gorontalo and taken to Langoan, where he was beheaded on 1 March. In addition, the paratroopers also beheaded or bayonetted: Sgt. Robbemond, Sgt. B. Visscher, Pvt. Toemedi and nine Menadonese soldiers. Another two Menadonese soldiers died from torture in captivity.

== The guerrilla war ==
On the night of 11 January in Roeroekan, when the Dutch decided to commence their guerrilla war, Schilmöller gave money to three of his commanders – captains Kroon and Abbink and lieutenant Van de Laar – and ordered them to begin the guerrilla fighting in their respective regions. Minahasa's geography of open terrain, however, made it difficult to stage a guerrilla fight. Furthermore, some of the underground warehouses had already been looted by the local population, which added to the crucial problem of supplying the troops.

=== Schilmoller's Group ===
Schilmöller himself planned to set up his base in Lake Tondano and establish contact with any units he found there. With three brigades from RK's B-Company, he moved to the area between Lake Tondano and the Lembean Mountains. Yet when his only radio broke down, Schilmöller marched his group westwards to Kotamobagoe (Kotamobagu), where the Menadonese Militia Company was located, to establish communication with KNIL Headquarters based in Java. On 20 January, his group made contact with Capt. Van den Berg's group just southeast of Lake Tondano. The latter suggested that he leave B-Company behind and take the elderly and the physically weak to Kotamobagoe. Instead, Schilmöller, kept B-Company and reinforced it with Capt. Van den Berg's best troops.

The next day, the former's group left for Pasolo on the east coast, from which they would steam south as far as possible. When the group reached Pasolo, however, insufficient means of water transport meant that they could not depart all together. Half of the group, including Sgt. Chief of Staff J.F. Flips, were left behind, under the command of 1st Lt. Siegmund, to be evacuated later. However, the Japanese found them sooner, overrunning and capturing the group. After being subjected to extensive torture, Siegmund and Flips were executed in Langoan, on 27 January.

Schillmöller arrived in Kotamobagoe on 26 January, where he was able reestablish radio communication and report his conditions to the Dutch General Headquarters in Java (Bandoeng). On 31 January, the Headquarters ordered Schillmöller to make his way to Makassar, thence be transported back to Java. Under pressure from Japanese propaganda which could spark a local uprising, Schillmöller decided to bring his group to Poso, in Central Celebes. However, the Dutch were not able to acquire sea transport until 26 February, at which point Makassar had already been in Japanese hands for over two weeks (9 February).

With few options remaining, Schillmöller decided to continue to wage guerrilla warfare in Central Celebes, bolstering his group with Dutch detachments from Poso, Paloe (Palu) and Kolonedale (Kolonodale). First to join was Lt. Willem van Daalen and his 60 troops; another two detachments joined in from Poso, one under the command of Lt. Johannes de Jong. Despite the increasing number, most of the troops were lightly armed, and some of them (local militia) had no training at all. Furthermore, there was the consideration that the local population could not be expected to provide support in continuing the fight. Eventually, when he heard the news of the Dutch surrender at Java on 8 March, Schillmöller decided to capitulate.

=== Kroon's Group ===
On 12 January, Captain Kroon and the remaining 50 troops of his company left Roeroekan and headed northward to Kembes. The high rate of desertion by Menadonese soldiers left Kroon with only nine men when Japanese troops captured his group and took them to Kembes, before eventually transporting them to Manado. On 26 January, a day after they arrived, all European soldiers - except Captain Kroon - were executed. Those executed included four NCOs and two Militia-Landstorm soldiers.

=== Abbink-Masselink's Group ===
Capt. Abbink's group headed southwest to start their guerrilla fighting in the Amoerang area, yet a similar wave of desertion left him with only four soldiers. Hoping to connect with other guerrilla forces, Abbink traveled from 17 January to 1 February, when his group met with eight RK soldiers under Lt. Masselink at northeast of Amoerang. After the battle in Tinoör, Masselink and Sgt. Siwy arrived in Kakaskasen and attempted to reach the command post in Tomohon. Yet when they heard that Japanese troops had occupied the city, their guerrilla warfare had already begun.

On 13 or 14 January Masselink's group met up with 27 former soldiers who had retreated from Tanahwangko. As they began preparing for the guerrilla fighting, the high desertion rate had shrunk Masselink's group to five troops. The Abbink / Masselink group soon learned of the Dutch forces' surrender in Manado and lost contact with Schillmöller's group. These factors led them to leave for the safety of Kotamobagoe, where they raided supplies and arms from the local police. After arriving at the Manado Militia Company barracks on 9 February, they left for Poso in Central Celebes.

=== Meliëzer's Group ===
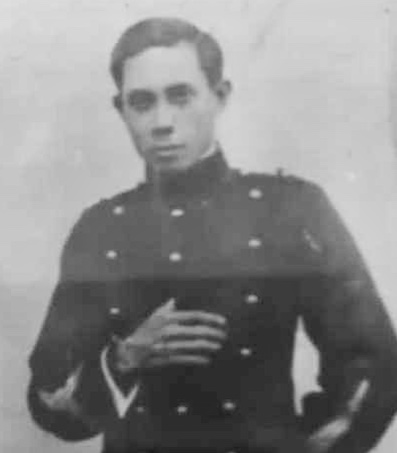
Sgt Meliezer

On 11 January, Sgt. Johan Meliëzer's E Detachment was stationed at Amoerang when it came under fire from Japanese ships, killing one and injuring three. Having lost contact with Tomohon, Meliëzer sent a motorcycle messenger to Maj. Schilmöller, who ordered the Detachment to reinforce the troops at Langoan Airfield. Making the advance under constant fear of air raids, E Detachment's 20 troops arrived at the airfield on 12 January, only to find that Japanese troops already occupied it. E Detachment's troops immediately dispersed and returned home, with many too frightened to take up arms again for guerilla fighting.

Nevertheless, Meliëzer refused to capitulate and began organizing a guerrilla group of approximately 15 troops in the second half of January. The group was also joined by civilians, among them Mrs. Hoffman (née Paratasis), the spouse of a retired MWO (Militaire Willems-Orde) Knight who was executed for aiding Dutch guerrilla troops. On 8 February, the group repulsed a day-long Japanese attack at Kanejan, just east of Toempaän (Tumpaan). In reprisal for their loss at Kanejan, Japanese troops burned down a kampong (village) and beheaded five civilians, including two women. In another battle just four days later, they captured Meliëzer's group and brought them to Langoan. After a short time in captivity, Maliëzer was beheaded in Langoan on 20 February, along with 12 other members of his group, among them Mrs. Hoffman.

=== van den Berg's Group ===
From Tasoeka, Captain van den Berg's group made camp on the slopes of the Lembean mountains on the night of 11 January. A steady stream of troops joined them, turning his group into a 101-strong force just three days later. van den Berg divided them into four brigades of 22 soldiers each, along with a staff group of 13 troops and nurses. Two of the brigades were commanded by Fuchter, while Sgt. Maj. Ranti commanded the other two and Ter Voert commanded the staff group.

On 17 January in Karor, naval personnel from Kema, under the command of 2nd Lt. W.A. de Ruiter, joined the group. Three days later, they met with Schilmöller's group, just north of Kajoe Watoe (Kayuwatu). As mentioned, Schilmöller deprived the group of most of its fighting force, thus diminishing the capacity to wage guerrilla in Minahasa. Captain van den Berg was left with just 23 troops (along with Ranti and Ter Voert) to gather other dispersed troops in the region.

While van den Berg was meeting with Schilmöller, Fuchter's brigades had been on patrol for five days when they encountered a Japanese motorcade in a chaotic nighttime fight that left Fuchter with just 10 soldiers at its conclusion. By the night of 22 January, Japanese troops raided his barracks at Kombi and captured his entire group. Ranti's brigades, who was deployed to the southeastern side of Lake Tondano on 15 January, returned from the patrol on 20 January. Half of them, however, decided to continue guerrilla fighting in Kaweng.

On 4 February, the group at Kaweng fought off a Japanese attack that killed three of their soldiers, for the unconfirmed loss of 37 Japanese troops. Meanwhile, van den Berg's group - amounting to just 1 brigade - continued to maintain itself in the Lembean mountains and carried out demolition works. The group also continued to gather soldiers with the objective of carrying out a large-scale raid on Langoan Airfield or Tondano.

Before this endeavor could be conducted, 60-80 Japanese troops – aided by the local population – encircled van den Berg's base just southwest of Kasar on 17 February. Realizing that a daylight breakout could not be successful, the group attempted to escape from the barracks at night. One by one, and under cover of darkness, soldiers from the group left the barracks, with Capt. van den Berg being the last person to leave. Despite the success of the escape, the involvement of the local population on the Japanese side meant that the situation for the group was becoming more untenable.

By 20 February, leaving the sick and elderly behind, the group moved to the mouth of Kali Rakar, where they began the trek south along the coast using wooden boats. After rowing for 14 hours, the brigade reached Pasir Poetih (Pasir Putih), ca. 80 km south of Kali Rakar. A local fisherman quickly notified the Japanese of their presence, who swiftly surrounded the coast. The group managed to flee once more, but was captured on 22 February, a day after they had come ashore. Admiring their persistent resistance and heroic stand, the Japanese War Council in Langoan spared Van den Berg's group from execution. After the war, van den Berg was made Knight Commander of the Militaire Williams-Orde, 4th Class.

=== de Jong and van Daalen's Group ===
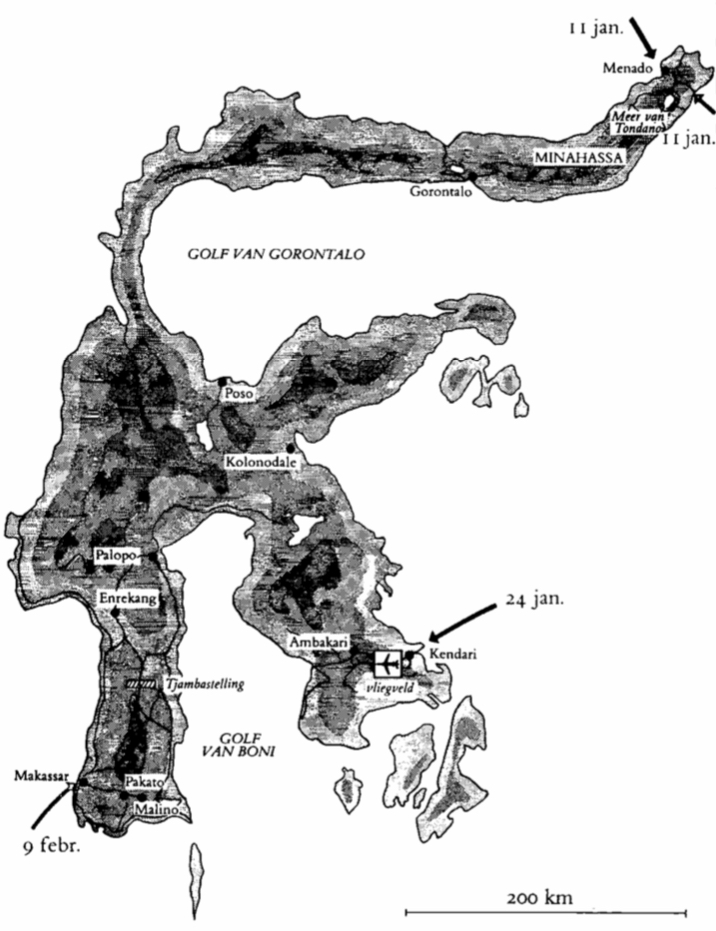
Map of Japanese attack on Celebes, January–February 1942, showing Poso and Kolonedale.

On 12 March, Schillmöller sent one of his officer to Manado to discuss the terms of surrender with the Japanese. He had hoped that his troops would be allowed to keep their weapons, to maintain order and protect the European civil servants and families that had been travelling along with the group. Instead, the Japanese demanded that the Dutch surrender all their weapons and for all members of the group to make their way to Manado. Schillmöller left the group for Manado on 23 March, while a detachment of 50 Japanese soldiers was sent to Poso to bring his group back to Manado. De Jong and van Daalen, however, rejected the demand to surrender their weapons and turned back from their decision to capitulate. When the Japanese detachment arrived in April, the Dutch opened fire on them, killing the detachment commander and wounding others.

In May, the Japanese sent a 400-strong unit to engage the Dutch guerrilla force of 125 soldiers who withdrew and continued their fight inland. De Jong and van Daalen created two groups and based themselves each in the east of Poso and around Kolonedale respectively. On 9–10 June, de Jong's group came upon a National Administration radio station in Kolonedale and established contact with Dutch representatives in Australia, requesting food, weapons and ammunition. Unbeknownst to them, Japanese forces managed to intercept the radio communication.

Responding to the newly-established contact, a "party" was created in Australia, whose task was to infiltrate Celebes and come back with intelligence or conduct sabotage operation. Named Lion, the party consisted of engineer Robert Hees, telegraphist Bernard Belloni and marine engineer Hans Brandon. Lion party left Australia on the 14-meter-long two-masted boat Samoa on 24 June and landed in Wotoe (Wotu), south of Kolonedale, after a 1,700-kilometer journey. The local population immediately reported their presence to the Japanese, who captured all three after a firefight on 12–13 July. After a period of captivity and torture, the Japanese beheaded them in Makassar on 14 September.

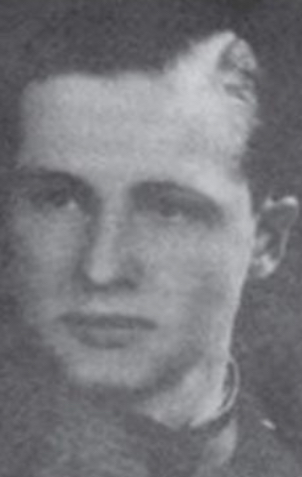
Lt. Johannes Adrianus de Jong.

Even as the Japanese continued to add pressure on both guerrilla groups, in conjunction with increasing desertions and casualties, both groups continued to inflict casualties on the Japanese force. Before July, the group had killed around 100 Japanese soldiers, at a loss of three killed and four captured. On 7 July, de Jong's troops attacked Japanese forces in Salenda (Lembosalenda). The Japanese came in three vehicles and were equipped with automatic weapons and mortars. A heavy firefight ensued until 21:00 on the 7th, and continued again from 06:00–09:00 the next day. At the end of it, seven Japanese officers and between 35-70 Japanese soldiers had been killed. Witnesses stated that all three vehicles were strewn with Japanese bodies, which were then burned with gasoline.

It was not until 15 July that the supplies were delivered from Australia. At that point, the Japanese had already landed at Kolonedale, destroyed the radio station and captured the supply drops. At the same time, local residents had been recruited to aid the search for the Dutch guerrillas. The Japanese finally captured de Jong and van Daalen on 9 August 1942. Both officers were imprisoned at Kolonedale, before transferred to Manado. After extended interrogation and torture, de Jong and van Daalen were beheaded on 25 August. Along with them, the Japanese also beheaded 15 soldiers from the guerrilla group (11 Dutch, 4 Indonesians). Earlier on 13 August, nine soldiers (eight NCOs and one private) had also been executed.

Dutch author Michiel Hegener has argued that de Jong and van Daalen's guerrilla actions had been quite effective due to Minahasa's natural suitability for, and the Japanese's lack of experience in dealing with, guerrilla warfare. The group had initial successes with hit-and-run attacks, but as the local population's support for the Japanese grew and more troops were allocated to fight the group, the effectiveness of the guerrilla war eventually dwindled away. After the war, de Jong was made Knight Commander of the Militaire Williams-Orde, 4th Class and van Daalen received the Bronze Lion, both posthumously.

=== Liberation ===
Menado remained under Japanese occupation until October 1945, when the Australian-composed "Menado Force" liberated the region.
