= Battle of Ambon =

1942 Japanese invasion of the Dutch East Indies

- Part of World War II, Pacific War, Dutch East Indies campaign
Date	30 January – 3 February 1942
Location	Ambon, Moluccas
Result	Japanese victory

Belligerents
Netherlands; Australia	Japan

Commanders and leaders
(Netherlands) Joseph Kapitz (surrendered) (Australia) William Scott (surrendered)	(Empire of Japan) Takeo Takagi (Empire of Japan) Takeo Itō

Strength
(Netherlands) 2,600 (Australia) 1,100	5,300

Casualties and losses
340 killed 2,182 captured 309 executed	95 killed 185 wounded 1 minesweeper sunk 2 minesweepers damaged

The Battle of Ambon (30 January – 3 February 1942) occurred on Ambon Island in the Dutch East Indies (now Indonesia), as part of the Japanese offensive on the Dutch colony during World War II. In the face of a combined defense by Dutch and Australian troops, Japanese forces conquered the island and its strategic airfield in several days. In the aftermath of the fighting, a major massacre of many Dutch and Australian prisoners of war by the Imperial Japanese Army (IJA) followed. Following the war, many of the IJA personnel were tried for war crimes.

== Background ==
Ambon is located in the Maluku (Moluccas) islands, just south of the much larger Seram Island. Ambon has what might be described as a "figure eight" or "hourglass" shape, and consists of two peninsulas separated by a narrow isthmus, with long narrow bays on either side of the isthmus. The key airport at Laha is in the west of the Hitu Peninsula, at the northern part of the island facing Ambon Bay. The town of Ambon is at the opposite side of the bay, on the southern part of the island on Laitimor Peninsula.

Despite being one of the islands of the Dutch East Indies' outlying regions, the Dutch knew Ambon had strategic importance as an airbase and had been reinforcing its defense since 1941, adding Royal Netherlands East Indies Army troops from Java. Yet as far back as 1940, Australia also saw the island's significance as a nearby stepping-stone for Japanese forces to attack Australia from the north. In an agreement with the Dutch government-in-exile (which still held a neutral stance on Japan in 1940), Australia agreed to bolster Dutch defenses by sending in troops and equipment to Ambon and Timor islands. Brigadier Edmund Lind, commander of the Australian 23rd Brigade, held significant reservations about sending troops to Ambon, given the lack of firepower and air assets available to the Australian troops, in addition to an absence of Australian military liaison units embedded with the local Dutch forces.

On 14 December 1941 a convoy composed of escorts HMAS Adelaide and Ballarat with the Dutch ships Both, Valentijn, and Patras carrying 1,090 troops of "Gull Force" departed Darwin and arrived at Ambon on 17 December. HMAS Swan escorting Bantam arrived with reinforcements on 12 January 1942, remaining through raids on 15–16 January until 18 January.

== Order of Battle ==
=== Japan ===
==== Ground Forces ====
Eastern Detachment (Commander: Maj. Gen. Takeo Itō)
Units under direct command	Left Assault Unit (Commander: Col. Sadashichi Doi)	Right Assault Unit (Commander: Col. Eijirō Kimura)	1st Kure Special Naval Landing Force (Commander: Kunito Hatakeyama)
Eastern Detachment HQ; One squad of the 38th Divisional Signal Unit; 3rd Company of 23rd Antiaircraft Artillery Regiment; 1st Company of 44th Field Antiaircraft Artillery Battalion; One independent engineer company; 38th Divisional 1st Field Hospital (minus one half); One platoon of the 38th Transport Regiment	228th Infantry Regiment HQ; One platoon of 3rd Company; 4th Company; 228th Infantry Regiment Signal Unit (minus three squads); 38th Divisional Signal Unit (minus two squads); Main strength of the 38th Divisional Medical Unit	2nd Battalion; One squad of the 228th Infantry Regiment Signal Unit; 4th Company of the 38th Mountain Artillery Regiment; 3rd Company of the 38th Engineer Regiment (minus one platoon); One squad of the 38th Divisional Signal Unit; 2nd Battery of the 2nd Independent Antitank Gun Battalion; Element of the 38th Divisional Medical Unit	10th Company of the 228th Infantry Regiment

==== Naval Forces ====
Eastern Attack Unit (Commander: Rear. Adm. Takeo Takagi):
2nd Destroyer Flotilla (Commander: Rear. Adm. Takeo Takagi):	Air Group 2nd Air Unit (Commander: Cdr. Ruitarō Fujita)	Base Force (1st Base Unit) (Commander: Rear. Adm. Kyūji Kubo):
2nd Escort Unit (Commander: Rear. Adm. Raizō Tanaka): 2nd Destroyer Squadron (Jintsu); 8th Destroyer Division (Ōshio, Asashio, Michishio); 15th Destroyer Division (Natsushio, Kuroshio, Oyashio, Hayashio); 16th Destroyer Division (Yukikaze, Tokitsukaze, Hatsukaze, Amatsukaze); Transport Unit; 1st Echelon: Yamaura Maru, Africa Maru, Zen’yō Maru, Miike Maru; 2nd Echelon: Kirishima Maru, Yamafuku Maru, Yamagiri Maru, Lyons Maru, Hino-maru No. 5, Katsuragi Maru	11th Seaplane Division (Chitose, Mizuho); Patrol Boat P-39	Patrol boat P-34; 21st Minesweeper Division (W-7, W-8, W-9, W-11, W-12); 1st Submarine-chaser Division (Ch 1, Ch 2, Ch 3)

=== Netherlands ===
Molukken Brigade (Commander: Lt. Col. Joseph R.L. Kapitz):
Infantry	Artillery	Other Units
Moluccas Garrison Battalion (Commander: Major H.H.L. Tieland); 1st Company (Javanese KV Company) under Capt. H.A. de Jongh Swemer; 2nd Company (various ethnicities), under Capt. E.P. Bouman; 3rd Company (Ambonese), under Capt. A.G.M. Schouten; 4th Company (various ethnicities), under Capt. J. Kaseger; 5th Company (European Militia), under 1st. Lt. W.A. Blauboer; Machine Gun Company under 1st Lt. F.E.A.H. de Jong; Five sections of two Vickers machine guns, three sections of four 80 mm mortars, two 20mm anti-tank guns, and four 7.7mm AA machine guns.; Four overvalwagen armored cars.; Boela Detachment under 1st Lt. Raden Didi Kartasasmita: 4 brigades of ca. 15 men from the Wahai town on Seram Island, as well as Geser Island; Reserve Corps Oud Militairen - RK (Commander: Capt. L.G.H. Uckerman): Two understrength companies; Depot Battalion Native Militia (Commander: Captain H.M.J. Hesterman): ca. 300 untrained troops; Home and Country Guard (Commander: 1st Lt. J. Creutz Lechleitner): Home guard stationed in the cities, Country guard in the countryside	4th Company Coast and Anti-Aircraft Artillery (450 men under Reserve Capt. D. Buur): Coastal artillery: One battery of 4x 150 mm L.40 gun (Nona Battery) under reserve 1st Lt. T.L.D. Count.; 2 x 75 mm L.55 gun; 2 x 37 mm gun; Field artillery: Two batteries of 4x 75 mm L.30 guns each under 1st. Lt. P. Jager Gerlings.; 4 x 70 mm L.14 gun; Anti Aircraft artillery: Two sections of 2x 40 mm AA guns (one at Halong naval base and one at Laha airfield); Three sections of 3x 12.7 mm AA machine guns (one at Halong, one at Laha and one at Nona Battery)	Engineer detachment under Capt. W.J.F. van Dun: Liaison and searchlight personnel; Maritime Resources Command (CMM) under Capt. Lt. Cmdr. J.J. Jager

=== Australia ===
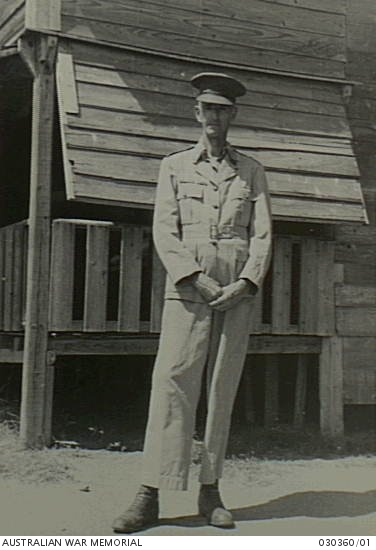
Lt. Col. William Scott, Commander of Gull Force on Ambon. He is pictured outside the Bakli POW Camp on Hainan Island, August 1945.

Gull Force (Commander: Col. Leonard Roach, replaced on 14 January by William Scott):
- Gull Force HQ
- 2/21 Battalion
- C Troop of the 18th Australian Anti-Tank Battery
- One Section of the 2/11th Australian Field Company
- One Detachment of the 23rd Australian Infantry Brigade Signals Section
- One Section of the Australian Army Service Corp (AASC)
- One Detachment of the 2/12th Australian Field Ambulance
- 23rd Australian Dental Unit
- 104th Australian Light Aid Detachment
- One Detachment of the Canteens Services
- One Detachment of the Intelligence Corps

=== United States ===
- Patrol Wing 10 (Commander: Capt. Frank D. Wagner):
  - Eight Consolidated PBY Catalina

== Prelude ==
=== Allies ===
==== Infantry ====
At the outbreak of war on 8 December 1941 Ambon was garrisoned by the 2,800-strong Molukken Brigade of the Royal Netherlands East Indies Army (KNIL) garrison, commanded by Lieutenant Colonel Joseph Kapitz and consisting of Indonesian colonial troops under European officers. The garrison was poorly equipped and trained, partly as a result of the Netherlands having been defeated and occupied by Nazi Germany. The KNIL units were not equipped with radios and relied on landlines and written communications. They included 300 partly trained reservists. The Australian Army's 1,100-strong Gull Force, commanded by Lieutenant Colonel Leonard Roach, arrived on 17 December. The force consisted of the 2/21st Battalion from the Australian 8th Division, as well as some divisional artillery and support units. Kapitz was appointed Allied commander on Ambon. On the very day the Gull Force disembarked in Ambon, Roach raised concerns that mirrored those expressed by Lind. Roach raised concerns about the lack of reconnaissance missions being conducted, medical equipment, anti-tank weapons and the absence of any field guns. This request was repeated on 23 December 1941, to which Army Headquarters rejected and reiterated the need to defend with the supplies available.

On 6 January 1942, after Dutch and British territories to the north fell to Japan and a bombing run on Ambon by Japanese aircraft, Roach once again raised concerns with Army Headquarters and stated that his forces could hold out for no more than one day without reinforcements. Following this communication, Roach was relieved of command and was replaced by Lieutenant Colonel John Scott on 14 January. This change in command caused significant problems as Scott had no prior knowledge of the situation in Ambon and was not acquainted with much of the Gull Force. Throughout early to late January, many troops of Gull Force were taken out of action because of malaria and dysentery.

Kapitz's headquarters was at Halong, between Paso and the town of Ambon. It included four armoured cars, an anti-aircraft machine gun detachment and four 40 mm anti-aircraft (AA) guns. In the belief that the terrain on the south coast of Laitimor was too inhospitable for landings and that any attack was likely to be in the east, around the Bay of Baguala, the KNIL forces were concentrated at Paso near the isthmus, under Major H. H. L. Tieland. There were small KNIL detachments at likely landing places in the north of Hitu.

Two companies of the 2/21st Battalion and 300 Dutch troops were at Laha Airfield, under the command of Major Mark Newbury. They were accompanied by Dutch artillery: four 75 mm field artillery pieces, four 37 mm anti-tank guns, four 75 mm anti-aircraft (AA) guns, four 40 mm AA guns, an AA machine gun platoon and an AA machine gun battery.

However, Scott and the remainder of the Australian troops were concentrated in the western part of Laitimor Peninsula, in case of an attack from the Bay of Ambon. "A" Company of the 2/21st and one KNIL company were stationed at Eri, on the south west side of the bay. The 2/21st Battalion's pioneer platoon was on the plateau around Mt. Nona (the highest point on Laitimor), with a Dutch anti-aircraft machine gun detachment. Smaller Australian detachments were at: Latuhalat, near the south western tip of Laitimor and at Cape Batuanjut, just north of Eri. Gull Force HQ and a strategic reserve, "D" Company, were located on a line from the Nona plateau to Amahusu beach, between Eri and the town of Ambon.

==== Air Forces ====
The Allies had few aircraft to spare. The KNIL Air Service sent No. 2 Flight, Group IV (2-Vl. G.IV) from Java to Laha. Of an original four Brewster F2A Buffalos, two crashed en route to Ambon. The Royal Australian Air Force (RAAF) sent two flights, comprising 12 Lockheed Hudson Mk 2 light bombers, from No. 13 and No. 2 Squadrons, to the area, under Wing Commander Ernest Scott (who was not related to Lieutenant Colonel John Scott). One flight was based at Laha, and another was sent to Namlea on the neighbouring island of Buru.

The U.S. Navy's Patrol Wing 10, with Consolidated PBY Catalinas, was based at the Halong seaplane station from 23 December. Wing Headquarters moved to Java on 9 January, but American Catalinas mounted patrols from Halong until 15 January when an air raid destroyed three patrol aircraft and damaged several others. The Allies then abandoned the base as it was too exposed. The Wing's seaplane tenders supported patrols but left after 8 January. Tender-based patrols from USS William B. Preston and USS Heron at anchorages further south continued until 5 February.

The Royal Netherlands Naval Air Service (Marineluchtvaartdienst) flew patrols from Ambon/Halong; GVT 17 with Catalina flying boats continued from the start of war through 14 January, when it was ordered to Java.

U.S. Navy and RAAF aircraft made several very dangerous evacuation flights into Ambon/Laha in the last days of January after Allied forces lost all air superiority to Japanese forces.

==== Naval forces ====
HNLMS Gouden Leeuw, a Royal Netherlands Navy minelayer, left Ambon in early January, after mining approaches to the island. By mid-January, the minesweeper USS Heron was the only Allied combat ship at Ambon.

=== Japan ===
The 2nd Carrier Division was assigned to support the operation. Two aircraft carriers, the Hiryū and the Sōryū, attacked Ambon on 24 January 1942. They launched 54 aircraft (18 B5N2 "Kate" torpedo bombers, 18 D3A1 "Val" dive bombers, and 18 A6M2 "Zero" fighters) and bombed port facilities and buildings on Ambon. No losses were sustained. The carrier fleet returned to Davao, Philippines on 25 January 1942, prior to the invasion on 30 January 1942.

== Battle ==
=== 30 January ===
From 6 January onward, Ambon was attacked by Japanese aircraft. Allied aircraft made some sorties against the approaching Japanese fleet, with little success. On 13 January the two Brewster Buffalo fighters, piloted by Lieutenant Broers and Sergeant Blans, attacked a flight of 10 Mitsubishi A6M Zero fighters. Broers' aircraft was hit and caught fire, but he continued to attack until it became uncontrollable, at which point he abandoned the Buffalo, using his parachute and landed in the sea. Blans was also shot down but also managed to use his parachute, landing in trees on Ambon. Both men were rescued. Broers suffered severe burns, and Blans had 17 different wounds.

The naval aviation base at Halong was soon rendered unusable by Japanese air raids and was abandoned by the Dutch and U.S. navies in mid-January.

On 30 January, about 1,000 Japanese marines and IJA personnel landed at Hitu-lama on the north coast. Other elements of the 228th Regiment landed on the southern coast of the Laitimor Peninsula. Although the Japanese ground forces were numerically not much bigger than the Allies, the Japanese had overwhelming superiority in air support, naval and field artillery, and tanks. The remaining Allied aircraft were withdrawn that day, although RAAF ground staff remained. Within a day of the Japanese landings, the Dutch detachments in their vicinity were overrun and/or had withdrawn towards Paso. The destruction of bridges on Hitu was not carried out as ordered, hastening the Japanese advance.

There was a second wave of landings, at Hutumori in southeastern Laitimor, and at Batugong, near Paso. An Australian infantry platoon was detached to reinforce the pioneers on Nona plateau. The defences at Paso had been designed to repel attacks from the north and west, and now faced assault from the south. A KNIL platoon was detached from Paso to resist the attack on Batugong, causing a gap in the Dutch lines. The Japanese took advantage of this, and were assisted by the failure of a KNIL telephone line.

=== 31 January ===
Batugong fell in the early hours of 31 January, enabling the Japanese to encircle the eastern flank of the Passo positions. Meanwhile, Kapitz ordered the Ambonese KNIL company at Eri to take up a position at Kudamati, which appeared prone to attack.

At noon on 31 January, Kapitz moved his headquarters from Halong to Lateri, closer to Passo. Telephone communications between Kapitz and his subordinates, including Scott, ceased when the Japanese cut the lines. The Japanese force which had landed at Hitu-Lama then attacked the Passo defences from the north-east. Then, in the words of the Australian official historian:

[a]t 6 p.m. a motor-cycle with sidecar was seen on the road to the west of the Passo position showing white flags and travelling towards the Japanese. Firing on the Passo perimeter was suspended on the orders of the Dutch company commanders, and the troops were allowed to rest and eat.

It is not clear who authorised the surrender. There was no immediate response from the Japanese, and – in a meeting with company commanders – Kapitz and Tieland ordered the Dutch troops to commence fighting. However, when Tieland and the company commanders returned to their positions, they found that their troops had been taken prisoner, and they were forced to surrender.

The first land attack on Laha occurred on the afternoon of 31 January. An Australian platoon northeast of the airfield was attacked by a stronger Japanese force, which it repelled. Japanese forces were also approaching the town of Ambon from the south west. At about 16:00 on 31 January the Japanese captured the town, including an Australian casualty clearing unit.

=== 1 February ===
Several Japanese attacks were launched simultaneously on 1 February:

- Kapitz and his headquarters staff were taken prisoner in the early hours. Kapitz surrendered the remaining forces in the Paso area and sent a note to Lieutenant Colonel Scott urging him to do the same. (The message did not reach Scott for two days.)
- an Australian transport unit and KNIL positions at Kudamati were attacked by infantry
- mountain guns in high ground were shelling a Dutch artillery battery on the coast at Benteng, which was forced to withdraw, putting further pressure on Kudamati.
- infantry attacked the eastern flank of Australian positions at Amahusu.
- on Nona plateau, a foothold was established in spite of fierce Australian opposition.
- Japanese aircraft and naval artillery attacks on the positions at Eri.

The Australian positions were also receiving large numbers of Dutch personnel fleeing from Paso. At 22:30, Scott ordered a withdrawal of the Allied forces at Amahusu and the south-west, to Eri. The position at Kudamati was effectively encircled.

=== 2–3 February ===
On 2 February (some sources say 1 February), the Japanese W-7-class minesweeper W-9 struck a mine laid by the Dutch minelayer HNLMS Gouden Leeuw in the Ambon Bay and sank. Two other Japanese minesweepers were also damaged by mines.

After dawn on 2 February, the main Australian force on Nona plateau, commanded by Lieutenant Bill Jinkins, was in danger of encirclement. Jinkins ordered a withdrawal to Amahusu, where he became aware that the Dutch had surrendered. Unable to ascertain the disposition of Lieutenant Colonel Scott's force, Jinkins decided to meet senior Japanese officers under truce at the town of Ambon. (Note: Jinkins' meeting with the Japanese was one of the most unusual episodes in an unusual battle. In the words of official historian Lionel Wigmore: [s]ecuring a bicycle, Jinkins rode into a Japanese road-block, and asked for ... someone in authority. An officer arrived who could speak English, and sent Jinkins under escort to the Benteng barracks, where he was taken to a Major Harikawa. The major took Jinkins to see [a captured Australian officer], who had been fed and given medical treatment; then to the Residency, where General Ito of the 38th Japanese Division had established himself. Later Jinkins was taken to see Kapitz, who wrote a second note to Scott. An attempt was made by a Japanese to get information from Jinkins, who counted ten before he answered questions, and then gave non-committal answers. Drawing his sword, the Japanese said "Why do you answer so slowly?", and received the reply "Because you don't speak good English". The Japanese looked insulted, but replaced his sword and walked away. Then Harikawa drove Jinkins to the Amahusu line, told him there were no Japanese past this point, and gave him a captured [Australian] motor-cycle to use. Shaking hands with him, he said: "If you do not come back, I hope we shall meet in the field.") They allowed him to speak to Kapitz, who wrote another note advising the Australian commander to surrender. Jinkins set off to find Scott.

Meanwhile, the Japanese forces attacking Laha were reinforced and a concentrated assault on the Allies began, including naval artillery, dive bombers, fighter planes and probing attacks by infantry. A Japanese night attack in high grass near the beach, between two Allied positions, was beaten back by an Australian platoon. However, a massive Japanese offensive commenced at dawn on 2 February. By 10:00 only about 150 Australians and several KNIL personnel were still able to fight at Laha, and Newbury ordered them to surrender.

By the morning of 3 February, the Australians around Eri were struggling to cope with increasing air and naval attacks, wounded Australians, the influx of Dutch personnel, diminishing supplies and widespread fatigue. A Japanese flag had been seen flying on the other side of the bay, at Laha. By the time Jinkins reached Lieutenant Colonel Scott, the latter had himself met the Japanese and decided to surrender. The Allied position at Kudamati was surrendered separately at midday.

== Aftermath ==
=== Laha massacre ===
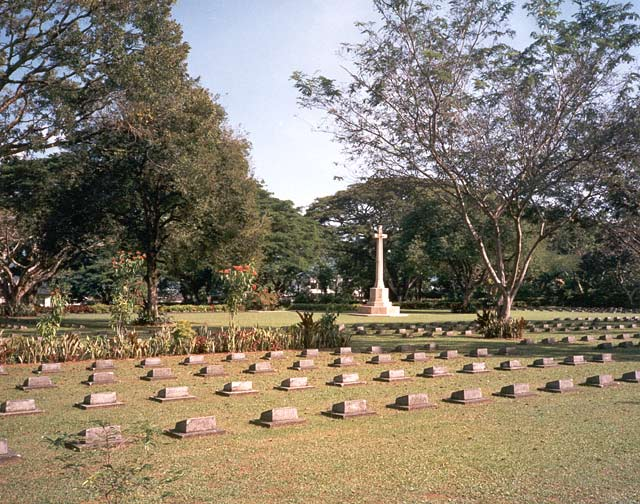
Ambon War Cemetery currently holds the graves of 1,956 servicemen, mostly Australian, Dutch and British.

Allied casualties in the battle were relatively light. However, at intervals for a fortnight after the surrender, IJN personnel chose more than 300 Australian and Dutch prisoners of war at random and summarily executed them, at or near Laha airfield. About 300 of those men who surrendered at Laha airfield on Ambon were killed in four separate massacres around the airfield. They were bayoneted, clubbed to death or beheaded. None survived. In part, this was revenge for the sinking of the Japanese minesweeper, as some surviving crew of the minesweeper took part. Those killed included Wing Commander Scott and Major Newbury. According to an Australian War Memorial principal historian, Peter Stanley, over the following three and a half years, the surviving POWs:

...suffered an ordeal and a death rate second only to the horrors of Sandakan, first on Ambon and then after many were sent to the island of Hainan [China] late in 1942. Three-quarters of the Australians captured on Ambon had died before the war's end. Of the 582 who remained on Ambon, 405 died. They died of overwork, malnutrition, disease and one of the most brutal regimes among camps in which bashings were routine.

In 1946, incidents which followed the fall of Ambon became the subject of one of the largest ever war crimes trials: 93 Japanese personnel were tried by an Australian military tribunal at Ambon. Rear Admiral Hatakeyama was found to have ordered the Laha massacres, however he had died before he could be tried. Commander Kunito Hatakeyama, who was in direct command of the massacres, was sentenced to execution by hanging. Lieutenant Kenichi Nakagawa was sentenced to 20 years imprisonment. Three other Japanese officers were executed for mistreatment of POWs and/or civilians on other occasions, during 1942–45. (The trials were the basis for the feature film Blood Oath, released in 1990.) General Itō was sentenced to death that same year for war crimes committed in other parts of the Pacific.

=== Other subsequent events ===
Approximately 30 Australian soldiers, including Jinkins, escaped from Ambon, in the space of several weeks after the surrender, often by rowing prahus (canoes) to Seram. Another result of the capture of Ambon was the realisation of Australian fears of air attacks, when Japanese planes based at Ambon took part in major air raids on Darwin, Australia on 19 February.
