= Toyoaki =

- Pronunciation: tojoakʲi (IPA)
- Gender: Male

Origin
- Origin: Japanese
- Meaning: Different meanings depending on the kanji used

Toyoaki is a masculine Japanese given name.

== Written forms ==
Toyoaki can be written using different combinations of kanji characters. Here are some examples:

- 豊明, "bountiful, bright"
- 豊朗, "bountiful, clear"
- 豊晃, "bountiful, clear"
- 豊章, "bountiful, chapter"
- 豊旭, "bountiful, rising sun"
- 豊亮, "bountiful, clear"
- 豊彰, "bountiful, clear"
- 豊昭, "bountiful, clear"
- 豊秋, "bountiful, autumn"
- 豊晶, "bountiful, sparkle"

The name can also be written in hiragana とよあき or katakana トヨアキ.

== Notable people with the name ==
- Toyoaki Hisakawa (久川 豊昌), Japanese wheelchair fencer.
- Toyoaki Horiuchi (堀内 豊秋) (1900–1948), Imperial Japanese Navy officer.

== See also ==
- Toyoaki, Gunma (豊秋村, Toyoaki-mura), former village in Gunma Prefecture, Japan.
