= Furumaki, Gunma =

Dissolved municipality in Gunma prefecture, Japan

Furumaki (古巻村, Furumaki-mura) was a village located in Gunma, Japan during the years 1889 to 1954.

== History ==
Furumaki Village was formed in 1889 as a result of the merging of three villages: Arima Village, Handa Village, and Yagihara Village. On April 1, 1954, Furumaki Village merged with Kanashima Village, Shibukawa Town, and Toyoaki Village to become Shibukawa City.

== Today ==
The area formerly held as Furumaki Village is now a part of Shibukawa City, and the name of the former village is retained in the name of an elementary school and a junior high school.
