= Kanashima, Gunma =

Dissolved municipality in Gunma prefecture, Japan

Kanashima (金島村, Kanashima-mura) was a village located in Gunma, Japan during the years 1889–1954.

== History ==
Kanashima Village was formed in 1889 as a result of the merging of five villages: Akutsu Village, Kanai Village, Kawashima Village, Nanboku Village, and Ubashima Village.

On April 1, 1954, Kanashima Village merged with Furumaki Village, Toyoaki Village and Shibukawa Town to become Shibukawa City.

== Today ==
The area formerly held as Kanashima Village is now a part of Shibukawa City, and the name of the former village is retained in the names of an elementary school, a junior high school, and a train station.
