= Toyoaki Horiuchi =

Japanese officer and war criminal (1900–1948)

- 堀内 豊秋
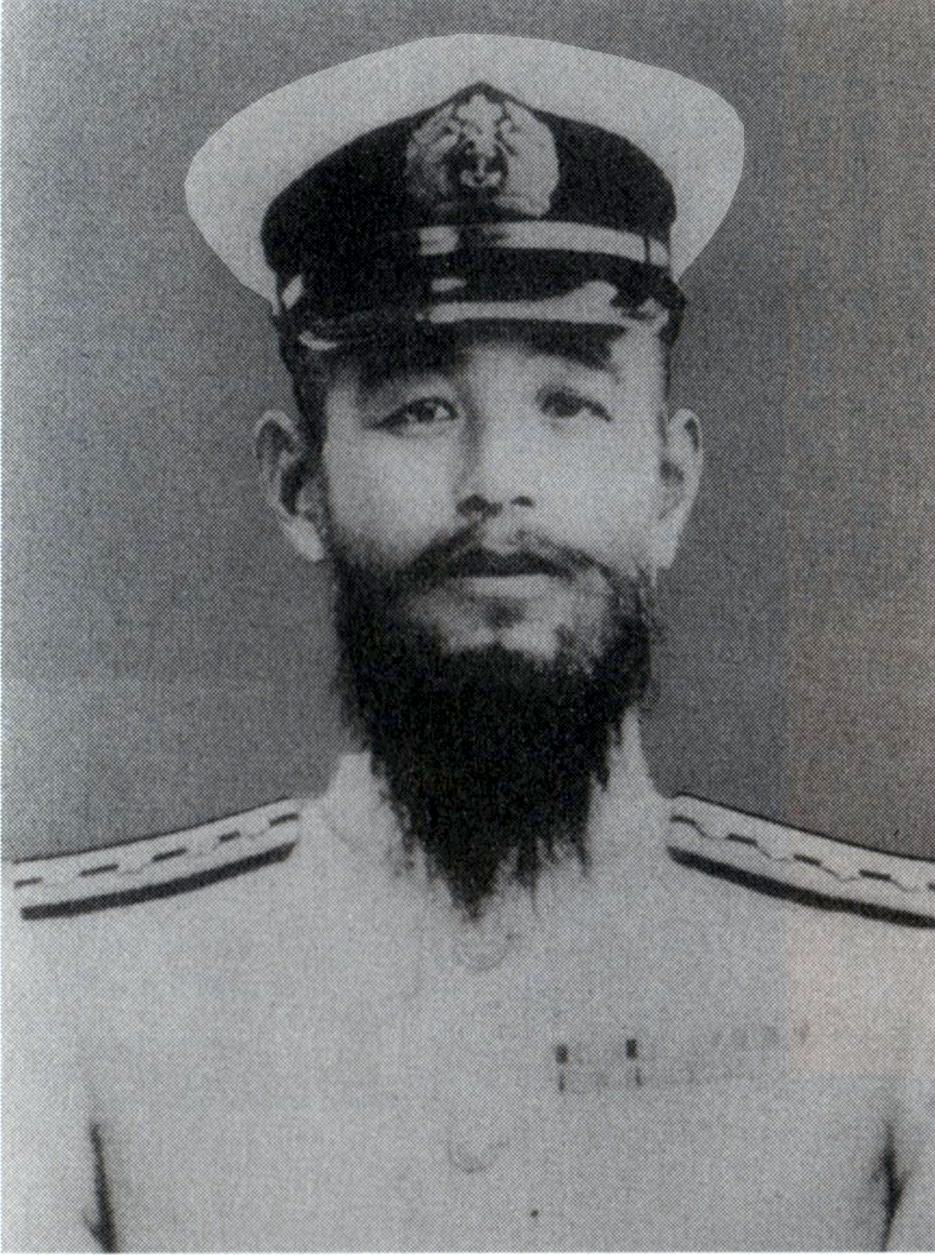
- Born: 27 September 1900; Kumamoto, Kumamoto Prefecture, Japan
- Died: 25 September 1948 (aged 48); Manado, North Sulawesi, Dutch East Indies
- Cause of death: Execution by firing squad
- Military career
- Allegiance: Empire of Japan
- Branch: Imperial Japanese Navy
- Service years: 1923–1945
- Rank: Captain: Commander in the parachute troop, naval warships; Administrator in occupied land
- Nickname: Takobozu｜タコ坊主 (takobozu(octopus))

Toyoaki Horiuchi (Japanese: 堀内 豊秋, Hepburn: Horiuchi Toyoaki; 27 September 1900 – 25 September 1948) was an Japanese Navy officer; his highest rank was daisa (大佐, captain). He was known for the development of naval gymnastics, which were meant to improve the alertness and flexibility of sailors in closed areas of warships, and he was known for leading the paratroopers. He was the first jumper during the drop on an airfield 60 km south of Manado, Indonesia, in the Battle of Manado.

== Early life ==
He was born in Kumamoto, Kumamoto Prefecture on 27 September 1900 in the house known as Mimageno Kadogoya, since his ancestors were heads of a small town. After graduation from a middle school in 1919, he entered the Naval school at Edajima, Hiroshima Prefecture and graduated in 1922. In the Naval school, he studied not only English but also Spanish and Portuguese. After graduation, he became a naval officer in September 1923, and was ordered to take a pilot student course. Unfortunately, he was struck by a whirling propeller and had to defer his training. He took another course and joined the crew of a destroyer. In December 1, 1927, he was promoted to lieutenant and took artillery. In 1928, he became a division officer in Japanese cruiser Natori and in 1929, he was a division officer in Japanese cruiser Ashigara. In 1930, he became a teacher at the Naval school. He was in charge of artillery and gymnastics. In October 1934, he was appointed as the teacher of artillery at Yokosuka. At the end of 1936, he sailed on the Japanese cruiser Isuzu as the artillery officer.

== Navy gymnastics ==
He was known for the development of his own gymnastics based on the Denmark gymnastics. As a teacher of gymnastics at the Naval school, he had long felt a need that those in the navy should attain more alertness and flexibility of actions in the limited spaces of warships and he studied various methods; traditionally the Japanese Imperial Army had employed the Swedish gymnastics. Once, he had a chance of learning the Denmark gymnastics by visiting Danish gymnasts at Okayama, and developed his own system, based on the flexible movements of extremities; because of his peculiar movements, he was nicknamed octopus man. He revealed the superiority of this gymnastics by showing the team he taught won high marks in various games and finally the Ministry of the Navy employed his method of gymnastics. In 1944, he was awarded for his development of gymnastics by the Navy Minister.

== Airborne commander ==
Prior to the beginning of the Pacific War, he was appointed as a special commander, and on 11 January 1942, his troop successfully performed an airborne operation at Manado, North Sulawesi, Indonesia. Earlier, he had been the leader in training paratroopers at Tateyama, Chiba, during which a number of trainees died due to various reasons. In November 1940, the trainees were divided into the first special troop, headed by him numbering 750, another troop was headed by Fukumi. He jumped at 9:52 a.m. on 11 January 1942 from a height of 150 metres. His flight was recorded on film and was used for propaganda purposes.

== As an Administrator ==
According to Japanese reports, Horiuchi treated the inhabitants of the island well, and was appreciated them. During his short tenure, he gave reportedly provided necessary goods such as salt, and reduced the tax to 1/4 of the previous amount. Horiuchi reportedly used the local language and according to one Japanese source, treated the prisoners of war (POWs) of the Netherlands fairly. On 11 January 1992, a goodwill meeting was held in commemoration of the 50th year of the parachute drop. Issai Horiuchi, the son of Horiuchi, carried the photograph of Horiuchi and several hundreds of the inhabitants attended the meeting. Hiroyuki Agawa, who later became a writer, was under Horiuchi when Horiuchi was transferred to Toukou of Taiwan in 1943 as a teacher of Naval students. Horiuchi said to Agawa that he was one of those who were loved by those in the occupied lands. He lost any desire or position when my assistant lieutenant died. To become a good commander, eliminate five desires, especially the sexual desire. Those who lost something will not kill others, but those whose lovers are taken by someone, may kill them. In the occupied lands, the Japanese army and navy made mistakes because of this.

== As a B-class war criminal ==
On 29 January 1948, a written indictment was read at the Manado Temporary Military Court which presented charges against Japanese Navy Colonel Toyoaki Horiuchi by the order of the Prosecutor General (dated 19 January 1948). The charges were that Horiuchi ordered or allowed Dutch army officers to be subjected to systemic terrorism. He was in a position of knowing the terrorism and did not punish Japanese officers. In 1942, at least 30 Dutch officers were killed with swords. He was in a position of knowing this but did not take necessary preventive measures. These are against the rules dealing with wartime criminals. Lawyer Ide stated that Horiuchi did not know these facts. There were 9 witnesses, most from the Dutch side. Horiuchi sent a letter of testimony that he did not know these facts. However, he felt responsible as an officer of superior rank. For a long time, he believed that we should love enemies. In January 1942, when he set up the parachute troop center, he strongly banned violence to those on the Dutch side. We treated these officers with respect and courtesy. He was impressed by Van den Berg officer who asked for permission while he was responsible. He punished his officers who gave him some violence. Based on his conviction, he freed 650 men of Indonesia. He admitted some of the violence had not been reported to him.

== Biographical timeline ==
- 27 September 1900: Born at Kawakami Village, now Kumamoto, Japan
- 31 March 1913: Graduated from Mimage Primary School
- 1 April 1913 – 31 March 1919: Student at Seiseiko Middle School
- 26 August 1919 – 1 June 1922: Cadet at Imperial Japanese Naval Academy
- 1 June 1922: Graduated from above as midshipman, ranking 156th out of 272 cadets. Assigned to Japanese cruiser ''Asama''; the fleet embarked for Brazil.
- 17 February 1923: Returned to Japan:
- 26 February 1923: Crewmember of Japanese battleship ''Nagato''
- 20 September 1923: Promoted to ensign
- 4 July – 10 December 1924: Student at Naval Torpedo School Basic Course
- 10 December 1924 – 10 April 1925: Student at Naval Gunnery School Basic Course
- 20 April 1925: the Submarine unit
- 5 August 1925: the Naval air force at Kasumigaura
- 1 December 1925: Promoted to Lieutenant (junior grade)
- 1 December 1926 – 1 December 1927: Navigator of Japanese destroyer ''Uzuki''
- 1 December 1927: Promoted to lieutenant
- 1 December 1927 – 10 December 1928: Student at Naval Gunnery School Advanced Course.
- 10 December 1928: Division Officer of Japanese cruiser ''Natori''
- 30 November 1929: Division Officer of Japanese cruiser ''Ashigara''
- 10 December 1930: Instructor at Imperial Japanese Naval Academy
- 1 December 1932 – 25 January 1933: Gunnery Officer of Japanese destroyer ''Usugumo''
- 25 January 1933 – 1 November 1933: Gunnery Officer of Japanese destroyer ''Shinonome''
- 1 November 1933 – 22 October 1934: Gunnery Officer of Japanese destroyer ''Shirakumo''
- 15 November 1934: Promoted to lieutenant commander
- 15 November 1934: Instructor at Imperial Japanese Naval Academy
- 12 October 1936 – 1 December 1936: Attached to Yokosuka Naval District
- 1 December 1936 – 15 November 1937: Gunnery Officer of Japanese cruiser ''Isuzu''
- 15 November 1937 – 20 February 1939: Gunnery Officer of Japanese cruiser ''Yakumo''
- 6 April 1938: Fleet on a distant training voyage
- 11 July – 30 July 1938: Temporary Gunnery Officer of Japanese cruiser ''Kako''
- 11 November 1938: on a distant training voyage
- 20 February 1939 – 15 November 1939: Commanding Officer, 2nd Yokosuka Special Naval Landing Force
- 15 November 1940 Promoted to commander; Dispatched to Amoi
- 25 September 1941 – 5 January 1943: Commanding Officer, 1st Yokosuka Special Naval Landing Force
- 11 January 1942: jumped at Manado as the commander of the parachute troop
- 5 November 1942: Had the honour of meeting Emperor Hirohito and showed Crown Prince Akihito his gymnastics
- 6 January 1943 – 15 January 1943: Attached to Yokosuka Naval District
- 15 January 1943: Teacher of special navy students in Macao and Taiwan
- 1 April 1943: Teacher of natives of Taiwan
- 1 December 1943 – 5 December 1943: Attached to Kure Naval District
- 5 December 1943 – 15 January 1945: Executive Officer of Japanese cruiser ''Takao''
- 1 May 1944: Promoted to captain
- 15 January 1945 – 10 February 1945: Attached to Yokosuka Naval District
- 10 February 1945 – 6 March 1945: Teacher at the Naval school
- 6 March 1945 – 15 July 1945: Teacher of Naval school at Hario
- 15 July 1945 – 25 July 1945: Teacher of naval school at Hōfu
- 25 July 1945 – 1 August 1945: Commanding Officer, 11th Kure Special Naval Landing Force
- 1 August 1945: Naval headquarters

=== After the war ===
- 15 August 1945: He was a special commander at Kochi. Later, he was engaged in repatriation works.
- 6 January 1947: Detained at Sugamo Prison as a Class B war criminal suspect.
- 28 January 1948: Indicted by the Royal Netherlands Army at Manado
- 15 May 1948: Executed at Manado
- 29 April 1953: He was released from POW.
- 10 February 1965: His ashes were returned to Kumamoto.
- 17 August 1979: Televised in Harukanaru Uminohateni by TV Asahi
- 11 December 1987: The house Mimageno Kadogoya where he was born became a memorial hall.
- 11 January 1992: Commemorative ceremony of the 50th anniversary of the parachute drop was performed in Manado
