= Toyoaki, Gunma =

Dissolved municipality in Gunma prefecture, Japan

Toyoaki (豊秋村, Toyoaki-mura) was a village located in Gunma, Japan during the years 1889–1954.

== History ==
Toyoaki Village was formed in 1889 as a result of the merging of three villages: Ishihara Village, Naka Village, and Yunoue (Miyuukida) Village. On April 1, 1954, Toyoaki Village merged with Furumaki Village, Kanashima Village and Shibukawa Town to become Shibukawa City.

== Today ==
The area formerly held as Toyoaki Village is now a part of Shibukawa City, and the name of the former village is retained in the name of an elementary school.
