= Ikazuchi-class destroyer =

Torpedo boat destroyers

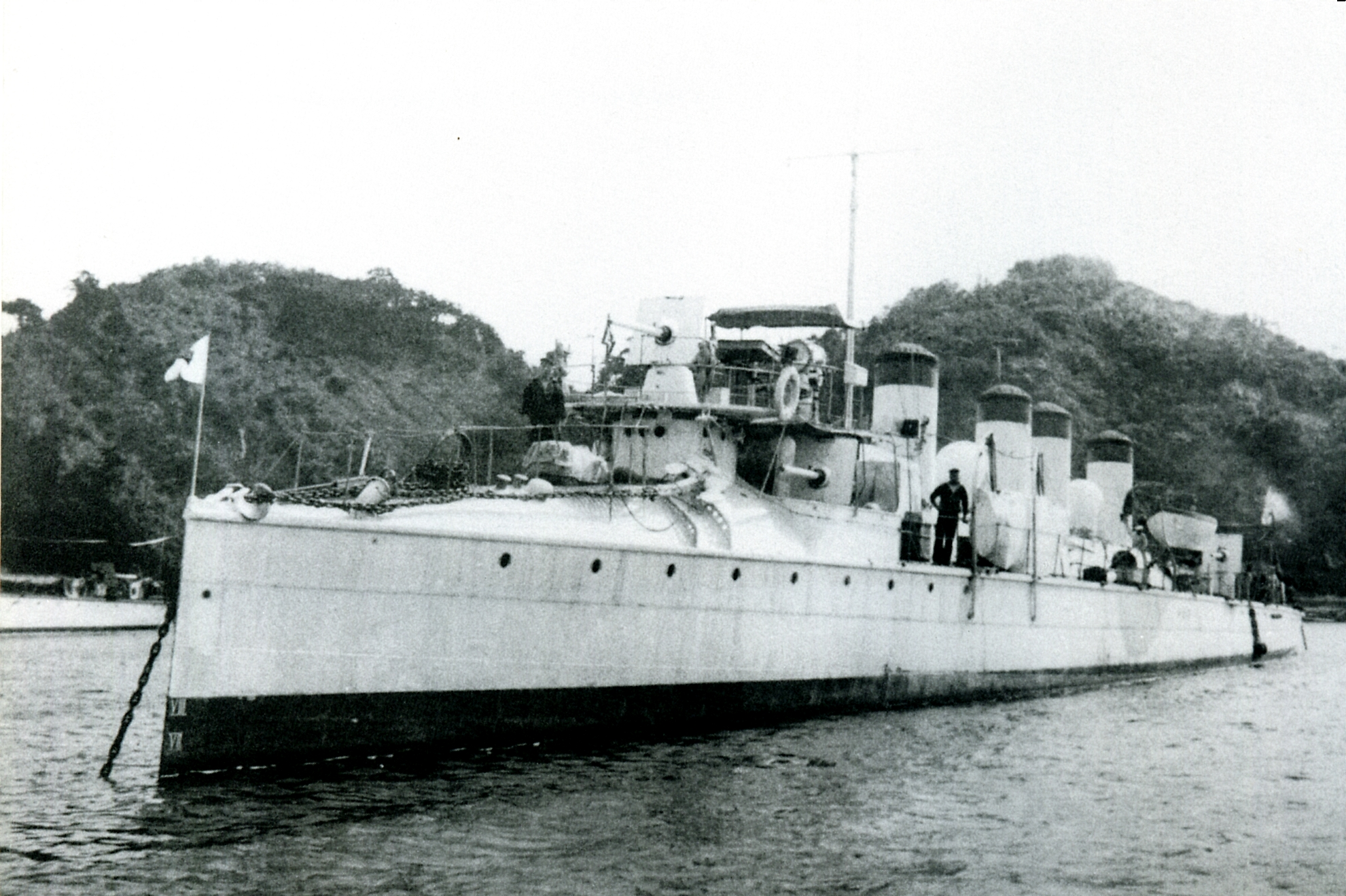
- Ikazuchi-class destroyer Sazanami at Yokosuka

Class overview
- Name: Ikazuchi class
- Builders: Yarrow & Company, Poplar, London
- Operators: Imperial Japanese Navy
- Preceded by: None
- Succeeded by: Murakumo class
- In commission: February 1899 – August 1921
- Planned: 6
- Completed: 6
- Lost: 3
- Retired: 3

General characteristics
- Type: Destroyer
- Displacement: 305 long tons (310 t) normal, 410 long tons (417 t) full load
- Length: 67.2 m (220 ft) pp, 68.4 m (224 ft) overall
- Beam: 6.2 m (20 ft)
- Draught: 1.57 m (5.2 ft)
- Propulsion: 2-shaft reciprocating, 4 Yarrow boilers, 6,000 ihp (4,500 kW)
- Speed: 30 knots (56 km/h)
- Complement: 55
- Armament: 1 × QF 12 pounder gun; 5 × QF 6 pounder Hotchkiss gun; 2 × 18 in (460 mm) torpedoes

The Ikazuchi-class destroyers (雷型駆逐艦, Ikazuchi-gata kuchikukan) was a class of six torpedo boat destroyers of the Imperial Japanese Navy, which were built in Britain in 1897–99. All were named after celestial phenomena.

== Background ==
In the First Sino-Japanese War, the Japanese navy came to understand the combat effectiveness of small, fast torpedo-equipped warships over larger, slower ships equipped with slow-loading and often inaccurate naval artillery. The Ikazuchi-class vessels were the second group of destroyers to be procured by the Imperial Japanese Navy (the Thornycroft-built Murakumo and Shinonome were ordered a day earlier than the first two Yarrow-built destroyers), but the lead ship Ikazuchi was the first to be laid down and launched. Four ships were ordered under the 1896 fiscal year budget (Ikazuchi and Inazuma on 16 January 1897, and Akebono and Sazanami on 30 April 1897), and an additional two under the 1897 budget (Niji and Oboro on 1 July 1898). All were ordered from Yarrow & Company in Poplar, London, which was considered to be the world's premier builders of destroyers and smaller warships.

== Design ==
The design of the Ikazuchi-class destroyers was based on the four-funnel "Thirty Knotters" of the Royal Navy (from 1913 grouped as the B class).

All Ikazuchi-class vessels had a flush deck design with a distinctive "turtleback" forecastle that was intended to clear water from the bow during high speed navigation, but was poorly designed for high waves or bad weather. The bridge and forward gun platform were barely raised above the bow, resulting in a wet conning position. More than half of the small hull was occupied by the boilers and the engine room. With fuel and weaponry, there was little space left for crew quarters.

The Ikazuchi-class ships were powered by triple expansion steam engines with coal-fired water-tube boilers. Armament consisted of one QF 12 pounder gun mounted on a "bandstand" on the forecastle, five QF 6 pounder Hotchkiss guns (two abreast the conning tower, two between the funnels and one on the quarterdeck) and two single tubes for 18-inch (460 mm) torpedoes.

== Operational history ==
All six Ikazuchi-class destroyers arrived in Japan in time to be used during the Boxer Rebellion to patrol the China coast and to cover the landings of Japanese ground troops. Niji was lost in an accident off the Shantung Peninsula on 3 August 1900, but the remaining five vessels saw combat service during the Russo-Japanese War of 1904–1905.

After the end of the Russo-Japanese War, Inazuma was lost in a collision with a merchant vessel off the coast of Hakodate, Hokkaidō on 16 December 1909. On 28 August 1912 the remaining four Ikazuchi-class vessels were re-classified as third-class destroyers, and were removed from front-line combat service.

Akebono and Oboro returned to combat service in World War I as part of the Japanese detachment in the Battle of Tsingtao, and in the operation to seize German colonial possessions in the South Pacific. However, their remaining time on the navy list proved to be limited. After the lead ship Ikazuchi suffered a boiler explosion at Ominato harbor due to metal fatigue in its engine on 9 October 1912, and was written off the following year, Sazanami was also retired from service. Oboro and Akebono were retained until 1 April 1921, when they were converted into auxiliary minesweepers for a brief period, but were scrapped in 1925.

== List of ships ==
| Kanji | Name (Translation) | Builder | Laid down | Launched | Completed | Fate |
|---|---|---|---|---|---|---|
| 雷 | Ikazuchi "Thunder" | Yarrow & Company, Poplar, London | 1 September 1897 | 15 November 1898 | 23 February 1899 | Boiler explosion at Ominato 9 October 1913, written off 5 November 1913, scrapped 29 April 1914 |
| 電 | Inazuma "Lightning" | Yarrow & Company, Poplar, London | 1 November 1897 | 28 January 1899 | 25 April 1899 | Lost in collision off Hakodate 16 December 1909, written off 15 September 1910 |
| 曙 | Akebono "Dawn" | Yarrow & Company, Poplar, London | 1 February 1898 | 25 April 1899 | 3 July 1899 | Retired 18 October 1921, broken up 2 May 1925 |
| 漣 | Sazanami "Ripple" | Yarrow & Company, Poplar, London | 1 June 1897 | 8 August 1899 | 28 August 1899 | Retired 1 April 1913, sold 23 August 1914 as MV Sazanami Maru |
| 霓 | Niji "Rainbow" | Yarrow & Company, Poplar, London | 1 January 1899 | 22 June 1899 | 29 July 1899 | Grounded off Shantung Peninsula 29 July 1900, written off 8 April 1901 |
| 朧 | Oboro "Moonlight" | Yarrow & Company, Poplar, London | 1 January 1899 | 5 October 1899 | 1 November 1899 | Retired 21 June 1921, broken up 1926 |
