= Japanese minesweeper No. 7 (1938) =

Japanese warship

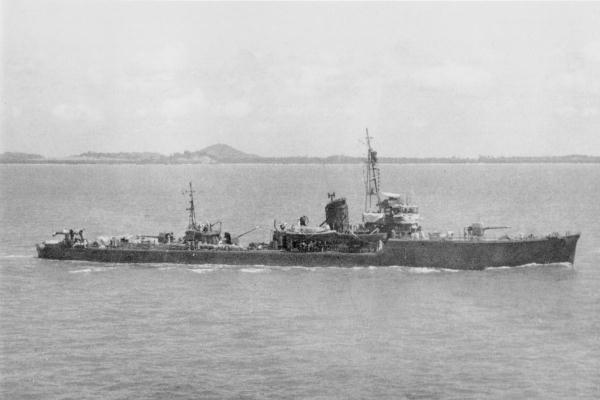
- Minesweeper No. 7 near Singapore, 23 September 1942

History

Japan
- Name: W-7
- Builder: Mitsui Engineering & Shipbuilding
- Laid down: 27 October 1937
- Launched: 16 June 1938
- Out of service: 10 June 1944
- Home port: Sasebo, Nagasaki
- Fate: Sunk, 10 June 1944

General characteristics
- Class & type: W-7-class minesweeper
- Displacement: 750 tons
- Length: 72.2 m (236 ft 11 in)
- Height: 7.9 m (25 ft 11 in)
- Depth: 2 m (6 ft 7 in)
- Installed power: 3,850 hp (2,870 kW)
- Propulsion: Steam
- Speed: 20 knots (37 km/h; 23 mph)
- Range: 2,000 nmi (3,700 km; 2,300 mi)
- Complement: 88
- Armament: 2 × 120 mm (4.7 in)/45 cal guns; 9 × 25 mm (0.98 in) AA guns; 36 depth charges

No.7 (第七号掃海艇, Dai Nana Gō Sōkaitei), also sometimes called W-7 was a No.7-class minesweeper for the Imperial Japanese Navy. It was laid down on 27 October 1937, and completed on 16 June 1938.

== Background ==
W-7 was laid down on 27 October 1937. On 16 June 1938, the ship was launched, and numbered W-7. On 25 December, it was attached to the Sasebo Naval District. On 1 June 1941, it was assigned to MineSweepDiv 21 with W-8, W-9, W-10, W-11 and W-12.

== The Philippines ==
On 27 November 1941, W-7 departed from Sasebo, and arrived at Peleliu on 4 December. On 8 December, it departed Peleliu and joined the Fourth Surprise Attack Unit. On 12 December, W-7 participated in the successful invasion of Legaspi. On 19 December 1941, after assisting briefly with operations in Borneo, came back to the Philippines to do some minesweeping. On the way to the Philippines, W-7 and W-8 helped escort a convoy to Lamon Bay, in the Philippines. The convoy arrived at Lamon Bay late at night, and conducted mine-sweeping operations. Two days later, W-7 and W-8 left Lamon Bay, and arrived at Davao on 31 December.

On 7 January, W-7 and MineSweepDiv 21's remaining ships, W-8, W-9, W-11 and W-12 (W-10 having been sunk during actions off Vigan) departed from Davao and arrived at nearby Magunaga Bay.

== Borneo ==
On 17 December, W-7, along with support from W-8, provided cover for the cruisers Kumano and Suzuya, light cruisers Yura and Kinu, seaplane tender Kamikawa Maru, destroyers Fubuki, Shirakumo, Murakumo, Shinonome, and Sagiri, the troop transport Hiyoshi Maru and a few subchasers during the invasion of Miri.

== Dutch East Indies ==
On 9 January 1942, MineSweepDiv 21's remaining ships left Magunaga Bay, with the light cruiser Nagara, the submarine chasers CH-1, CH-2, and CH-3, and patrol boats P-1, P-2, and P-34. On 11 January, the convoy reached the city of Kema, and landed on Madano an hour later. On 20 January, MineSweepDiv 21 left Mandano, and on 21 January, conducted minesweeping operations around the area of Kendari. On 23–24 January, MineSweepDiv 21, along with other ships, helped escort the Kendari invasion force. On 29 January, W-7 helped escort the Ambon Seizure Convoy, and on 31 January, assists in the invasion. On 3 February, W-7 and W-8 left Ambon Island, heading back towards Staring Bay, in Kendari. It arrived there on 5 February. On 6 February, W-7 assisted in escorting the Makassar Occupation Force, and escorted the Kupang Seizure Convoy. On 14 February, W-7 and W-8 departed Makassar, and assisted in operations off Timor between 17 and 20 February. On 25 February, W-7 and W-8 departed from Kendari, and helped escort to Surabaya. After its operations in the Dutch East Indies, W-7 was assigned a series of escort and minesweeping jobs.

== Fate ==
After over two years of safe escorting and minesweeping operations (between 25 February 1942 and 15 April 1944), W-7 was spotted by the British submarine HMS Storm while escorting a merchant ship from Port Blair, Andaman Islands. Storm fired two torpedoes at the merchant ship, but both missed, and at least one hit W-7. After hitting W-7, Storm went after the merchant vessel. After some time, a submarine chaser and an aircraft arrived on the scene and picked up survivors from W-7. Almost an hour after being hit, W-7 "emitted a huge sheet of flames and slowly sank" at 11°34′N 93°08′E, according to HMS Storm's log. On 10 June W-7 was removed from the Navy's list.
