= Japanese minesweeper No. 8 (1938) =

History

Japan
- Name: W-8
- Operator: Imperial Japanese Navy
- Builder: Uraga Dock Company
- Laid down: 11 December 1937
- Launched: 28 May 1938
- Completed: 15 February 1939
- Out of service: 10 August 1946
- Homeport: Sasebo, Nagasaki
- Fate: Scuttled by the Royal Navy in Malacca Straits on 13 July 1946

General characteristics
- Class & type: W-7 Class
- Type: Minesweeper

The No.8 minesweeper (第八号掃海艇, Dai Hachi Gō Sōkaitei), also sometimes called W-8 was a No.7 class minesweeper owned and operated by the Imperial Japanese Navy during World War II, and one of two W-7 class minesweeper to survive the war. She was laid down on 11 December 1937 and completed on 15 February 1939, then registered with the Sasebo Naval District. After making it through the war with fairly little damage, she was scuttled by the Royal Navy in the Strait of Malacca on 13 July 1946.

== Service ==
On 1 June 1941, W-8 was assigned to MineSweepDiv 21 with W-7, W-9, W-11 and W-12. W-10 was not included because she was sunk after an attack on Vigan. On 12 December 1941, W-8 participated in the capture of Legaspi, in the Philippines. On 17 December, W-8, along with W-7, provided cover during the invasion of Miri, Borneo. Between 19 December and 9 January 1942, W-8 helped escort a convoy to Lamon Bay, and traveled to several ports in the Philippines. On 9 January, W-8 participated in Operation "H", which was the invasion Celebes, Dutch East Indies. W-8, along with the other remaining W-7 Class ships, helped escort other ships of the Celebes Seizure Convoy. On 23–24 January, many of the same ships escorted some ships to the invasion of Kendari. On 31 January, many of the same ships also participated escorting the Ambon Islands invasion convoy. On 5 February, W-8 assisted in escorting the Makassar invasion convoy. On 20 February, W-8 was attacked by USS Pike, after she misidentified W-7 and W-8 as light cruisers. Both shots USS Pike fired missed. Both minesweepers got away from the submarine before it could shoot again.

After the attack, W-8 participated in a number of uneventful convoys and minesweeping activities, mainly around Truk, until 16 January 1943. On 16 January, the Japanese tanker Toei Maru was struck by a submarine, and began to sink. It is unclear whether W-8 was still escorting Toei Maru or not at the point of the attack, although it is assumed that the escort was heading back to Truk. Three days later, on 19 January, W-8 returned to the sight of the attack and picked up any survivors. After another three months, W-8 headed toward the Marshall Islands, but returned to Truk on 27 April. On 6 August, W-8 was dry-docked for repairs. She was undocked on 23 September.

Between 23 September 1943 and 1 July 1945, W-8 took part in several escorts an minesweeping operations. On 1 July, while escorting Sub Chaser no. 2, from Surabaya to Makassar, W-8 and Sub Chaser no. 2 were "attacked by 2 enemy submarines at 0228 and 0250 and sunk in 7-30S 116-15E", according to FRUMEL intercepts.

== Postwar ==
On 2 September 1945, the Japanese Instrument of Surrender was signed aboard USS Missouri by representatives from Japan, the United States, the Republic of China, the United Kingdom, the Soviet Union, Australia, Canada, the Provisional Government of the French Republic, the Kingdom of the Netherlands, and the Dominion of New Zealand. W-8 received notice on 15 September, 13 days later, while docked at Surabaya.

On 10 July 1946, W-8 arrived at Keppel Harbour, in Singapore. On 13 July 1946, she was scuttled by the Royal Navy in the Malacca Straits and officially removed from the Japanese Navy's list of ships on 10 August.
