= No.1-class submarine chaser =

World War II naval ship of Japan

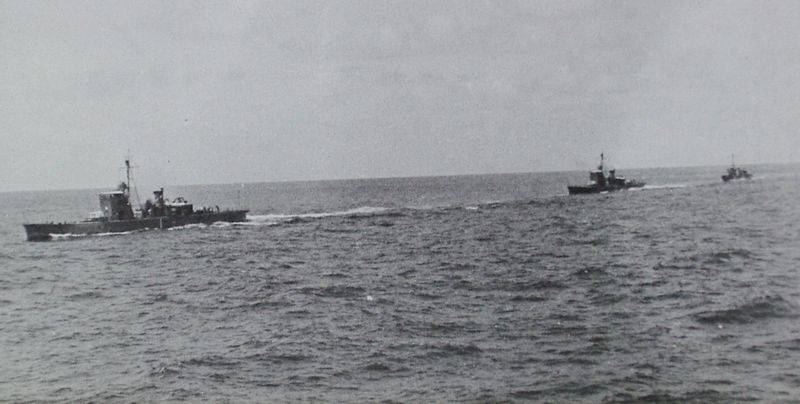
- (left to right) No. 1, No. 2 and No. 3 in 1938

Class overview
- Name: No. 1-class submarine chasers; No. 1 class (Project number K3); No. 3 class (Project number K4)
- Builders: Uraga Dock Company; Tōkyō Ishikawajima Shipyard; Asano Shipyard
- Operators: Imperial Japanese Navy
- Succeeded by: No. 4 class
- Cost: 1,525,700 JPY (No. 1-class); 1,530,000 JPY (No. 3-class)
- Built: 1933 – 1936
- In commission: 1934 – 1946
- Planned: 3
- Completed: 3
- Lost: 1
- Retired: 2

General characteristics No. 1-class
- Displacement: 266 long tons (270 t) standard; 280 long tons (284 t) trial; and after late 1934; 377 long tons (383 t) trial
- Length: 65.30 m (214 ft 3 in) overall; 64.00 m (210 ft 0 in) waterline
- Beam: 5.90 m (19 ft 4 in)
- Draught: 1.43 m (4 ft 8 in)
- Propulsion: 2 × Kampon Mk.22 Model 8 diesels; 2 shafts, 3,400 bhp
- Speed: 24.0 knots (27.6 mph; 44.4 km/h); and after late 1934; 21.1 knots (24.3 mph; 39.1 km/h)
- Range: 1,500 nmi (2,800 km) at 14 kn (16 mph; 26 km/h)
- Complement: 65
- Armament: 2 × 40 mm heavy machine guns; 36 × depth charges; 1 × depth charge thrower; 1 × Type 93 active sonar; 1 × MV hydrophone

General characteristics No. 3-class
- Displacement: 270 long tons (274 t) standard; 285 long tons (290 t) trial
- Length: 56.10 m (184 ft 1 in) overall; 55.00 m (180 ft 5 in) waterline
- Beam: 5.60 m (18 ft 4 in)
- Draught: 2.10 m (6 ft 11 in)
- Propulsion: 2 × Kampon Mk.22 Model 6 diesels; 2 shafts, 2,500 bhp
- Speed: 20.0 knots (23.0 mph; 37.0 km/h)
- Range: 1,500 nmi (2,800 km) at 14 kn (16 mph; 26 km/h)
- Complement: 60
- Armament: 2 × 40 mm heavy machine guns; 36 × depth charges; 2 × Type 94 depth charge projectors; 1 × depth charge thrower; 1 × French SCAM active sonar; 1 × Type 93 hydrophone

The No. 1-class submarine chaser (第一号型駆潜艇, Dai 1 Gō-gata Kusentei) was a class of submarine chasers of the Imperial Japanese Navy (IJN), serving during World War II. Three vessels were built in 1933-36 under the Maru 1 Programme and the Maru 2 Programme. They have two sub classes.

== Background ==
- In World War I, German U-boat raged. The IJN began maintenance of an anti-submarine boat as a lesson in this, because Japanese shoreline and sea-lanes were very long. The IJN had some submarine chaser type tugboats and yard ferries. However, they were small and their speed was low.
- The IJN wanted to give the anti-submarine boats a speed of more than 20 knots, because their Kaidai III submarine already achieved a 20kt surfaced.

== Design ==
- The Naval Technical Department (Kampon) made draft shallow to give them high speed. They achieved 24 kt speed hereby.
- The No. 1 and the No. 2 were completed in March 1934, and they were assigned to the 1st Submarine Chaser Division, Yokosuka Naval Defence Squadron.
- However, because of their very shallow draft they lacked the rolling performance. This fact become evident after the Tomozuru incident.
- The Tomozuru incident affected the No. 1-class. The No. 1 and the No. 2 were sent to the Uraga Dock Company in July 1934, and repairs were started. They were equipped 80 tons ballast and mounted a ballast keel. The drawings for the No. 3-class boat was also revised.

== Service ==
- Late 1934, Repairs were completed.
- October 1936, The No. 3 assigned to 1st SchDiv. They always shared an action afterward.
- In 1938, the 1st SchDiv was transferred to the No. 1 Base Force (Shanghai).
- On 5 September 1941, the No. 1 Base Force was transferred to the 2nd Fleet.
- In December 1941 – March 1942, the 1st SchDiv engaged to the Battle of the Philippines and Dutch East Indies campaign.
- On 10 March 1942, the 1st SchDiv was transferred to the No. 21 Special Base Force (Surabaya), 2nd Southern Expeditionary Fleet, Southwest Area Fleet.
- On 1 May 1942: The 1st SchDiv was dissolved. They spent all their time for escort operations in the Java Area.

== Ships in classes ==
=== No.1-class ===
- Project number was K3. 2 vessels were built under the Maru 1 Programme. They equipped the MV hydrophone by Submarine signal company and latest active sonar the Type 93.

Ship	Builder	Laid down	Launched	Completed	Fate
No. 1	Uraga Dock Company	19 June 1933	23 December 1933	24 March 1934	Scuttled by Royal Navy off Singapore on 11 July 1946. Decommissioned on 10 August 1946.
No. 2	Tōkyō Ishikawajima Shipyard	9 June 1933	20 December 1933	25 March 1934	Sunk by USS Blueback at north of Lombok on 27 June 1945.

=== No.3-class ===
- Project number was K4. Only 1 vessel was built under the Maru 2 Programme. The No. 3 was equipped the French SCAM active sonar and latest hydrophone the Type 93. The No. 3 was classed in the No. 1-class in the IJN official documents.

Ship	Builder	Laid down	Launched	Completed	Fate
No. 3	Asano Shipyard	17 April 1935	6 June 1936	5 October 1936	Scuttled by Royal Navy off Singapore on 11 July 1946. Decommissioned on 10 August 1946.

== Photos ==
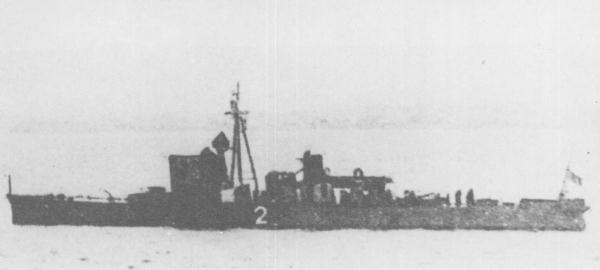
No. 2 in 1934

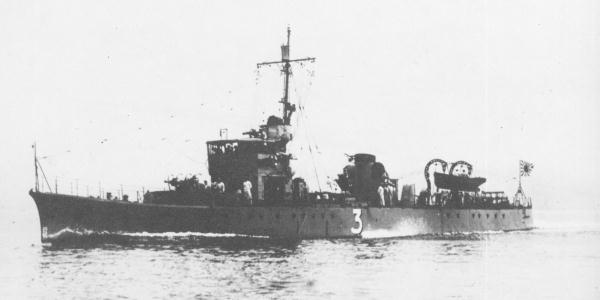
No. 3 in 1936

== Bibliography ==
- Ships of the World special issue Vol. 45, Escort Vessels of the Imperial Japanese Navy, "Kaijinsha"., (Japan), 1996.
- The Maru Special, Japanese Naval Vessels No. 49, Japanese submarine chasers and patrol boats, "Ushio Shobō". (Japan), 1981.
