= W-7-class minesweeper =

Japanese minesweeper class

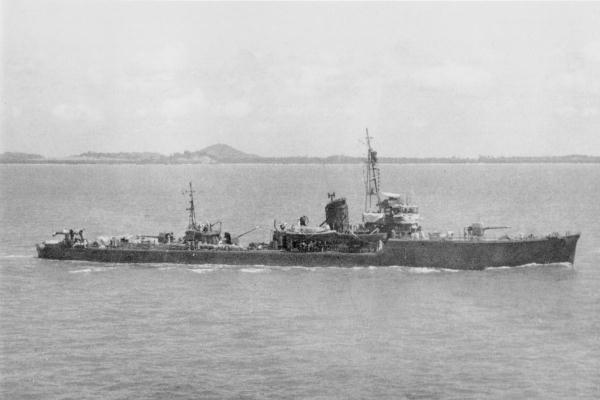
- No.7 on 23 September 1942

Class overview
- Name: No.7-class minesweeper
- Builders: Maizuru Naval Arsenal; Tama Shipyard; Tōkyō Ishikawajima Shipyard; Uraga Dock Company
- Operators: Imperial Japanese Navy
- Preceded by: No.13 class
- Succeeded by: No.19 class
- Cost: 2,230,823 JPY (in 1937)
- Built: 1937 – 1939
- In commission: 1938 – 1946
- Planned: 6
- Completed: 6
- Lost: 5
- Retired: 1

General characteristics
- Type: Minesweeper
- Displacement: 630 long tons (640 t) standard
- Length: 72.50 m (237 ft 10 in) overall
- Beam: 7.85 m (25 ft 9 in)
- Draught: 2.60 m (8 ft 6 in)
- Propulsion: 2 × triple expansion stages reciprocating engines; 2 × Kampon mix-fired boilers; 2 shafts, 3,850 shp
- Speed: 20 knots (23 mph; 37 km/h)
- Range: 2,000 nmi (3,700 km) at 14 kn (16 mph; 26 km/h)
- Complement: 98
- Armament: 3 × 120 mm (4.7 in) L/45 naval guns; 2 × 25 mm AA guns; 36 × depth charges; 1 × Type 94 depth charge projector; 6 × paravanes

The No.7-class minesweepers (第七号型掃海艇,, Dai Nana Gō-gata Sōkaitei) were a class of minesweepers of the Imperial Japanese Navy (IJN), serving during the Second Sino-Japanese War and World War II. Six vessels were built in 1937–1939 under the Maru 3 Keikaku.

== Background ==
- Project number I4. Improved model of the No.13 class. They were built to update timeworn No.7 class, No.9 class and No.11 class. Kampon deleted minelayer facility from them, because IJN hoped they act in Yangtze River. And they added to one 120 mm (5 in) naval gun for engage with National Revolutionary Army. Therefore, the No.7 class had the silhouette which resembled the Chidori and Ōtori-class torpedo boats.

== Ships in class ==
Ship #	Ship	Builder	Laid down	Launched	Completed	Fate
49	No. 7	Tama Shipyard	27 October 1937	16 June 1938	15 December 1938	Sunk by HMS Storm off Port Blair on 15 April 1944. Decommissioned on 10 June 1944.
50	No. 8	Uraga Dock Company	11 December 1937	28 May 1938	15 February 1939	Scuttled by Royal Navy at Singapore on 10 July 1946. Decommissioned on 10 August 1946.
51	No. 9	Maizuru Naval Arsenal	7 February 1938	10 September 1938	15 February 1939	Struck a naval mine and sunk at Ambon on 1 February 1942. Decommissioned on 10 April 1942.
52	No. 10	Tōkyō Ishikawajima Shipyard	21 December 1937	22 September 1938	15 February 1939	Sunk by air raid off Pandan, Caoayan (near Vigan) on 10 December 1941. Decommissioned on 15 March 1942.
53	No. 11	Uraga Dock Company	30 May 1938	28 December 1938	15 July 1939	Sunk by air raid off Makassar on 28 March 1945. Decommissioned on 10 May 1945.
54	No. 12	Tōkyō Ishikawajima Shipyard	28 May 1938	18 February 1939	15 August 1939	Sunk by USS Besugo off Flores 08°13′S 119°14′E on 6 April 1945. Decommissioned on 25 May 1945.

== Bibliography ==
- Ships of the World special issue Vol.45, Escort Vessels of the Imperial Japanese Navy, "Kaijinsha"., (Japan), February 1996
- The Maru Special, Japanese Naval Vessels No.50, Japanese minesweepers and landing ships, "Ushio Shobō". (Japan), April 1981
