= Japanese submarine chaser No. 2 =

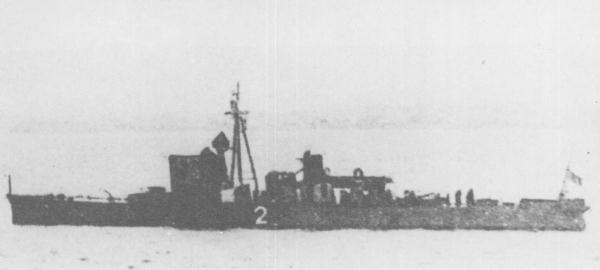
- No. 2 in 1934

History

Empire of Japan
- Name: CH-2
- Builder: Tōkyō Ishikawajima Shipyard
- Laid down: 9 June 1933
- Completed: 25 March 1934
- Stricken: 10 August 1945
- Fate: Torpedoed and sunk, 27 June 1945

General characteristics
- Class & type: No.1-class submarine chaser
- Displacement: 266 long tons (270 t) standard; 280 long tons (284 t) trial; and after late 1934; 377 long tons (383 t) trial
- Length: 65.30 m (214 ft 3 in) overall; 64.00 m (210 ft 0 in) waterline
- Beam: 5.90 m (19 ft 4 in)
- Draught: 1.43 m (4 ft 8 in)
- Propulsion: 2 × Kampon Mk.22 Model 8 diesels; 2 shafts, 3,400 bhp
- Speed: 24.0 knots (44.4 km/h; 27.6 mph); and after late 1934; 21.1 knots (39.1 km/h; 24.3 mph)
- Range: 1,500 nmi (2,800 km) at 14 kn (16 mph; 26 km/h)
- Complement: 65
- Armament: 2 × 40 mm heavy machine guns; 36 × depth charges; 1 × depth charge thrower; 1 × Type 93 active sonar; 1 × MV hydrophone

The Japanese submarine chaser CH-2 was a No.1-class submarine chaser of the Imperial Japanese Navy during World War II. Built by Tōkyō Ishikawajima Shipyard, she was completed on 25 March 1934.

== Construction and design ==
CH-2 was laid down at the Ishikawajima Shipbuilding & Engineering Co. shipyard, Tokyo on 9 June 1933, was launched on 20 December 1933 and commissioned on 25 March 1934.

The ship was 64.0 metres (210 ft 0 in) long at the waterline and 62.0 metres (203 ft 5 in) between perpendiculars, with a beam of 5.90 metres (19 ft 4 in) and a draught of 1.43 metres (4 ft 8 in). Displacement was 266 long tons (270 t) standard as built. Two diesel engines generating a total of 3,400 brake horsepower (2,500 kW) drove two propeller shafts and propelled the ship at a speed of 24 knots (44 km/h; 28 mph).

Anti-submarine armament consisted of two depth charge throwers with 36 depth charges carried, while anti-aircraft armament consisted of two 40 mm guns and two machine guns. Crew was 45 officers and men.

== Service ==
On 12 March 1934, the Japanese torpedo boat Tomozuru capsized during sea trials due to poor stability, Following this accident, it was realised that like many Japanese warships, the CH-1 class suffered from excessive topweight, and CH-2 was modified by adding ballast, increasing displacement to 376 long tons (382 t) standard and 400 long tons (410 t) full load.

=== World War II ===
CH-2's first mission of the war was on 7 December 1941 as part of Operation M, for the landings in the northern Philippines. She participated in the landings at Aparri on 10 December 1941.

CH-2 also supported Operation H, the invasion of Celebes in the Dutch East Indies along with numerous minesweepers, patrol boats, both of her sister ships, and the cruiser Nagara.

After the invasion of the Dutch East Indies was complete CH-2 took up convoy duties, escorting convoys of merchants and transports throughout the South Pacific and engaging in active anti-submarine patrols. On 27 March 1944 the sub chaser depth charged USS Rasher in retaliation for that submarine's sinking of Nichinan Maru. The American submarine escaped without damage.

On 22 October 1944, CH-2 assisted in depth charging an enemy submarine that had attacked the minelayers Wakataka and Itsukushima. Although it was reported that the submarine, which turned out to be the Dutch HNLMS Zwaardvisch, was sunk the attacker escaped without damage.

== Fate ==
On 27 June 1945, while off Lombok, Indonesia, escorting a convoy, she was attacked by USS Blueback. A hit in the stern sealed her fate and she sank at 07°30′S 116°15′E. The American submarine observed some crew members abandoning ship in a lifeboat before departing the area. CH-2 was struck from the navy list on 10 August 1945.

== Sources ==
- Gardiner, Robert; Chesneau, Roger, eds. (1980). Conway's All The World's Fighting Ships 1922–1946. Conway Maritime Press. ISBN 0-85177-146-7.
- Jentschura, Hansgeorg; Jung, Dieter; Mikel, Peter (1977). Warships of the Imperial Japanese Navy, 1869–1945. Annapolis, Maryland, USA: Naval Institute Press. ISBN 0-87021-893-X.
