= Admiral Talbot =

Admiral Talbot may refer to:

- Cecil Ponsonby Talbot (1884–1970), British Royal Navy vice admiral
- Charles Talbot (Royal Navy officer) (1801–1876), British Royal Navy admiral
- Fitzroy Talbot (1909–1998), British Royal Navy vice admiral
- John Talbot (Royal Navy officer) (c. 1769–1851), British Royal Navy admiral
- P. H. Talbot (1897–1974), U.S. Navy rear admiral
