= Battle of Balikpapan =

Battle of Balikpapan may refer to several actions in the Pacific campaign of World War II:

- Naval Battle of Balikpapan, on 24 January 1942, in which American destroyers damaged a Japanese troop convoy in the Makassar Strait, near Balikpapan in the Dutch East Indies
- Battle of Balikpapan (1942), on 23-25 January 24, 1942, in which the Japanese captured Balikpapan from the Dutch
- Battle of Balikpapan (1945), in which Allied forces recaptured the area, July 7 – July 21, 1945
