= Battle of Banjarmasin =

1942 battle involving Japanese Empire and Dutch Empire

- Part of World War II, Pacific War, Dutch East Indies Campaign
Date	31 January – 10 February 1942
Location	Banjarmasin, southern Borneo Island
Result	Japanese victory

Belligerents
Netherlands	Japan

Commanders and leaders
(Netherlands) Henry Halkema	(Empire of Japan) Kyōhei Yamamoto (Empire of Japan) Yoshibumi Okamoto

Strength
c. 500	c. 1,000

Casualties and losses
Troops deserted, evacuated to Java, or surrendered later on	9 killed or died from sickness 80% (ca. 800) stricken with Malaria

The Battle of Banjarmasin (31 January – 10 February 1942) took place as part of the Japanese offensive to capture the Dutch East Indies during World War II. The Japanese conducted a pincer attack from sea and land to capture a strategic airfield in Banjarmasin (old spelling: Bandjarmasin or Bandjermasin) in preparation for the capture of Java Island.

== Background ==
Prior to 1941, Banjarmasin was the administrative centre for East and South-East Borneo, and seat of the governor of Dutch Borneo. Oelin (Ulin) Airfield that was located 25 kilometers outside the town ranged only 420 kilometers from Surabaya, making it a key target in the Japanese plan to destroy Allied air power in Java prior to their offensive. The Dutch established another airfield at Kotawaringin, 350 kilometers to the west.

== Order of Battle ==
=== Japan ===
==== Ground Forces ====
- Land Drive Unit (Commander: Col. Kyōhei Yamamoto):
  - 146th Infantry Regiment (minus 1st and 2nd Battalion)
  - One artillery battery
  - One engineer company (minus one platoon)
  - Medical unit
  - One transport company
- Sea Drive Unit (Commander: Capt. Yoshibumi Okamoto):
  - One infantry company
  - One engineer platoon
  - One independent engineer platoon
  - One radio squad

=== Netherlands ===
==== Ground Forces ====
- Kotawaringin (Commander: Lt. G.T.C. Schoenmaker):
  - Ten brigades (One brigade: ca. 15-18 troops)
  - Two Lewis guns for AA defense
- Dajoe (Dayu) (Commander: Reserve 1st. Lt. W.M.J. van der Poel):
  - One brigade
  - 25 militarized field police
- Tanahgrogot (Commander: 1st. Lt. W. Michielsen):
  - 60 troops
- Amoentai (Amuntai) and Barabai:
  - Three Landwacht brigades each, armed with hunting rifled
- Kandangan (Commander: Reserve 1st. Lt. D.E.P. Scholte):
  - Three Landwacht brigades
  - 25 conscripts
- Oelin (Commander: Capt. F. Bolderhey):
  - Nine brigades (ca. 150 regular infantry and conscripts)
  - Two 7.7 mm machine gun
  - Few Lewis guns
- Banjarmasin (Commander: Capt. J.H. van Epen)
  - One Stadswacht company
  - Six conscript brigades
  - Two overvalwagens

== Dutch Plans ==
Dutch troops in Banjarmasin were mainly tasked with defending both Oelin and Kotawaringin airfields. Despite the essence of the mission the troops came from various groups that were poorly equipped; some units were not provided with uniforms until January 1942. Many of the Stadswacht and Landwacht brigades were only set up in 1941 and had training in handling weapons or maneuvering in battle.

Upon completion of the main mission, all soldiers outside Java had to conduct guerrilla warfare. The command staff and governor would relocate to Moearatewe, in North Barito, while the administrative staff would remain behind, hoping to continue working normally after the occupation. Three storage facilities were set up along the route to Moearatewe as part of this.

== Japanese Plans ==
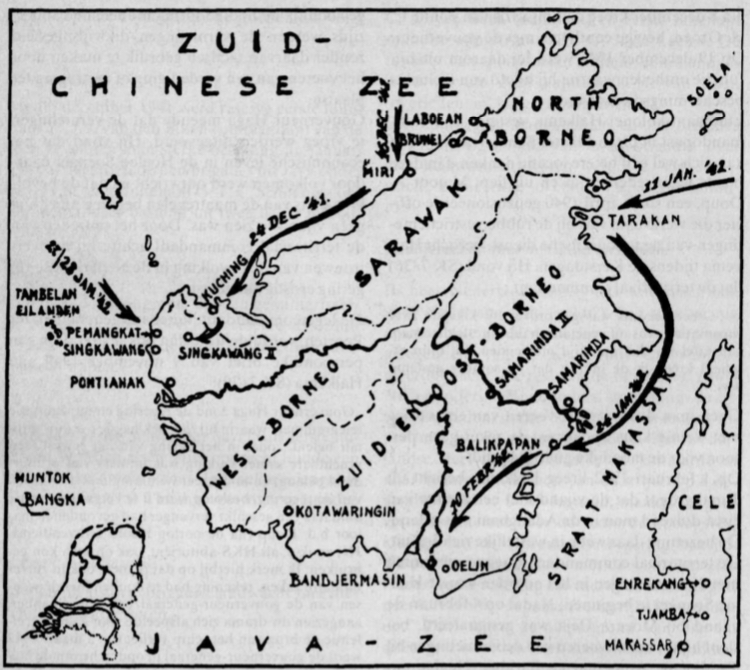
Route of Japanese attack on Borneo from 1941 to 1942, including that on Banjarmasin

Considering that the Japanese did not have any updated intelligence on the condition of the airfields in Banjarmasin, in addition to the lengthy time it would take to set up the airfield for operation once captured, the Navy cancelled its involvement in the operation. Instead, the Army planned to conduct a two-pronged attack on the city from the sea and overland, with the latter being the main thrust.

Col. Yamamoto's Land Drive Unit that planned to attack overland will leave Balikpapan on the night of 30 January and land in Tanahgrogot at dawn on the 31st. The Unit would then traverse the jungle and mountains southward, with an element of its force advancing as vanguard to block any Dutch ambush attempts. After moving out of the jungle, it would quickly advance to the city to get ahead of any Dutch efforts to blow up the bridges while retreating. Since provisions were to be procured mostly on site, troops only carried nine days worth of rations with them.

Meanwhile, Capt. Okamoto's Sea Drive Unit, would leave a few days before Yamamoto's Unit. Using landing craft, the unit would only move at nighttime. During the day they planned to go upriver near the river mouths and hide under the forest to avoid Allied air reconnaissance. To secure passage through the channel west of Laoet (Laut) Island, Okamoto planned to conduct a night raid on Kotabaroe (Kotabaru) to gather supplies and intelligence. Upon landing at Banjarmasin, the Unit would advance and capture Oelin airfield. Opposite of the Land Drive Unit, Okamoto's troops needed to procure provisions along the advance.

== The Battle ==
=== Prelude Raids ===
After the fall of Tarakan, daily Japanese air raids began to be seen over Banjarmasin. The first Japanese fighters conducted strafing runs on Oelin airfield on 20 January, but caused little damage. During the air raid on 21 January, 4 Mitsubishi Zeros and a Babs reconnaissance plane of the Tainan Air Wing destroyed a PBY Catalina from MLD's 16th Flight Group (GVT.16) that had landed on the Barito Delta. A major loss occurred on 27 January, when eight Glenn Martin bombers stopped by at Oelin en route to the Samarinda II Airfield. When the air raid came, the Lewis Guns that were stationed as AA defense were ineffective against the Japanese planes. The Japanese destroyed six of the bombers and damaged the other two, dealing a severe blow to the Dutch morale.

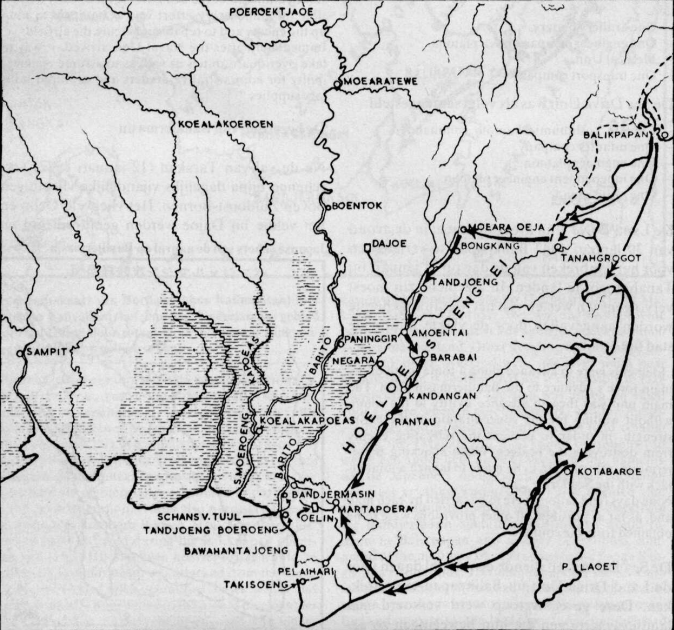
Advance of the Land and Sea Drive Unit, 31 January-10 February 1942. The Land Drive Unit is indicated by the single arrow; The Sea Drive Unit indicated by the double arrow.

=== Land Drive Unit ===
The advance party of Yamamoto's Unit left Balikpapan on the morning of 31 January and landed at Adang Bay at 20:00 on the same day. Upon being notified about the landing, Lt. Michielsen, who was in command of the defense in Tanahgrogot, withdrew with his 60 troops after destroying the town. Families of indigenous soldiers were prohibited from being evacuated, while families of European soldiers could evacuate on their own terms. Michielsen had set up a camp with food supplies 20 km east of Tanahgrogot to accommodate the evacuees, who now had joined the ranks of retreating soldiers. Many soldiers, however, deserted along the way or went back to their families, leaving Michielsen with five soldiers - two of them sick - when he reached Tandjoeng.

By 1 February at 10:30, the Japanese advance guard seized Tanahgrogot. On 2 February, the remainder of Yamamoto's Unit left Balikpapan and landed on Tanahgrogot on the 3rd. As they advanced southward to Banjarmasin, the Land Drive Unit had to contend with the lack of adequate road, which rendered their motor vehicles and 600 bicycles useless. They climbed up steep mountains and crossed makeshift log bridges over deep gorges, while fending off attacks from mosquitoes, leeches and other insects. Yamamoto reached Moeara Oeja (Muara Uya) on 4 February. Under Halkema's orders, the Landwacht brigades in Tandjoeng (Tanjung), Amoentai and Barabai scorched the city and retreated without a fight.

This order brought Halkema in clash with the Dutch Borneo governor, Bauke Jan Haga. Gov. Haga perceived the destruction to be premature, as it would disrupt the economic life in the cities along the Hoeloe Soengei (Hulu Sungei/Sungai), which refers to the line of towns and villages located east of the Barito River. In protest, Gov. Haga sent official complaint to the Dutch army commander, Heinrich ter Poorten, asking for Halkema to be replaced. In agreement, ter Poorten sent Major A. Doup to replace him.

At Dajoe, Lt. van der Poel's troops destroyed the small airfield in the town before retreating up north to Boentok (Buntok) and lost communication with the command staff. When the local population mistakenly reported that the Japanese forces are advancing on the town, many of van der Poel's indigenous soldiers and field police deserted, leaving him with five men. On 7 February, Halkema reinforced the troops at Kandangan with two brigades from Oelin (armed with a Madsen machine gun) under the command of 1st. Lt. W.K. Remmert. Remmert had to delay Yamamoto's advance along the Kandangan-Martapoera Road, before regrouping with a conscript brigade at Oelin Airfield. By 11:30, Remmert's troops arrived in Kandangan and began to take up position north of the town, before assisting Scholte in the demolition effort. Both groups then withdrew into a defensive position in Martapoera to protect Oelin Airfield.

On the night of 8 February, Dutch reports from Rantau stated that one of their ship steamed along the river towards Banjarmasin with its lights off. Not excluding the possibility that there might be Japanese troops on board, Halkema ordered Capt. van Epen to send three brigades (one conscript and two Stadswacht, reinforced with a machine gun and a Madsen) on steam barges from Oelin to Negara to prevent the Japanese from attacking Banjarmasin via the Barito River, before pulling back again to Oelin. By 22:00, Halkema ordered for the destruction of Banjarmasin and Pelaihari. As the destruction, and with it, the vandalism began to took place, Gov. Haga was advised to leave the city, but he insisted that he will not do so until 23:30. Afterwards, Gov. Haga left for Moearatewe, before moving further up north to Poeroektjaoe (Puruk Cahu).

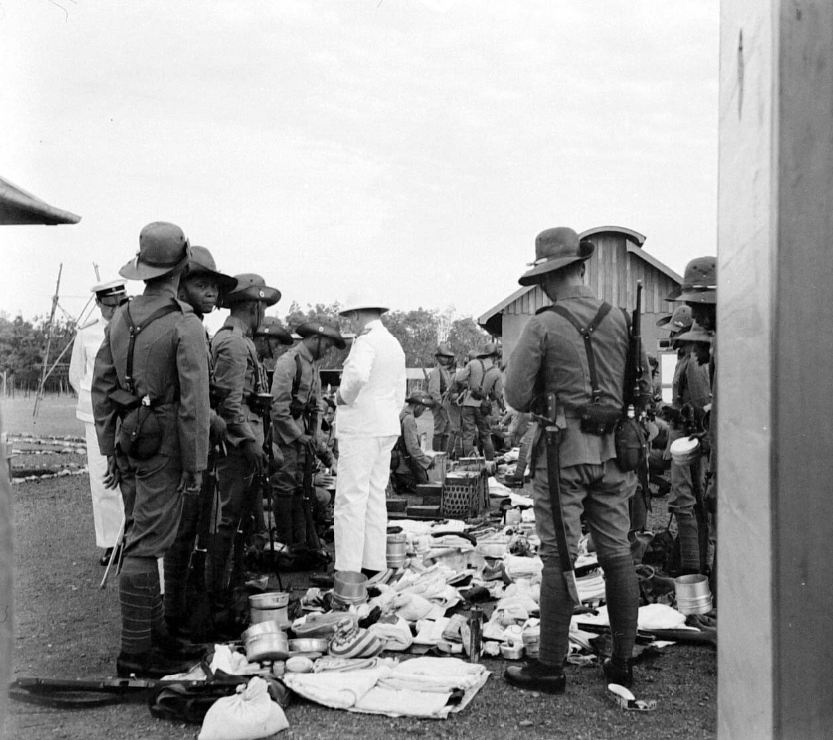
Dutch troops undergoing inspection in Tanahgrogot, sometime in the 1940s

Two days earlier, ter Poorten had commissioned Doup as a lieutenant-colonel and appointed him as Halkema's successor, citing the latter's health status (rheumatism) and mental imbalance. Doup left Surabaya on 8 February, but as his plane reached the coast of Borneo at 01:00, he saw large fires on the mouth of Barito River, where Banjarmasin would be. As the radio operator failed to make contact with the ground, the pilot, Lt. J.A.J. Oonincx refused to land; the failure to make contact was due to the destruction of the radio station at Oelin Airfield. Doup eventually returned to Surabaya. After sending out the destruction orders, Halkema and a few staff officers drove to Oelin Airfield to hand over command to his successor. At the airfield, he saw a plane that circled above the airfield several times before leaving without making a landing attempt.

As Halkema drove to Oelin, part of his staff had begun to embark on the ships Irene and Otto. Both ships were directed to steam towards Schans van Tuyl (junction of the Martapoera (Martapura) and Barito River), where they will await further instructions. In the meantime, Banjarmasin's harbormaster ordered a steamboat to head to Takisoeng (Takisung), a coastal town south of Banjarmasin, where it would be at Halkema's disposal. From Schans van Tuyl, Irene and Otto eventually headed towards Java, taking Dutch refugees from Banjarmasin and part of Halkema's staff with them.

After seeing Doup's plane left, Halkema drove in the direction of Takisoeng, where he arrived on the mouth of Barito River on 9 February. In the evening, a Borsumij (Borneo Sumatera Maatschappij; Borneo Sumatera Company) ship appeared with the rest of the staff that didn't embark on the Irene and Otto. After boarding Halkema, the ship then received a telegram from Bandung, ordering them to head west to Kotawaringin and wait for further instructions there.

The Borsumij ship steamed on at 19:00; Dutch forces on board that managed to evacuate to Kotawaringin at the time only numbered at 75 troops. After docking at Kotawaringin on the 11th, Halkema and other non-essential personnels left by plane for Java on 12 February, while the infantrymen under Capt. W.C.A. van Beek reinforced the forces at the airfield. Back at the Oelin Airfield, Capt. Bolderhey waited until 9 February for Doup's flight to arrive, unaware that it already did the day before. By nightfall on the 9th, he decided to leave the airfield and head up north to Koeala Kapoeas (Kuala Kapuas). The hostile attitude of the local population, along with desertion made guerrilla fighting out of option. With fewer choices at hand, Bolderhey decided to make an attempt to reach Java. On 11 February, he and his troops left in a small 17-meter boat, alongside 180 other Dutch civilians (including 20 women). After sailing in the rough seas for six days, Bolderhey landed in Madura.

Yamamoto's Unit, once it came out of the jungle, tried to make pursuit of the retreating Dutch forces, but the advance had scattered the force. However, an advance company led by Capt. Kataoka competed with the engineer company to be the first to drive off the Dutch. As the Land Drive Unit advanced, they obtained bicycles, vehicles and provisions from many supportive local population. At 09:00 on 10 February, Kataoka, with the engineer company, seized the Oelin Airfield with no resistance. By nightfall, the Unit had occupied Banjarmasin.

=== Sea Drive Unit ===
Okamoto's Sea Drive Unit left Balikpapan on the evening 30 January on four large and two small landing crafts and began to make their way along the coast southward. In accordance with the plan, the Unit concentrated their advance at rivermouths at night according to plan, with a naval officer attached to pilot the movement. At day, the landing crafts were camouflaged under mangrove forests to avoid detection. Coming through Apar Besar Bay, Pamukan Bay and Klumpang Bay, Okamoto made a night raid on Kotabaroe, encountering no opposition and capturing many supplies and provisions. On 8 February, the Sea Drive Unit landed 80 km from Banjarmasin and advanced without opposition to the Oelin Airfield. Since the Land Drive Unit had already dispersed Halkema's troops, Okamoto's troops reached Oelin Airfield without opposition on 10 February.

== Aftermath ==
By the end of the battle, the Land Drive Unit had advanced 400 km south from their landing point in Adang Bay to Banjarmasin, 100 km of which were done through the jungle. Base material for the 11th Air Fleet arrived at Oelin via fishing boats on 20 February, and by the 25th, an element of the 23rd Air Flotilla landed on the airfield, which was soon to be used as a base for the advance to Bali.

=== Casualties ===
The battle had cost the Japanese 9 soldiers killed in action or died from sickness. About 80% (ca. 800) troops of the Land Drive Unit were stricken with malaria.

The Dutch casualties were unknown. However, the battle has been characterized with the high desertion rates among the local troops.

=== Post-Capitulation Surrenders ===
After the Dutch capitulation on Java on 8 March, troops who were holding out in Borneo began to surrender as well. Michielsen's group handed themselves over to the Japanese in Tandjoeng after the capitulation announcement. After holding out in Poeroektjaoe for some time, van der Poel's group surrendered to the Japanese in Banjarmasin on 14 March. The Japanese then instructed him, along with Capt. van der Epen who had arrived at Banjarmasin on the same time, to guide the troops who will pick up Gov. Haga in Poeroektjaoe. Gov. Haga was captured on 17 March. On 14 December 1943, he died in jail after being tortured for conspiring to bring back Dutch rule into Banjarmasin through an armed uprising, in what is to be known as the "Haga Plot".

=== Kotawaringin Airfield ===
The units that stayed behind at Kotawaringin Airfield were reinforced with the 2/15 Punjab battalion under Lt. Col. M.C. Lane that had arrived exhausted from Miri & Kuching. On 24 February, a ship carrying supplies arrived to provide additional food stocks to the defenders. It was not until late March-early April that the Japanese finally arrived in Kotawaringin and defeated the defenders.

=== Liberation ===
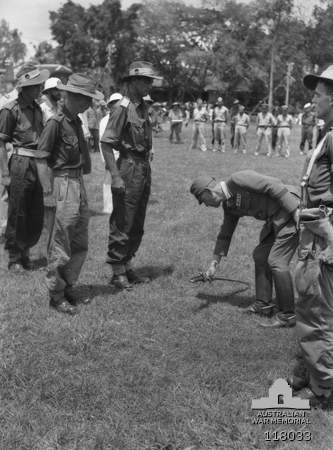
Major General Michio Uno lays his sword at the feet of Lt. Col. Murray Robson, Commanding Officer, 2/31 Infantry Battalion during the Japanese surrender ceremony.

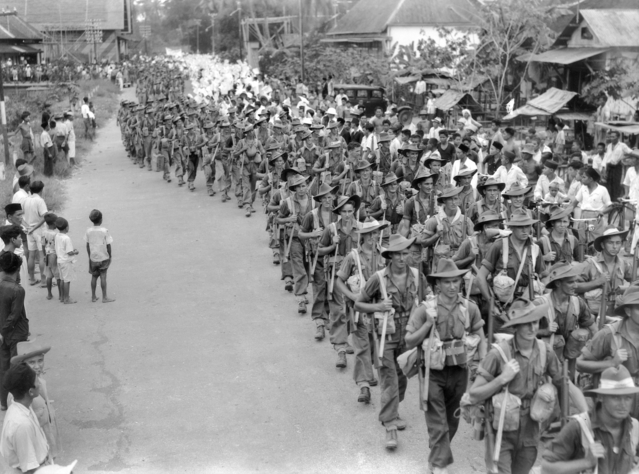
Soldiers of the Australian 2/31st Battalion passing through Bandjermasin, being given an enthusiastic welcome by local civilians.

Banjarmasin remained under Japanese occupation until September 1945, when it was liberated by the 2/31st Battalion of the Australian 7th Division.
