= Overvalwagen =

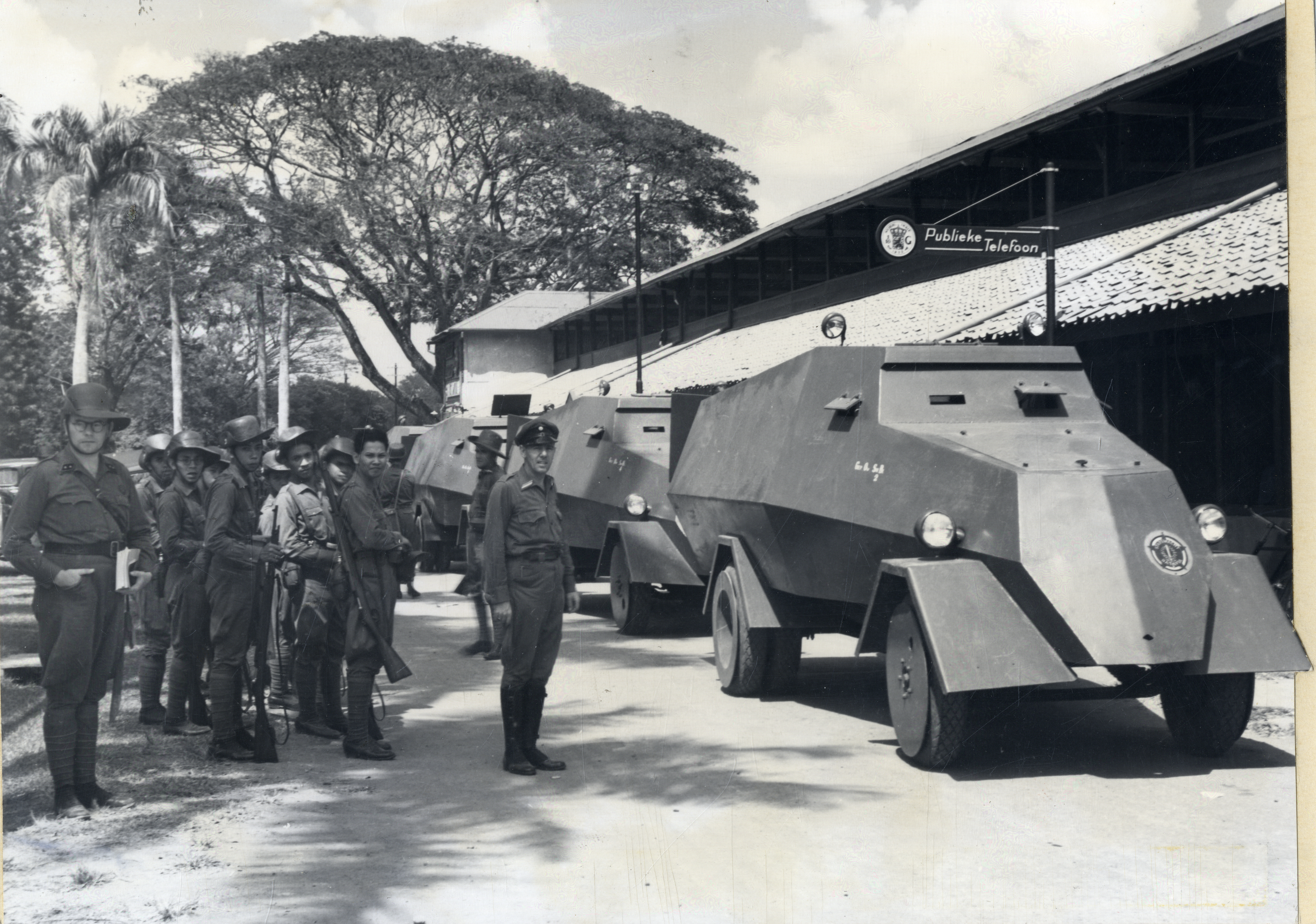
- Overvalwagen Type A of the Batavia Stadswacht, c. 1941
- Type: Armoured personnel carrier/armoured car
- Place of origin: Dutch East Indies

Service history
- In service: 1940–1962
- Used by: Royal Netherlands East Indies Army; Royal Netherlands Navy; Imperial Japanese Army; Indonesian Army
- Wars: World War II; Indonesian National Revolution; Darul Islam rebellion

Production history
- Manufacturer: Machinefabriek Braat NV (Type B)
- No. built: ~25–90

Specifications
- Mass: 6 tonnes (5.9 long tons)
- Length: 4.20 m (13 ft 9 in)
- Width: 2.20 m (7 ft 3 in)
- Height: 2.10 m (6 ft 11 in)
- Crew: 2
- Armor: 6–20 mm
- Engine: Chevrolet Mercury V8, 95 hp
- Operational range: 200 km (120 mi)
- Maximum speed: 90 km/h (56 mph)

The Overvalwagen (Dutch: Assault vehicle) was an armored car or armored personnel carrier that saw service with the Royal Dutch East Indies Army and its auxiliary forces. It was used during the Second World War's Dutch East Indies Campaign.

== History ==
The Overvalwagen's exact origins are unknown, but earliest known records indicate that they were designed sometime in 1940 for the Stadswacht (Urban Home Guards). The Stadswacht were tasked to maintain order in the cities and to guard against a possible airborne assault on urban areas. These so-called Type A Overvalwagens were based on Chevrolet 4×2 truck chassis. The Type A was built using Chevrolet truck chassis provided from General Motors factory in Tanjung Priok, with the armor plate using ship steel plating supplied by shipyards, such as the Batavia Droogdok Maatschappij.

A more advanced model of the vehicle was later designed and used by the Royal Netherlands East Indies Army (KNIL). It was referred to as Type B or more commonly Braat Overvalwagen. This model was designed by a KNIL Engineer Corps Captain, Luyke Roskott (b. July 25, 1921 - d. ?) and were based on 1940 Chevrolet 4×2 Cab Over Engine (COE) truck chassis. The beginning of this model's names, Braat, refers to the Machinefabriek Braat NV, which had workshops in Soerabaja (Note: modern spelling: Surabaya) on Eastern Java, where they were ostensibly and evidently produced.

Roughly 25 at least were made, though higher numbers say 90 models were produced domestically in the Dutch East Indies of all variants. It is possible, that the 25 estimate is in reference not to the total made ever, but rather exclusively those produced in Surabaya, though this is unconfirmed.

== Service history ==
The Overvalwagen Type A were meant to be used by the Stadswacht and were organized in mobile columns (rapid reaction forces) to guard the urban areas. It was used by Stadswacht garrisons in Batavia (Note: modern day Jakarta), Soerakarta (Note: modern spelling: Surakarta), Soerabaja, Medan, and Makassar. As the possibility of war loomed over the horizon, most of the Type A were requisitioned by regular KNIL units and would see action during the Dutch East Indies campaign in such places as Eastern Sumatra, Palembang, and Timor.

The Type B or Braat Overvalwagen were used extensively by KNIL units in the archipelago during the Japanese invasion. Several units were present during the initial Japanese landings on Tarakan, Manado, Balikpapan, Kendari, Ambon and Japanese offensives in Samarinda and Banjarmasin during January–February 1942. It would ultimately see action during the Japanese invasion of Java in February–March 1942. Apart from the KNIL, the Braat Overvalwagen also saw service with the Dutch Marines as part of the Navy battalion in Eastern Java. The cannon-armed Marines Overvalwagen engaged a Japanese column during the fighting around Soerabaja in March 1942.

After the Dutch surrender on 8 March 1942, surviving units of both Type A and Type B Overvalwagen would see service with the Imperial Japanese Army garrisons in the archipelago. Some units were sent outside of the East Indies to reinforce Japanese forces elsewhere. Several examples were captured by Allied forces on New Britain after the Japanese surrender in September 1945.

Surviving units of both Type A and Type B Overvalwagen would again saw service with the KNIL during the Indonesian National Revolution from 1945 to 1949 against the Indonesian Republican forces. During this conflict, several Type B Overvalwagen were converted for use on the railways. It was converted by welding an Overvalwagen hull to a flat wagon and installing a canvas cover over the open compartment to protect against scorching sunlight and hand grenades. The modification were done by Manggarai railway workshop. These armored wagons were attached to trains in the Priangan area as a security measure against possible sabotage or ambush by Indonesian insurgents. The Dutch soldiers dubbed them schietwagens (shooting wagons). After the end of the conflict in December 1949, the remaining Overvalwagen were handed over to the Indonesian Army (TNI-AD).

The Overvalwagen armored wagons were known as panser rel (rail armored vehicle) by the Indonesian. The unpowered panser rel were used by the Indonesian Army in 1955 in response to sabotage on the Priangan railway lines by Darul Islam rebels. They were attached in front of the locomotive of the trains heading from Bandung to Banjar and Ciamis. The panser rel were manned by personnel from the 4th Cavalry Battalion of Kodam III/Siliwangi. They would escort the trains until the end of the rebellion in 1962. One example is preserved at the Satriamandala Museum in Jakarta.

Beside the unpowered panser rel inherited from the Dutch, the Indonesian Army also created the "Panser Rel V-16" armored draisine, built by the Army Equipment Workshop (precursor of Pindad). It was created by joining two Braat Overvalwagen hulls back to back and installed it on an 8-axle railway chassis. Panser Rel V-16 was powered by two Ford VBA65HI diesel engines and capable of reaching 80 km/h (50 mph). It was armed with two M1919 Browning machine guns, each at the front and the back. The armored draisine was also manned by personnel from the 4th Cavalry Battalion. It saw service in 1955–1959, patrolling and escorting trains between Ciawi in Tasikmalaya and Cicalengka on the outskirts of Bandung. It is preserved at the Mandala Wangsit Siliwangi Museum in Bandung.

== Gallery ==
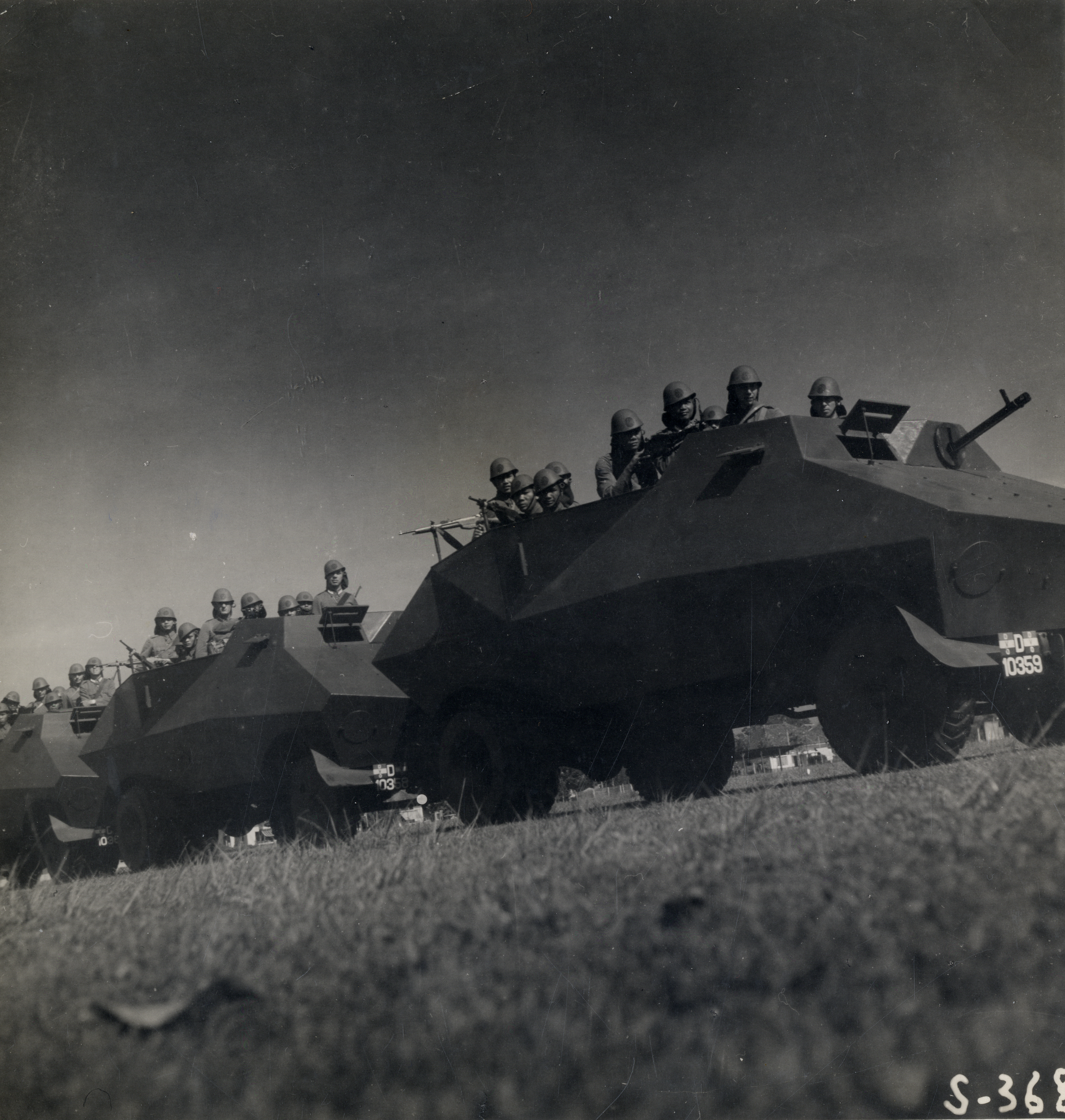
Braat Overvalwagens in Priangan Residency, 1941

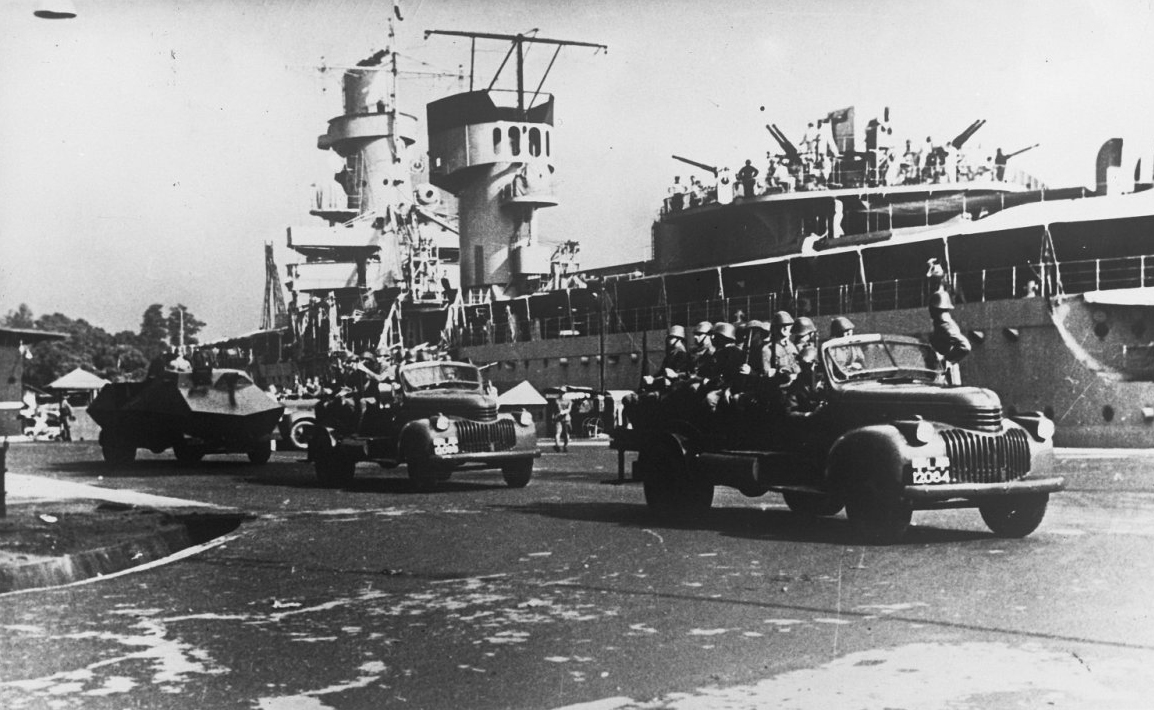
HNLMS De Ruyter moored in Surabaya port. KNIL mechanized forces are with a Braat Overvalwagen armored car behind the rest.

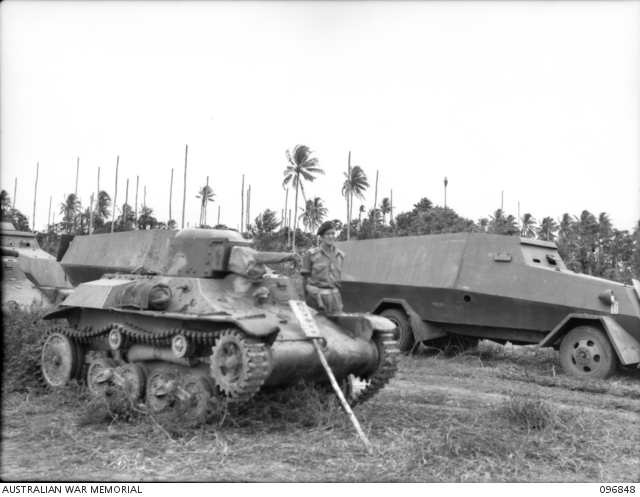
Surrendered Japanese Overvalwagen Type A and Type 97 Te-Ke tankette at Rapopo Airstrip, New Britain, September 1945.

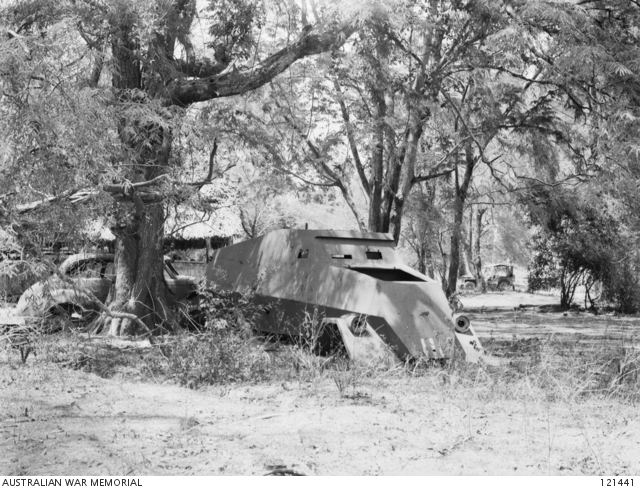
Derelict Overvalwagen Type A in Portuguese Timor, December 1945.

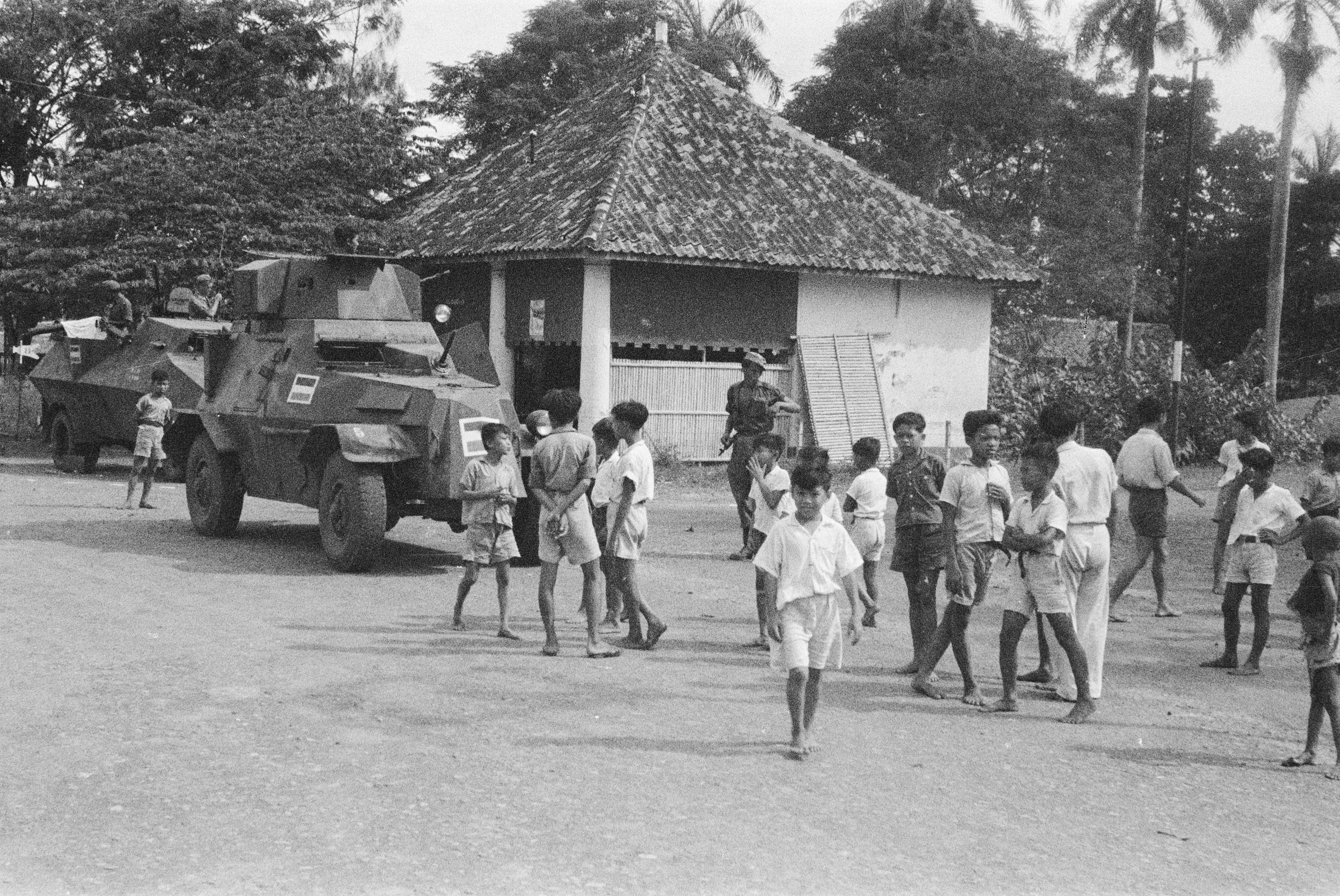
Braat Overvalwagen (background, partially obscured) and Marmon-Herrington Mk III (foreground) of KNIL 1st Infantry Battalion in Tangerang, May 1946.

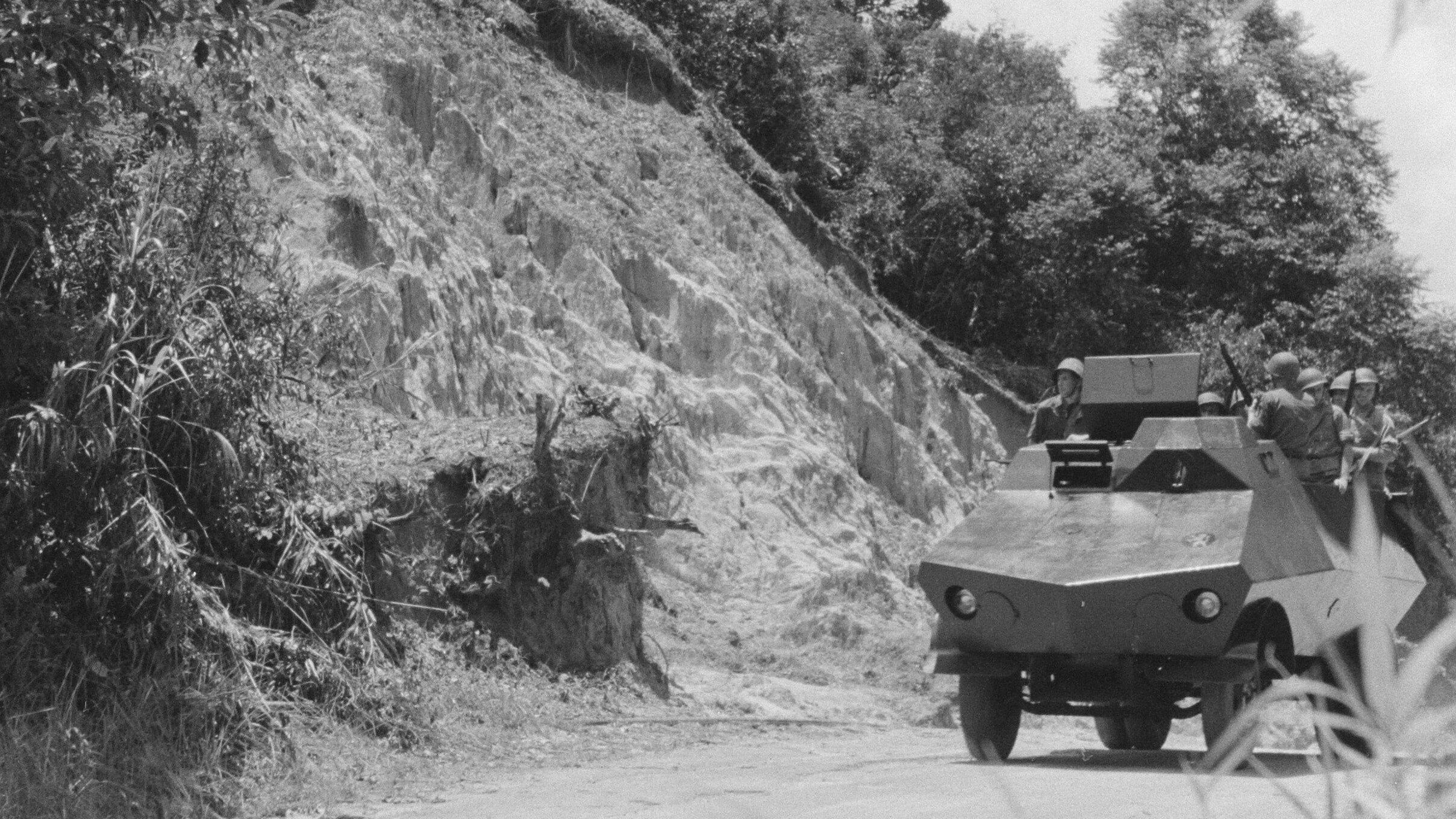
KNIL forces patrolling in Samarinda with Braat Overvalwagen, April 1948.

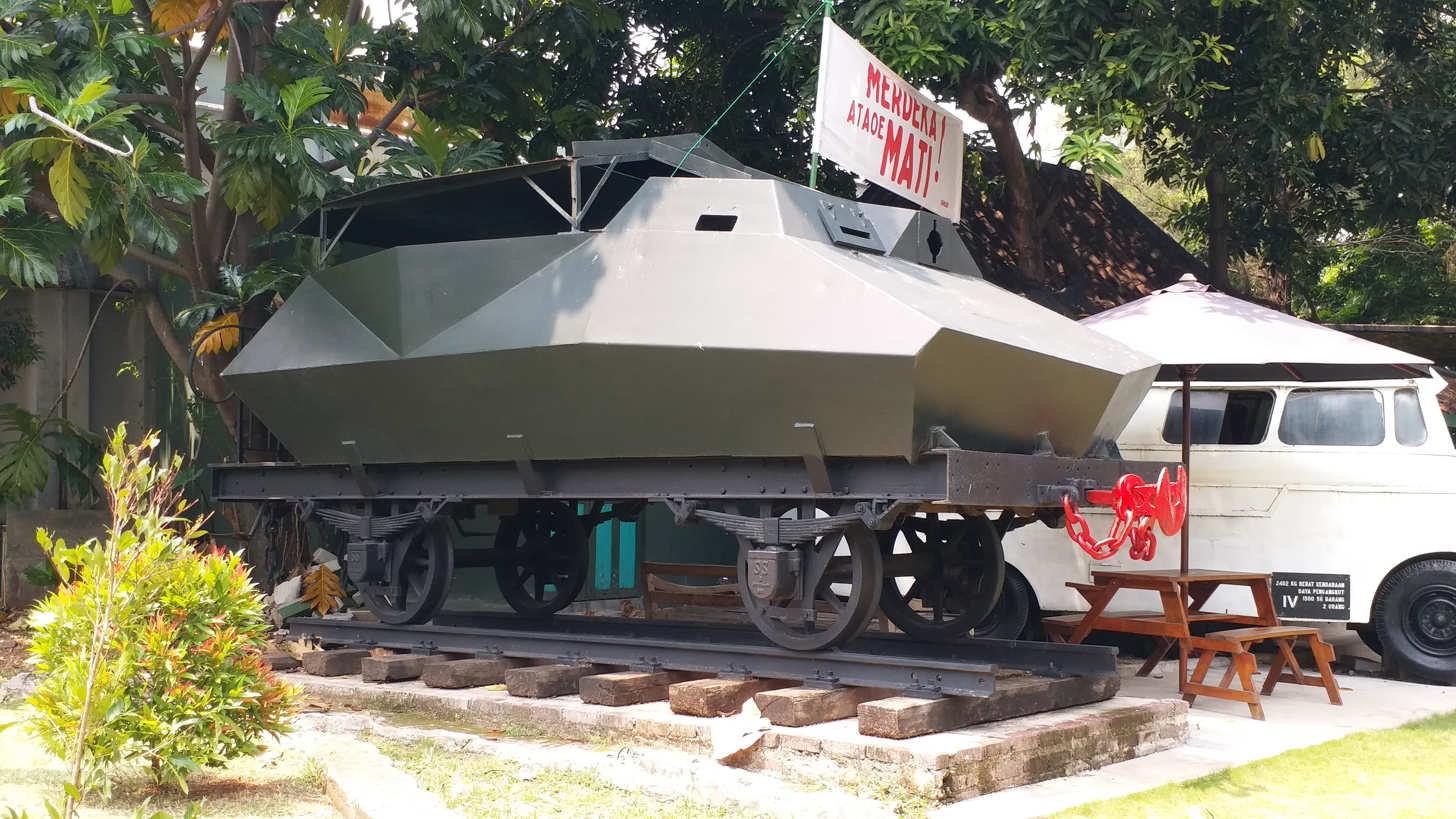
Preserved Overvalwagen armored wagon at the Satriamandala Museum, Jakarta.

== See also ==
- Wilton-Fijenoord Pantserwagen
