= Japanese transport Kumagawa Maru =

World War II-era Japanese ship

History

Empire of Japan
- Name: Nichiyo Maru
- Owner: Toyo Steamship Company Ltd., Tokyo
- Builder: Mitsubishi Shipbuilding & Engineering, Nagasaki
- Laid down: 23 January 1933
- Launched: 5 December 1933
- Completed: 31 March 1934

History

Imperial Japanese Army
- Name: Nichiyo Maru
- Acquired: requisitioned by Imperial Japanese Army, 13 September 1937
- Decommissioned: 1 April 1940
- Renamed: Kumagawa Maru, 17 April 1940

History

Imperial Japanese Navy
- Name: Kumagawa Maru
- Acquired: requisitioned by Imperial Japanese Navy, 27 August 1941

General characteristics
- Type: cargo
- Tonnage: 7,509 GRT 5,521 NRT (1934); 7,510 GRT 5,500 NRT (1940)
- Length: 132.59 m (435.0 ft)
- Beam: 17.83 m (58 ft 6 in)
- Propulsion: Mitsubishi Heavy Industries Diesel, 4,200 bhp

Kumagawa Maru (球磨川丸) was a transport of the Imperial Japanese Navy during World War II. She was initially named Nichiyo Maru (日洋丸).

== History ==
She was laid down on 23 January 1933 at the Nagasaki shipyard of Mitsubishi Shipbuilding & Engineering for the benefit of Toyo Steamship Company Ltd of Tokyo. She was launched on 5 December 1933, completed on 31 March 1934, and given the name Nichiyo Maru. In 1936, she was sold to Taiyo Kogyo Company Ltd. of Tokyo. On 9 December 1936, she was sold to Toyo Kaiun Company Ltd. of Tokyo. On 13 September 1937, she was requisitioned by the Imperial Japanese Army for service in China; she was released from service on 1 April 1940. On 17 April 1940, she was renamed Kumagawa Maru (Her name is also translated as Tamagawa Maru and Shumagawa Maru).

On 27 August 1941, she was requisitioned by the Imperial Japanese Navy and assigned to the Maizuru Naval District with Captain Shiro Yoshida as commanding officer. Her conversion commenced at the Osaka Iron Works and was completed on 1941 October 26. She was assigned to the Second Base Force, Third Fleet. She participated in the invasion of Batan Island, the opening campaign of the invasion of the Philippines, which began simultaneously with the Japanese attack on Pearl Harbor.

On 21 January 1942, she arrived at Tarakan, Dutch Borneo where she formed up with the Balikpapan Invasion Force as part of the greater Dutch East Indies campaign consisting of 16 transports (Kumagawa Maru along with Sumanoura Maru, Tsuruga Maru, Kuretake Maru, Liverpool Maru, Hiteru Maru, Ehime Maru, Havana Maru, Hankow Maru, Teiryu Maru, Asahisan Maru, Nittei Maru, Kanayamasan Maru, Toei Maru, Nana Maru, Nissho Maru) carrying the 56th Mixed Infantry Group of Major General Sakaguchi Shizuo (known as the Sakaguchi Brigade) and the 2nd Kure Special Naval Landing Force.
