= Battle of Balikpapan (1942) =

World War II battle on Borneo

Coordinates: 1°14′46″S 116°49′18″E

- Part of World War II, Pacific War, Dutch East Indies campaign
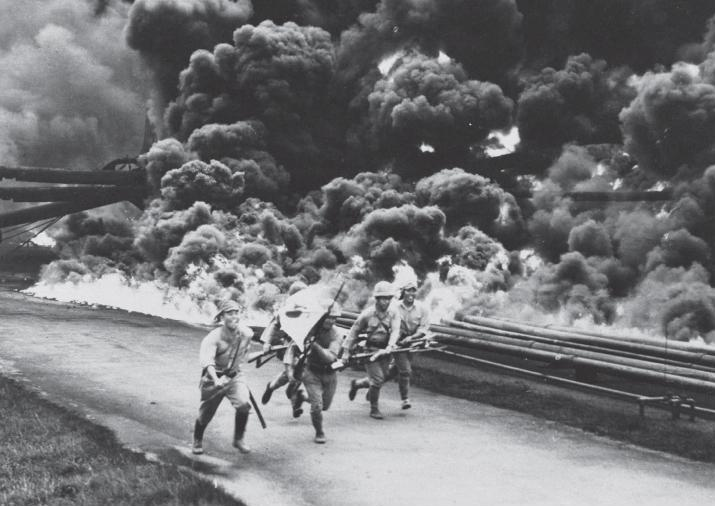
- Japanese troops of the Sakaguchi Detachment advancing through Balikpapan's burning oilfields.
Date	23–25 January 1942 (Allied air raids continued until 30 January)
Location	Balikpapan, Dutch East Indies
Result	Japanese victory

Belligerents
Netherlands; United States	Japan

Commanders and leaders
(Netherlands) Cornelis van den Hoogenband; Paul H. Talbot	(Empire of Japan) Shizuo Sakaguchi (Empire of Japan) Shōji Nishimura

Strength
c. 1,100	c. 6,600

Casualties and losses
Troops deserted or surrendered (Only 200 evacuated); 1 destroyer lightly damaged 1 submarine heavily damaged	47 infantry killed At least 121 sailors killed 5 transport ships sunk 2 transport ships damaged 1 patrol boat damaged 1 seaplane tender damaged

The First Battle of Balikpapan took place on 23–25 January 1942, off the major oil-producing town and port of Balikpapan, on Borneo, in the Netherlands East Indies. After capturing mostly-destroyed oilfields at Tarakan, Japanese forces sent an ultimatum to the Dutch that they would be executed if they destroyed the oilfields there, to no avail.

After destroying the oilfields, Dutch forces retreated inland, taking up positions in and around Samarinda II Airfield, while the Japanese landed and seized the also-destroyed refineries. Shortly thereafter, an American naval task force ambushed the invasion convoy and sank multiple transport ships, but they ultimately failed to stop Japan from swiftly occupying Balikpapan.

== Background ==
Before the war, Balikpapan was a crucial center for Dutch economic enterprises in Borneo. Within the city were two crude oil processing plants, a paraffin and lube oil plant, a cracking plant, a sulfuric acid plant and a precious petroleum refining plant, a tin and drum factory and several workshops. Most importantly, Balikpapan had an oil refinery with a complex of petroleum tanks that could hold eight times as much those at Tarakan, employing up to 7,000 native workers and 100 European employers, who produced up to one millions tons of oil annually before the war.

As the Dutch contemplated the possibility of a Japanese military aggression, they began to bolster defenses to protect the facilities. In 1924, a detachment of six infantry brigades was stationed to defend the oilfields of Balikpapan, as well as those of Semboja and Sanga Sanga (supported by three additional brigades from Samarinda).

Just as the detachment at Tarakan, troops from Java would reinforce the Balikpapan detachment if a threatening situation occurred. In 1933, a battalion staff and two companies were sent to strengthen Balikpapan's defenses, as tensions in the Pacific were rising at the time. After four months, the reinforcement returned to Java. Afterwards, the detachment at Balikpapan was reduced to a single infantry battalion.

In Japan's plan to conquer the Dutch East Indies, Balikpapan held both strategic and tactical significance as a target. Strategically, its oil refinery was vital for Japan's own petroleum production; by occupying it, Japan could have direct access to the large oilfields in Borneo's interior. Tactically, the city also possessed both a harbor and an airfield (Manggar) that would be critical for Japan's occupation of southern Borneo and the capture of Java itself.

== Order of battle ==
=== Japan ===
==== Ground forces ====
Sakaguchi Detachment (Commander: Maj. Gen. Shizuo Sakaguchi)
Raid Unit (Commander: Col. Ken'ichi Kanauji of 2nd Battalion)	Airfield Seizure Unit (Commander: Lt. Col. Motozō Kume of 1st Battalion)	Assault Unit (Commander: Col. Kyōhei Yamamoto of 146th Infantry Regiment)	Other Units
2nd Battalion; (minus 7th Company): One regimental gun squad; Three radio squads; One engineer platoon; One element of the medical unit	1st Battalion; (minus 2nd and 4th Companies): One radio squad; One armored car platoon; (Until the seizure of the airfield): One field artillery battery	146th Infantry Regiment; (minus 1st {minus 4th Company} and 2nd Battalion): 2nd Kure Special Landing Force; Armored car unit (minus one platoon); 1st Field Artillery Battalion (minus one battery); One engineer platoon; One platoon from the Airfield Seizure Unit and the Samboja Seizure Unit each (After capturing the airfield and Samboja respectively)	Samboja Seizure Unit; 2nd Infantry Company (one armored car platoon and one artillery section shall be attached after the seizure of the airfield); Battlefield Resources Salvage Unit

==== Naval forces ====
Western Attack Unit (Commander: Rear. Adm. Shōji Nishimura, based in the cruiser Naka)
4th Destroyer Flotilla (Commander: Rear. Adm. Shōji Nishimura)	Air Group (Commander: Capt. Takamasa Fujisawa)	Base Force (Commander: Rear. Adm. Sueto Hirose, based on the minelayer Itsukushima)
2nd Destroyer Division; (Harusame, Samidare, Yūdachi): 9th Destroyer Division; (Asagumo, Minegumo, Natsugumo): 24th Destroyer Division; (Umikaze, Kawakaze, Yamakaze, Suzukaze): Transport Unit; 1st Echelon: Tsuruga Maru, Liverpool Maru, Hiteru Maru, Kumagawa Maru, Ehime Maru, Asahisan Maru, Nittei Maru and Sumanoura Maru; 2nd Echelon: Havana Maru, Hankow Maru, Teiryu Maru, Kuretake Maru, Kanayama Maru, Toei Maru, Nissho Maru and MS Nana Maru	Seaplane tenders Sanyo Maru and Sanuki Maru	2nd Base Force (P-36, P-37 and P-38); 11th Minesweeper Division (W-15, W-16); 30th Minesweeper Division (W-17, W-18); 21st Submarine-chaser Division (CH-4, CH-16); 31st Submarine-chaser Division (CH-10, CH-11, CH-12)

=== Netherlands ===
Balikpapan Garrison (6th KNIL Infantry Battalion, Commander: Lt. Col. Cornelis van den Hoogenband):
Infantry	Artillery	Other Units
Two infantry companies; (1st and 2nd Company): One machine gun company; (with eight mortars, two anti-tank guns and Three overvalwagen armored cars)	Coastal: 2 x 120 mm L/40 guns; 4 x 75 mm L/35 guns; 2 x 75 mm L/25 guns; Mobile: 6 x 75 mm L/30 guns (transported with trucks); Anti-Aircraft: 2 x 40 mm guns; 9 x 12.7 mm machine guns	A demolition detachment of 20 personnel, supported by ca. 130 conscripted Bataafse Petroleum Maatschappij (BPM; "Batavian Petroleum Company") employees; Five-man medical team, supported by 40 stretcher-bearers

=== United States ===
59th Destroyer Division (Commander: Paul H. Talbot):

- USS John D. Ford
- USS Parrott
- USS Paul Jones
- USS Pope

== Dutch plans ==
The Dutch garrison in Balikpapan was ordered to defend the city, particularly its oil refineries, against a coup de main and to engage in a delaying action to provide time to destroy the facilities. Once it seemed clear that the city was about to fall into enemy hands, the troops would have to wage a guerilla war in the hinterlands. For the facility destruction, the Dutch demolition detachment allotted three hours and eight hours for Balikpapan and Sambodja, respectively. However, a demolition exercise showed that it would take much more time if the destruction was to be carried out according to plan.

For the defensive preparations, van den Hoogenband established a defensive position at Klandasan to block the road from Manggar Airfield to the city. A second defensive line surrounded the radio station (Radio position), with a third line (Rapak position) constructed to cover the retreat into the hinterlands for the guerrilla campaign.

To prevent enemy landings, Dutch Navy (Koninklijke Marine) minelayers Gouden Leeuw, Eland Dubois and Soemenep laid out a barrier of 290 mines around the approaches to Balikpapan Bay between September 1939 and December 1941.

Finally, to prepare for the guerrilla campaign, van den Hoogenband set up evacuation camps that could accommodate about 3,000 people around 6 to 9 km from Balikpapan. Shortly after the fall of Tarakan, he evacuated Balikpapan civilians to these camps. In addition, food depots were also constructed on the river banks every 10 km from the city and near the oil pumping stations in Wain River and Mentawir to sustain the troops during the guerrilla campaign.

== Japanese plans ==
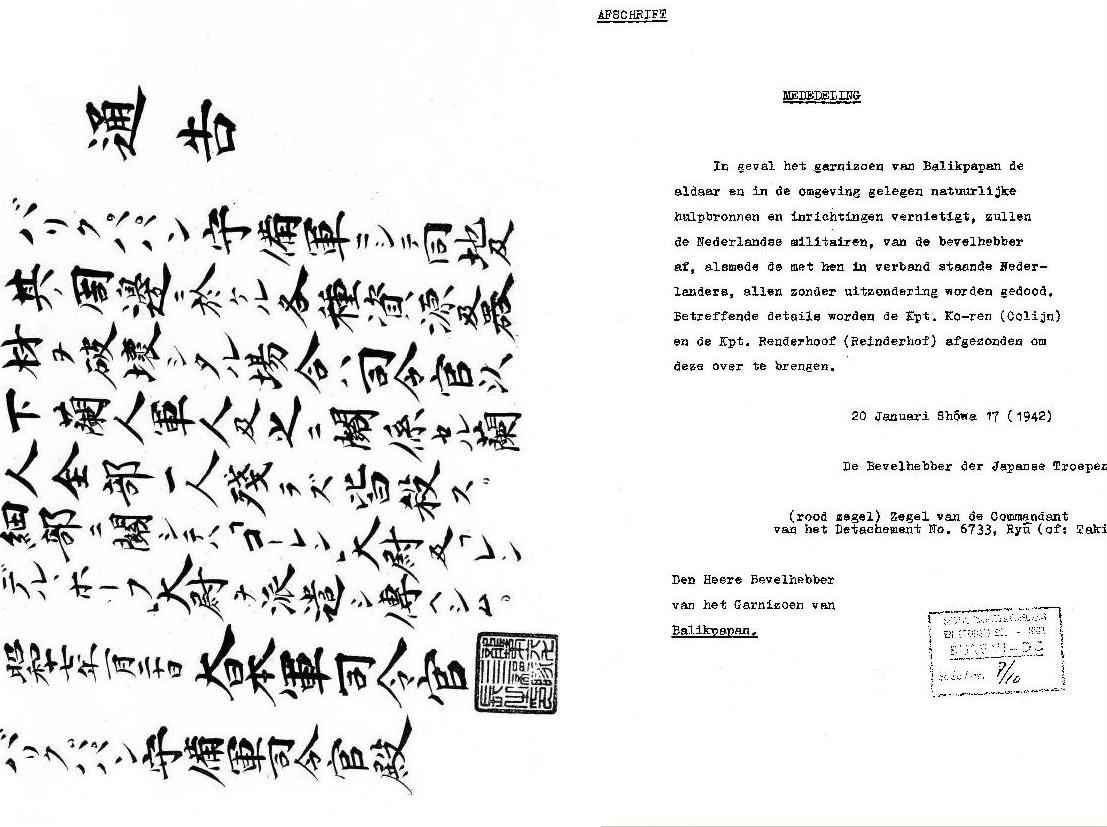
Japanese ultimatum to Dutch forces in Balikpapan. Written in Dutch and Japanese, it stated that all Dutch defenders and civilians will be killed if the facilities in Balikpapan were destroyed.

As the capture of Tarakan went faster than their predicted timetable, the Sakaguchi Detachment and Western Attack Unit moved up their date to occupy Balikpapan. Their orders were:

1. The enemy will be contacted and destroyed while every possible effort will be exerted to prevent destruction of the oil refinery installations. The airfield, after its capture, will be used for the invasion of Java. The assault unit will cooperate in the maintenance of the airfield.
2. The main force immediately upon landing in the vicinity of the airfield will capture it. Simultaneously, a part of the group will secretly go up the river below the port and make a surprise attack at the enemy's rear in order to break the organized resistance of the enemy garrison. As far as possible, they will prevent the destruction of the oil refinery installations.
3. After the capture of the Balikpapan, the Sanga Sanga Oilfield region will be mopped up and secured.
4. Preparations will be made to make Balikpapan the center of military administration in South Borneo.

Despite being already ahead of schedule, the debarkation and construction activity to ensure the readiness of Tarakan airfield made little progress. Delaying the airfield's capacity to be used a staging ground for the attack on Balikpapan, Nishimura and Sakaguchi eventually postponed the landing in Balikpapan from 21 January to 24 January. Still, as the postponement did not provide enough time to ready the Tarakan airfield for transport planes, the plan to attack Balikpapan using paratroopers were scrapped.

Concerned that the Dutch defenders intended to destroy the oilfields in Balikpapan, the Japanese planned to release several Dutch POWs with a warning that swift reprisal would fall on defenders and civilians alike should they destroy the refineries.

== Battle ==
=== Ultimatum and demolition (16–20 January) ===
To carry the aforementioned ultimatum to the defenders, Sakaguchi tasked Capt. Gerard Reinderhoff, former chief of staff to the Tarakan garrison commander, Lt.-Col. Simon de Waal and Capt. Anton Colijn, manager of the BPM oil company on Tarakan, KNIL reservist and son to the former Dutch prime minister Hendrikus Colijn. On the morning of 16 January, they steamed to Balikpapan aboard the captured BPM motor schooner Parsifal with an Indonesian captain and three Japanese interpreters (other sources say two Japanese naval lieutenants and two sailors; others mentioned three Japanese interpreters and two Indonesian police officers).

Two Dornier Do 24 seaplanes of MLD's GVT.4 Squadron sighted Parsifal, flying a Japanese flag on 19 January. Differing sources indicate that Colijn and Reinderhoff either overpowered or deceived their captors — some accounts claim the Japanese were drunk — and managed to lock them inside a cabin. Colijn then immediately tore down the Japanese ensign, while Reinderhoff waved a Dutch flag. As the seas were too rough for a landing, the Dorniers flew off and returned the next day. The Dorniers returned and landed the following morning, picked up Colijn and Reinderhoff and flew them to Balikpapan, where they delivered the ultimatum directly to van den Hoogenband.

Van den Hoogenband wasted no time and immediately gave the order for the demolition team to began destroying all the wells, refineries and port facilities in Balikpapan. The destruction had actually already begun ahead of schedule on 18 January. In the Louise oilfields located north of Balikpapan, Dutch demolition teams dismantled the well tubing, cut off to a depth of 15 meters, which were then dropped down the holes together with pump plungers and accessory rods. To complete the work, materials such as bolts, nuts, and heavy drilling bits was thrown after them. Finally, a tin containing four pieces of TNT was thrown in to destroy the casing strings. Within a few days "all motors, pumps, dynamos and turbines were blown up."

At Balikpapan proper, stills and steam boilers were first wrecked, which took about a day and a half; about thirty hours of "heavy stoking" were required to collapse the shells of the stills, after which the teams destroyed the boilers for five to eight hours. The destruction of the installations then continued throughout the region and at the port itself. First, the teams set fire to the wharves by encircling the channels with burning oil from ignited gasoline drums. They then blew up the factories; the paraffin-wax factory, the packed lubricating-oil drum store, the saltwater pumping station were all dynamited. A newly constructed tin plant in the Pandansari factory was also burned down. The destruction efforts ended with the obliteration of laboratories, tank farms, and the power station, with chains of explosions shattering windows throughout the town. By nightfall on 20 January, the blaze from the destructions could be seen over 100 km away.

=== Evacuation (20–23 January) ===
From mid-January 1942, BPM personnel and civilians still left behind began to be airlifted out of Balikpapan. After the fall of Tarakan, three Lockheed Lodestars from the ML-KNIL and a DC-2 from the KNILM were stationed at Surabaya to carry out resupply and evacuation flights. Hundreds of evacuees were flown to Surabaya from Manggar Airfield, as well as Oelin Airfield near Banjarmasin. From January 20, however, evacuations from the city were only possible by flying boats. To avoid reprisals, BPM and KNIL engineers who carried out the demolition, as well as Colijn and Reinderhoff, were also evacuated. On the night of 20 January, the two officers, along with 25 other evacuees, left for Java. At the same time, BPM sent out a Grumman Goose to evacuate their company officials and employees, the last one done on 23 January.

On that night, MLD also began their evacuation runs, starting with the two Dorniers of GVT.4 Squadron that made back and forth trips between Balikpapan and Surabaya. They evacuated the city port's naval commander and his personnel, as well as demolition teams who had destroyed the Samboja drilling site. On the next run on 22 January, two additional Dorniers joined the convoy, but only two made the landing on Wain River and evacuated 58 BPM members of the demolition team and the remaining MLD ground personnel. Despite the bad weather and fuel concerns, the planes managed to land in Surabaya. Of the two other Dorniers, one had to return because of the bad weather, while the other one crashed and exploded while trying to land on Sungai Wain, killing four of the five flight crew. Throughout the evacuation, blazing fires from the town helped to guide the planes in, as they were visible a full hour's flight time away.

The rest of the demolition team, 87 Europeans and 10 Indonesians from BPM and other companies, aided by 140 Indonesian porters, marched to Banjarmasin. When Japanese troops cut off the route, the porters ran off and the team decided to split into smaller groups that would try to reach Samarinda II at their own pace. The largest of the groups eventually reached the airfield at the end of February and were evacuated to Java and another group reached the airfield on 8 March, when the Netherlands capitulated. From the rest of the small groups, several reached Banjarmasin using perahus (boat), two groups reached Java after capitulation and one reached Lombok. Yet there were also those who were captured and killed by Japanese troops. In all, out of the 87 Europeans, 41 survived.

=== Fleet interception (21–23 January) ===
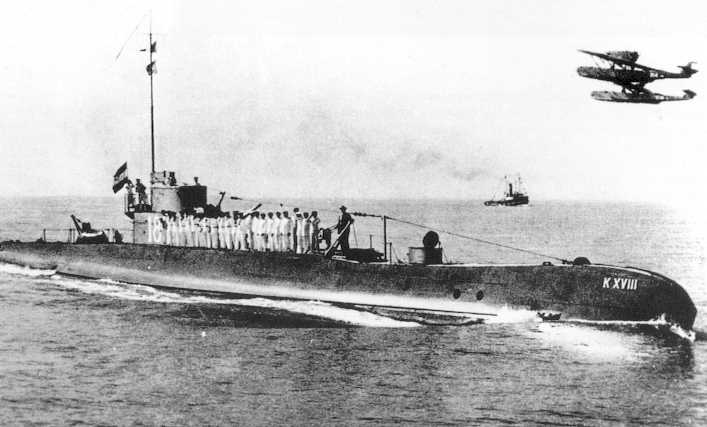
Dutch submarine K XVIII

At 17:00 on the 21 January, the Japanese invasion fleet of one light cruiser, ten destroyers, four minesweepers, three submarine chasers, three patrol boats and sixteen transport ships left Tarakan for Balikpapan. A MLD Dornier spotted the fleet that same day, but heavy clouds with strong winds and prolonged rain prevented the plane from shadowing the fleet. On the next day, U.S. Navy submarines S-40, Pickerel, Porpoise, Saury, Spearfish and Sturgeon were ordered to intercept the fleet. Later, they were joined by Dutch submarines K XIV and K XVIII. Sturgeon fired several torpedoes on the convoy and reported sinking three ships. However, postwar records failed to confirm any damages to the convoy.

On 23 January, an American PBY Catalina seaplane from Patrol Wing 10 spotted the fleet at 12:20 and shadowed it for an hour. From 16:25, as many as three waves of Dutch Martin B-10 bombers (19 in total) escorted by up to 12 Brewster Buffalo fighters attacked the fleet. The first and second wave scored no hits, and many were forced to return due to bad weather. On the third wave, the Dutch planes narrowly struck the Kawakaze, lightly damaged the transport ship Tatsugami Maru, and sank the transport ship Nana Maru, for the cost of a Martin bomber shot down.

Despite these attacks, at 22:30 the Japanese began their landing on Balikpapan as Col. Kanauji's Raid Unit disembarked and made their way through the bay to land behind van den Hoogenband's defense lines. Later at 01:40 on 24 January, Gen. Sakaguchi's Airfield Seizure Unit and Assault Unit embarked on their landing craft and also began making their way to the beaches.

=== Land engagement (23–25 January) ===
Around midnight, reports reached van den Hoogenband of craft movements in Balikpapan Bay, heading towards the Klandasan position. Dense smoke from the burning facilities made it difficult for Dutch searchlights to observe the water front ahead of them, enabling Kanauji's Raid Unit to sail unhindered into Wain River behind the Dutch lines. A Dutch patrol soon reported this movement to van den Hoogenband, who ordered 2nd Company to secure the Dutch 120 mm guns and sent out overvalwagen armored cars to patrol and report for any enemy troop activities in their inland retreat route. At 03:30 on the 24th, the Raid Unit entered the mouth of the Wain River, where they were greeted by two Indonesian police officers who guided them inland.

At daybreak, 2nd Company reported that they managed to prevent Kanauji from reaching Balikpapan and threatening their retreat route. Yet at 06:30, van den Hoogenband received reports of Japanese troops advancing east towards their defensive lines, and by 07:00, Japanese troops were nearing the Klandasan position. With little reserve at his disposal, van den Hoogenband was left to choose on whether he should reinforce the Klandasan position, or attempt a break out through the Raid Unit and retreat inland. As there was little merit in defending a ruined city, van den Hoogenband chose to do the latter. He informed the General Headquarters in Bandung of his decision and ordered his troops to destroy the guns, searchlights and radio station and bolster the rear defenses for the breakout. 2nd Company was now ordered to go on the offensive and capture and hold the Wain River pumping station to enable the rest of the forces to retreat. Later, even though there were no reports from them, van den Hoogenband was under the impression that 2nd Company managed to hold the pumping station and that the overvalwagen patrols had kept the retreat routes safe from Japanese troops. At 09:00, he assembled his troops and their families, 700 in all in about 100 trucks and other vehicles. Led by an overvalwagen, they began their breakout push inland and retreated to Batoehampar (Batu Ampar).

Kanauji's forces eventually landed at 17:30 that day. On the 25th, the Raid Unit split up, with one element advancing to seize the pumping station, another advancing toward Balikpapan, and the rest of the main force moving up on the road between Batu Ampar and Balikpapan. At 14:40, when the main force advanced into Batu Ampar, they defeated a Dutch force (unknown, either 2nd Company or parts of van den Hoogenband's column) and taking them prisoner, effectively cutting off any line of retreat inland.

Earlier, at 02:40 on the 24th, the Airfield Seizure and Assault Units landed without meeting any resistance and by daybreak, they seized the airfield and the bridges. Even though van den Hoogenband's troops had destroyed the bridges on the coastal road, Yamamoto's troops managed to reach the north end of Balikpapan by night. By 04:00 on the 25th, the Assault Unit entered Balikpapan unopposed. After nightfall, the Raid Unit managed to link up with the Assault Unit when they entered the city, and with it, Balikpapan was in Japanese hands.

=== Naval engagement (24 January) ===
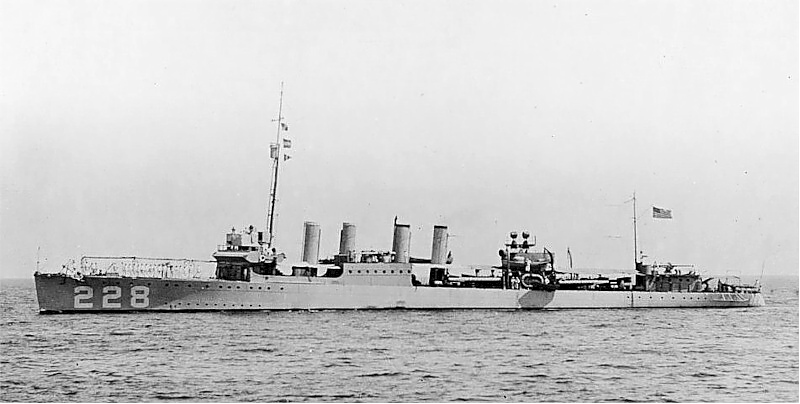
USS John D. Ford, with Commander Paul H. Talbot on board, led the night attack on the Japanese transports on Balikpapan.

As Japanese forces embarked onto their landing craft and made their way to Balikpapan, Dutch submarine HNLMS K XVIII, under Lieutenant Commander Carel A.J. van Well Groeneveld, made contact with the Balikpapan invasion convoy. At 00:35, van Well Groenveld fired three torpedoes on what he reported to be a "1,400-ton destroyer", which was actually the cruiser Naka. After all the torpedoes missed Naka, the submarine fired another torpedo that hit and sank the transport ship Tsuruga Maru between 00:40 and 00:45, taking one crewmember and 39 troops of the Sakaguchi Detachment down with it.

As Naka and the 4th Destroyer Flotilla left the convoy to hunt for K XVIII, they opened the path for the American 59th Destroyer Division to attack the now unguarded transport convoy. Admiral Thomas Hart, commander of the U.S. Navy's Asiatic Fleet, assembled a strike force designated Task Force 5 (TF 5) that sailed from Koepang (Kupang) Bay, Timor on 20 January. Commanded by Admiral William Glassford and Paul Talbot, it consisted of the cruisers Boise and Marblehead and the destroyers John D. Ford, Pope, Parrott, Paul Jones, Pillsbury, and Bulmer. Glassford served as the overall commander, while Talbot led the destroyers.

At that time, Marblehead had only one working turbine, which limited its speed to 15 knots. On 21 January, Boise struck an uncharted reef off Kelapa Island in Sape Strait that caused a 120-ft long gash in the ship's port keel. Along with Marblehead, the two cruisers were forced to retire to Waworada Bay under the escort of Bulmer and Pillsbury. From there, Boise and Pillsbury headed back to Tjilatjap (Cilacap), while Marblehead and Bulmer steamed towards Surabaya. The remaining four destroyers under Commander Talbot went on towards Balikpapan.

To maintain the element of surprise, Talbot ordered his destroyers to use their torpedoes as their primary attack weapon for that night and only fire their guns when these were expended. Guided by the burning wreck of Nana Maru and Balikpapan's blazing fires, TF 5 entered the Makassar Strait just after midnight on 24 January. At 02:35, they ran straight into the path of the cruiser Naka and four destroyers. One of the destroyers signaled a challenge, to no reply from Talbot's ships. Assuming that they were friendly ships, the Japanese destroyers passed TF 5 without raising any alarm.

Ten minutes later, Talbot spotted the Japanese transport fleet, silhouetted by fire from the burning oilfields behind them and guarded by three patrol boats, four minesweepers, and four submarine chasers. At 02:57, W-15 spotted the destroyers, but assumed that it was Naka. Parrott, followed by John D. Ford and Paul Jones, fired a total of seven torpedoes at the minesweeper, but all missed due to poor angle. As they reached the northern end of the transport fleet, Parrott fired three torpedoes at 03:00, hitting Sumanoura Maru and caused a tremendous explosion that sank the ship, as it was carrying depth charges and mines at the time.

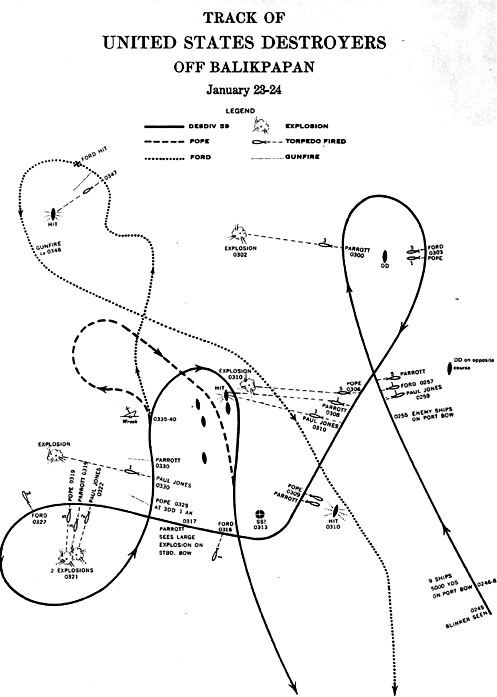
TF 5's attack on Japanese transports off of Balikpapan.

Soon afterwards, W-15 alerted Admiral Nishimura that the transport fleet was under attack. Despite the alarm, he refused to believe that enemy ships could penetrate the anchorage and assumed that the attack must be coming from K XVIII. In the midst of the newly created confusion, Pope, Parrott and Paul Jones fired a total of 10 torpedoes at 03:06, one of which hit the Tatsugami Maru. Compounded by damage from the Dutch air raid the previous day, the munition-loaded ship exploded and sank 30 minutes later. Talbot then turned TF 5 southward at 03:14, aiming to attack the southern end of the fleet.

Five minutes later, Pope and Parrott fired five torpedoes at what they assumed was a destroyer, but was actually the patrol boat P-37. The former World War I destroyer received three torpedo hits that badly damaged the vessel and killed 35 of its crew. John D. Ford and Paul Jones followed on with an attack on the Kuretake Maru, but it managed to evade the first two torpedoes. A second torpedo from Paul Jones then hit amidships and the transport ship soon sank. Pope, Parrott, and Paul Jones now signaled Talbot that they'd used all their torpedoes, and he authorized them to use their 4-inch guns on the transports.

At this time, however, TF 5's formation began to break up. John D. Ford went on a northwesterly course at 03:35, followed shortly by Pope. John D. Ford then fired its last two torpedoes on the wreck of Tsuruga Maru, before attacking Kumagawa Maru and Asahisan Maru concurrently. Shells from its 4-inch guns and .50 caliber machine guns riddled both ships, killing 6 crewmembers in Kumagawa Maru and 50 in Asahisan Maru. As it did so, however, a shell hit aft on John D. Ford at 03:47, wounding four of her crew. Avoiding running aground in shoal waters, the commander of the destroyer, Lt. Cmdr. Jacob D. Cooper, made a port turn and doubled back to catch up with the rest of TF 5, who were already steaming away from Balikpapan Bay. John D. Ford only managed to catch up with the rest of TF 5 at 06:42, upon which Talbot ordered a signal flag hoisted on the destroyer: WELL DONE.

By then, Admiral Nishimura and the 4th Flotilla was still on a wild-goose chase after K XVIII nearly six to seven kilometers away (three to four miles). It was not until 05:20 when he finally ordered the 9th Destroyer Division to cut off TF 5's escape route. However, because none of them had knowledge of where the American ships were, Nishimura eventually ordered the destroyers of the 9th to resume their previous task. As his flagship Naka sailed into the anchorage to ascertain the condition of the transports, it was separated from the 9th Division and rejoined the transport echelons alone.

=== Retreat into Samarinda II (24 January – 6 February) ===
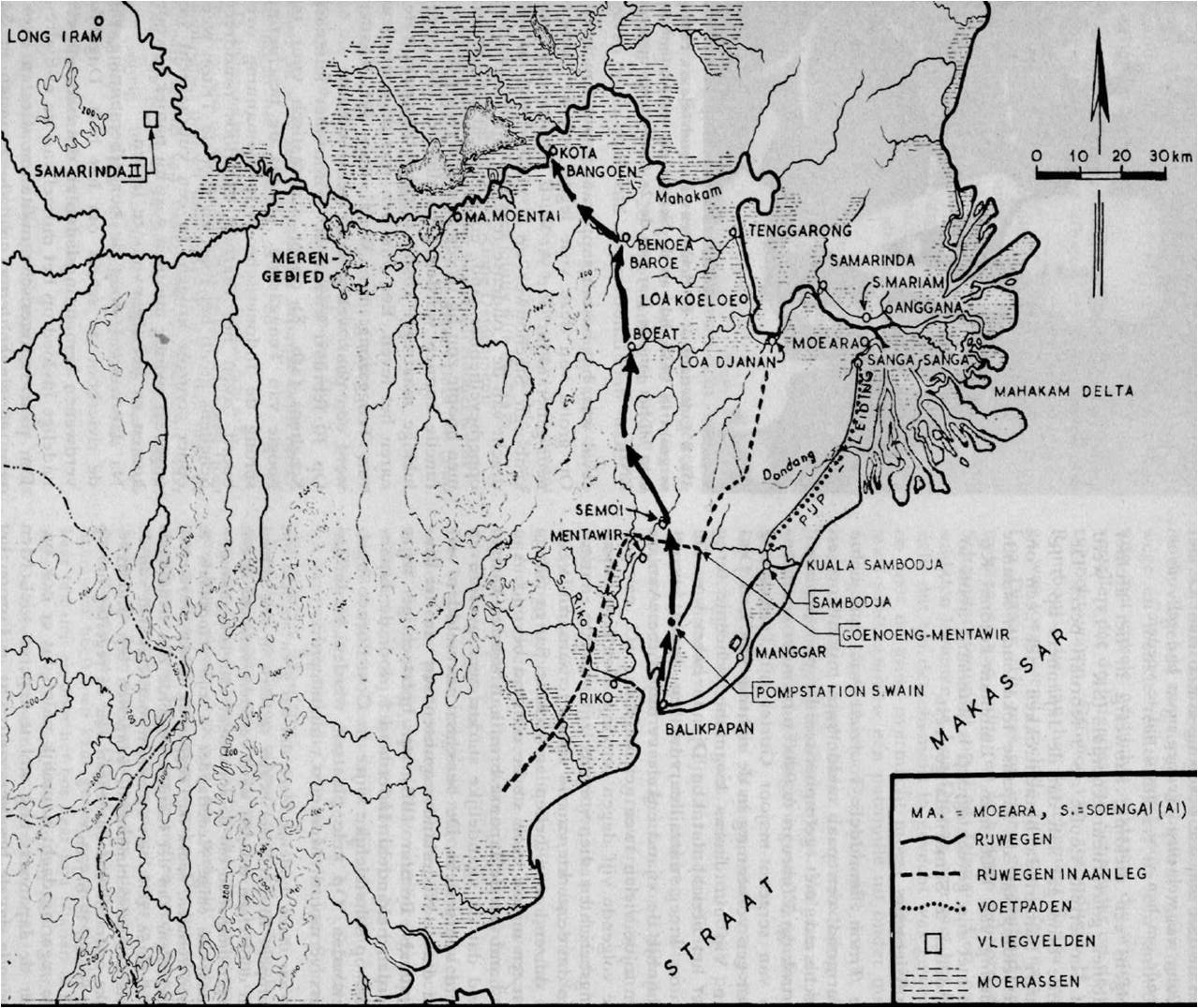
Dutch retreat route from Balikpapan to Samarinda II.

Upon reaching Batu Ampar, van den Hoogenband realized that Japanese troops had occupied defensive points leading into the pumping station. His forces now had to retreat through the evacuation camps, upon which several hundred women and children, mostly families of the Indonesian soldiers, joined his column. On 25 January, they received report that the Wain River pumping station was already under Japanese control.

Considering that his troops were too fatigued by now, van den Hoogenband refrained from attacking the pumping station and persuaded the women and children to return to Balikpapan, as there was better chance there to obtain food. Part of them went back to the evacuation camp, while others remained in the kampungs (villages) around Wain River. The remainder of 500 soldiers continued the retreat north.

Throughout the retreat, Dutch troops encountered difficulties in replenishing their equipment and obtaining food, as most of the food depots had been taken over by Japanese forces. It was not until they reached the road between Mentawir and Semoi that they managed to find rice stores in a labor camp. On 3 February, the column reached the Boeat (Buat) kampung, where they obtained more provisions, as well as additional intelligence. Local officials informed van den Hoogenband that Japanese troops had occupied Samarinda city that same day, but the Samarinda II airfield was still under Dutch control.

Advised by the officials, the Dutch column now retreated into Kota Bangoen (Kota Bangun), where there were transport ships that could take them along the Mahakam River into Samarinda II. The sick from the column were moved using wooden boats (perahu) directly from Buat downstream to the Mahakam. After three days of marching, van den Hoogenband and 200 soldiers reached Kota Bangun on 5 February and arrived at Samarinda II the next day. From 7 to 8 February, they were flown to Java, though some infantrymen from the column ended up reinforcing the garrison defending the airfield.

=== Allied air attacks on Balikpapan (24–30 January) ===
==== 24 January ====
During and after the occupation of Balikpapan, aircraft of the ABDA Air Force, mainly those of the Dutch, launched daily air raids from the Samarinda II airfield to help destabilize, if not dislodge Japanese forces. On 24 January, the first wave struck Japanese forces at 07:15. This attack consisted of 10 Martin B-10 bombers of the 1-VLG-I Squadron, escorted by 14 Buffalos of the 1-VLG-V and 2-VLG-V Squadrons. Despite heavy Japanese AA fire, no Dutch planes were shot down. Dutch pilots claimed that they sank a transport ship, damaged another one and struck the destroyer Kawakaze again. Yet Japanese reports showed that the attack failed to damage or sink a single ship.

At approximately 08:00, three Japanese Navy Zeros operating out of Tarakan conducted a strafing run over Samarinda II airfield. A KNILM DC-3 with three BPM evacuees onboard was straddled but managed to crash land in the jungle. A group of Dayak people and a missionary later saved them, though one of the BPM evacuee died of his injury beforehand. Dutch AA fire from the airfield shot down a Zero that crashed intact, thus enabling Dutch forces to obtain intelligence on the fighter's strengths and weaknesses.

Between 09:00 and 09:50, eight B-17 Flying Fortresses of the U.S. 7th and 19th Bomb Group that had departed from Malang attacked the ships at anchor. The B-17s shot down two Zeros who intercepted the formation, for a cost of three bombers slightly damaged and no hits scored. Later in the afternoon, 14 Buffalos of 1-VLG-V Squadron followed by 10 Martin B-10s flew out of Samarinda II to scout and bombard Japanese troop positions. Thick clouds and Japanese AA fire scattered the formations and the attack scored no hits, but they managed to shoot down two Mitsubishi F1M 'Pete' scout planes. When the attack wave landed at 15:30, six Zeros and a Babs caught them in a second raid. Three Zeros strafed and destroyed three Martin B-10s. Three Buffalos of 1-VLG-V attempted to dislodge the fighters, but the Zeros shot down two of them. One Zero was eventually badly damaged by AA fire and ditched in the sea.

==== 25 January ====
On the next day, the attack started with the deployment of nine Martin B-10s of the 1-VLG-I Squadron. Once again, bad weather scattered the formation. When the bombers reached Balikpapan at 08:00, they were immediately engaged by four Zeros. In a 25-minute aerial battle, the Zeros shot down one Martin and damaged three other, while losing one to the bomber's defensive fire. The remaining bombers then were moved to Oelin Airfield in Banjarmasin.

The Dutch also sent six Buffalos of 2-VLG-V Squadron for armed reconnaissance around Balikpapan. The flight yielded no results as the heavy smoke layers and dense rain obscured the pilots' vision. As soon as the Buffalos returned around 09:30, 27 Mitsubishi G4M 'Betty' bombers bombarded Samarinda II from a height of 21,000 ft (6,400 m), making them impervious to Dutch AA defenses. Three Buffalos took off and attempted to intercept them, but did not damage or shoot down any bombers. The raid rendered Samarinda II's runways partially unusable and damaged two Buffalos. Later, at 15:30, four Zeros and a Babs strafed the airfield and destroyed a Martin and a Buffalo.

The Americans followed up on this attack by sending eight B-17s of the 7th and 19th Bomb Group at 11:00. Bad weather forced four of them to turn back to Malang along the way, with three of the four eventually making emergency landings on the beach of Madura Island due to lack of fuel. Meeting the same fate as the Dutch planes before them, the remaining Flying Fortresses were promptly intercepted by Japanese Zeros. The B-17 defenses managed to shoot down two of them, but one of the four B-17s was so badly damaged that it had to made an emergency landing at Oelin. By the end of the day, the attacks failed to generate any damages or losses to the Japanese fleet.

==== 27 January ====
The next raid took place two days later, as heavy cloud cover had been preventing both the Japanese and the Allies from launching any attacks at all. Beforehand, ML-KNIL withdrew a majority of their Martin-B10s and Buffalos from Borneo between 25 and 27 January, as the Japanese discovery of Samarinda II had rendered it useless as an effective airfield. The Martins were withdrawn to Makassar on 25 January, from there they flew for Bandoeng (Bandung) on the next day. The Buffalos, on the other hand, retreated to Banjarmasin before flying to Surabaya. On 26 January, ABDAIR Command ordered the ML-KNIL and USAAF's 5th Bomber Command to continue their bombing raids against Balikpapan. On the 27th, 7th and 19th Bomb Group sent out six Flying Fortresses from Malang. Even though one of them had to turn back due to bad weather, at 13:00 the bombers scored hits on the seaplane tender Sanuki Maru, forcing it to withdraw to the Makassar Strait.

At around the same time, six Zeros and a Babs from Tarakan raided the fleet of Martin B-10s at Oelin that were still assigned to continue the attacks on Balikpapan. Dutch attempts to shoot down the raiders with their Lewis guns and medium machine guns failed, and all six Martins of the 3-VLG-III Squadron were destroyed. In addition, three other Martins of the 1-VLG-I Squadron were also heavily damaged. Because of this loss, the ABDAIR could solely depend on the Americans and their heavy bombers to continue the mission.

==== 29 January ====
Two days later, five Flying Fortresses made another run on the Japanese fleet. One of the bombers returned while en route, while the remaining four were attacked by 13 Zeros for 30 minutes over Balikpapan. One B-17 crashed on the return flight due to its damage. The Americans believed that they managed to shoot down six Zeros, but Japanese records indicated that only one was shot down, while another one was damaged on landing at Manggar Airfield.

==== 30 January ====
The day after, the 19th Bomb Group conducted two separate raids, neither of which inflicted any damage. The first raid during the day by three B-17 did not succeed, as all three bombers had to turn back en route due to bad weather and engine failure. Later that night, two LB-30 bombers attacked the fleet individually, about an hour apart, to no avail. This night attack was the last Allied attempt to stem the Japanese fleet advance in the context of the battle of Balikpapan.

== Aftermath ==
After completed occupying Balikpapan's urban area the previous day, the Sakaguchi Detachment began mopping up any remaining Dutch resistance and setting up Manggar Airfield on 26 January. Although the Dutch had thoroughly destroyed the refineries and other supporting facilities, Japanese defense details managed to repair the oilfields and kept them running from June 1942 until August 1943, when the first Allied air raids began bombarding them once more. With a high octane rating, the Balikpapan refinery was greatly utilized in supporting Japanese military operations in the southwestern Pacific theater. Manggar Airfield was repaired on 27 January and on the next day, nine Zeros of the 23rd Air Flotilla landed there, and it established its headquarters on the airfield by the 30th. The Sakaguchi Detachment also placed its main force and established a military administration in the city.

=== Casualties ===
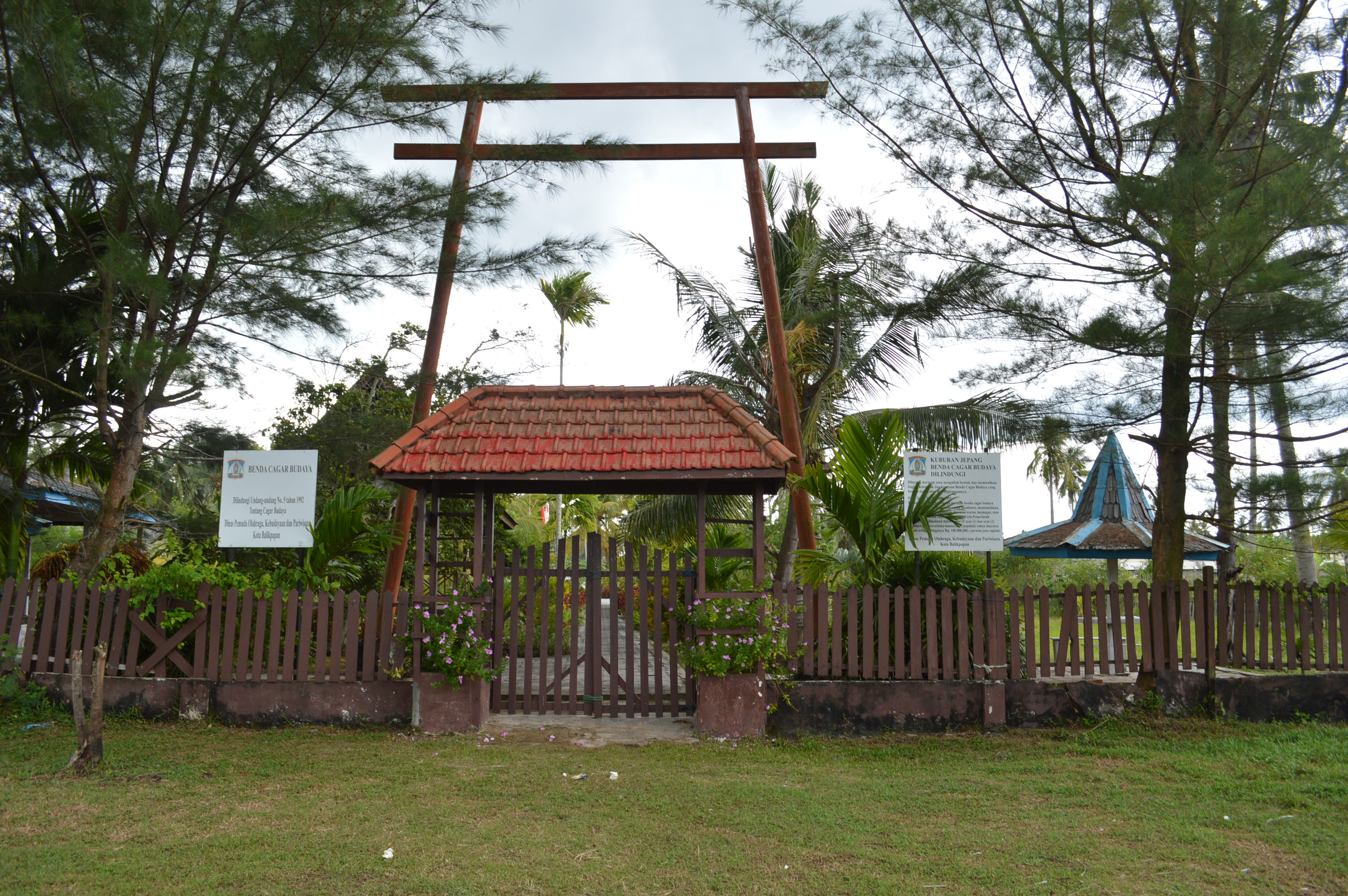
A Torii still stands today on a Japanese Army Cemetery in Balikpapan

In all, the loss sustained by the Sakaguchi Detachment in the operation was eight men killed on land and 39 at sea (when Tsuruga Maru sank). For the Japanese Navy, at least 121 naval crewmen perished. In all, the Japanese material losses were (brackets indicate ship's cargo):

Sunk:

- Nana Maru (Aviation fuel)
- Tsuruga Maru (Field Artillery Battalion headquarters, one field artillery battery, the Anti-Aircraft Battalion headquarters, one anti-aircraft battery, medical unit)
- Sumanoura Maru (Mines and depth charges)
- Tatsugami Maru (Munitions)
- Kuretake Maru (3rd Battalion headquarters, the 12th Company, the 3rd Machine Gun Company)

Badly damaged:

- Patrol boat P-37
- Asahisan Maru

Slightly damaged:

- Kumagawa Maru
- Sanuki Maru

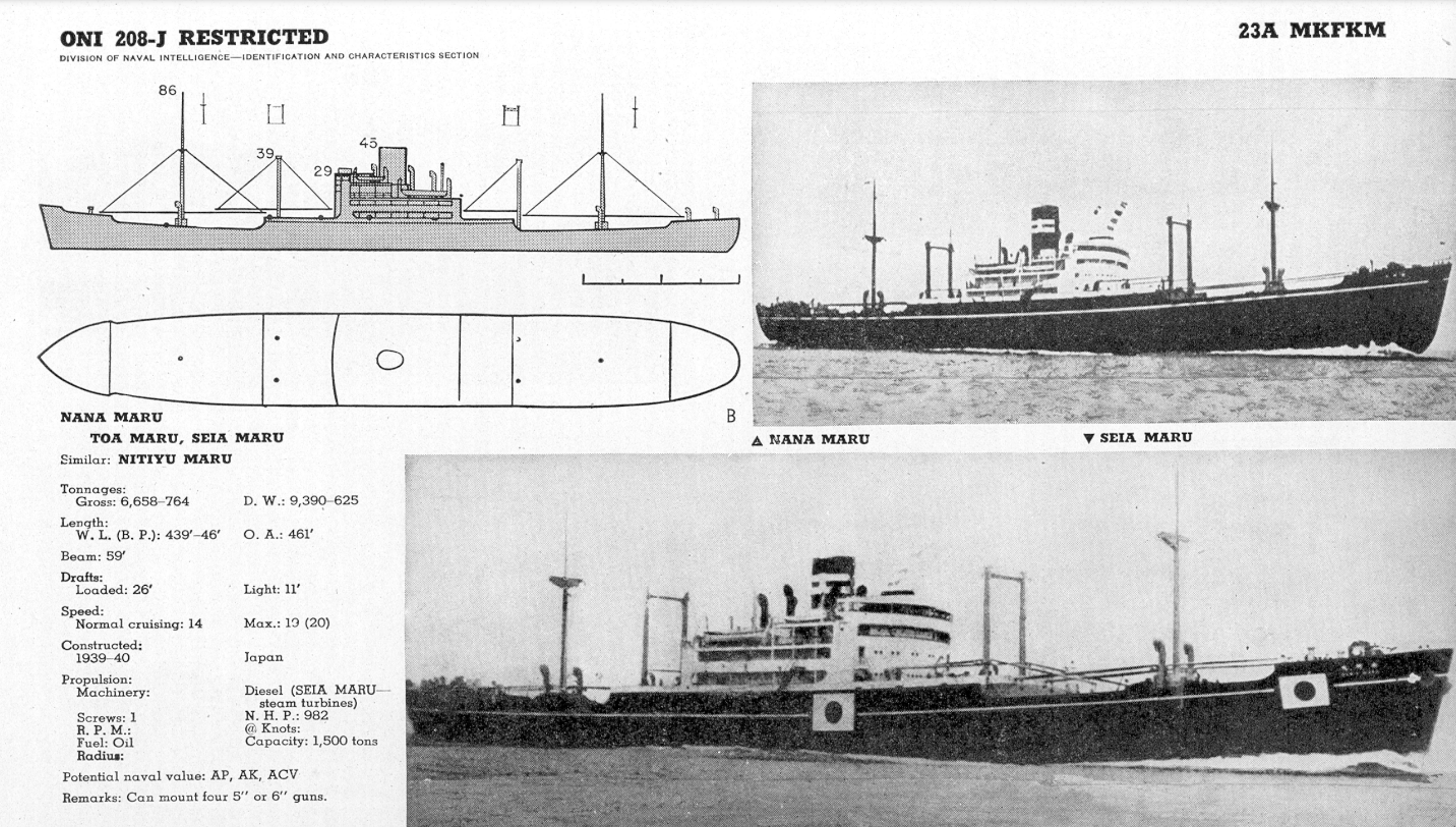
Nana Maru, on the top right.

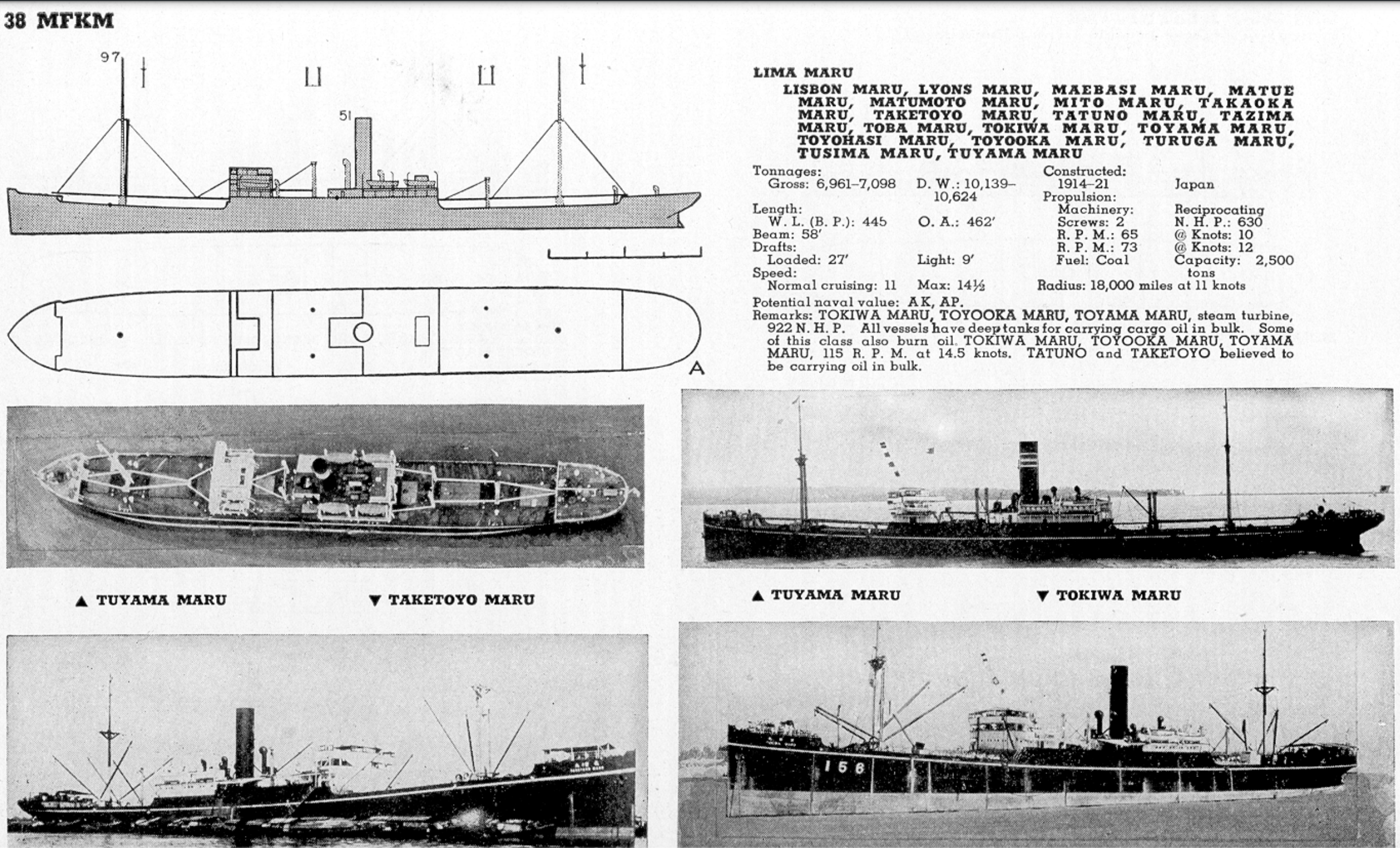
Tsuruga (Turuga) Maru, part of Lima Maru-class ships.

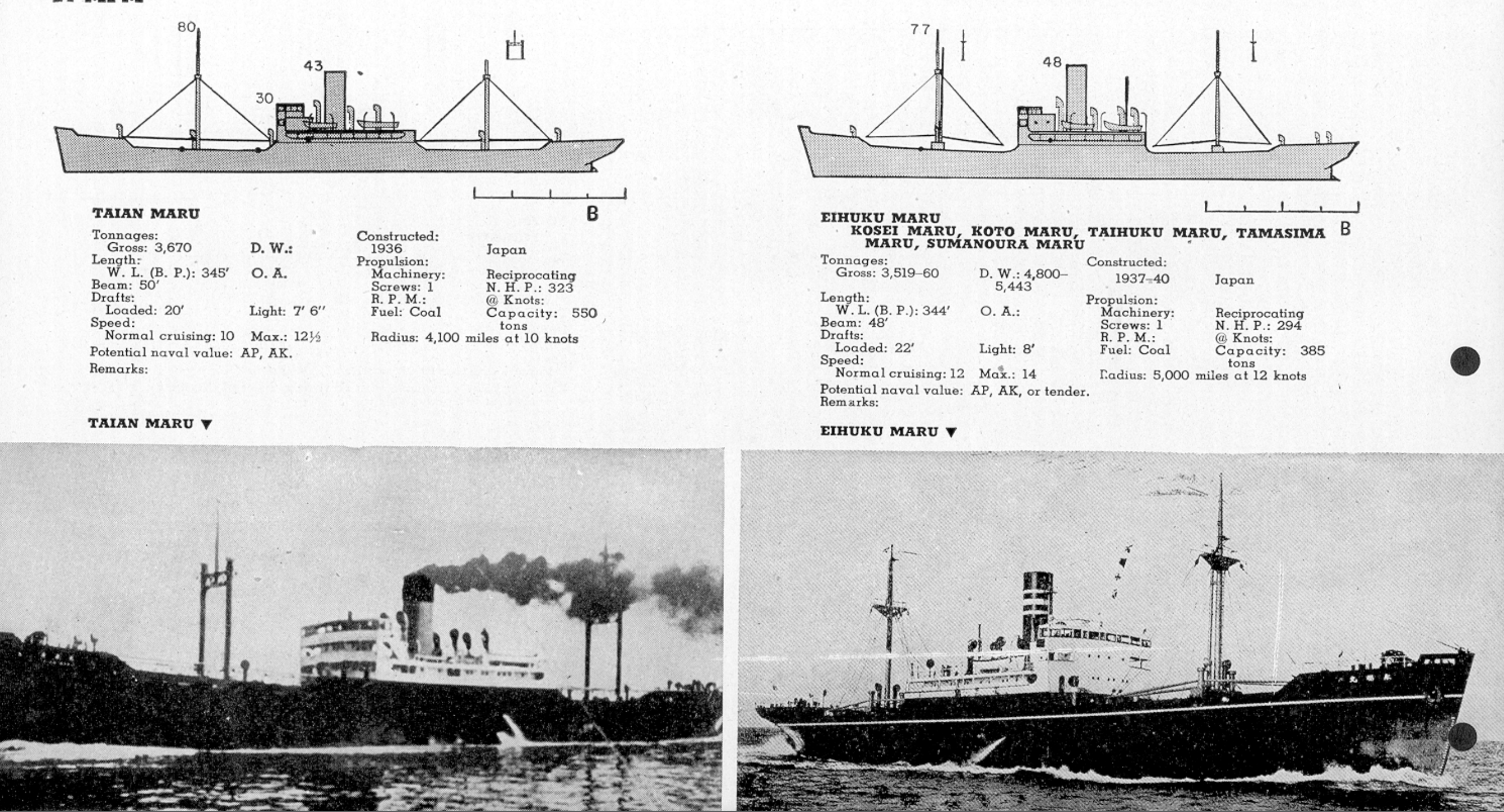
Sumanoura Maru, part of Eihuku Maru-class ships on the right.

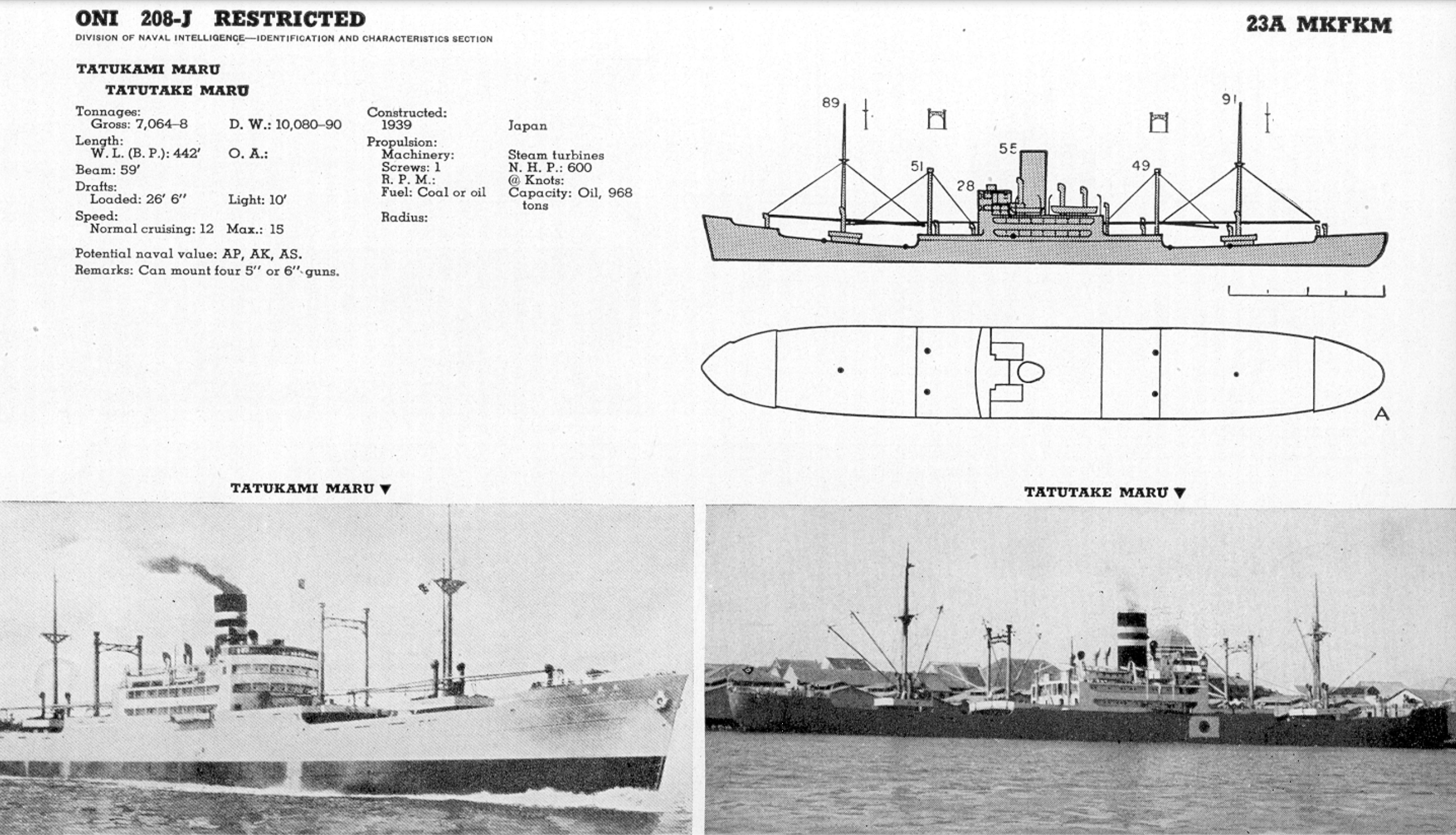
Tatsugami (Tatukami) Maru, on the left.

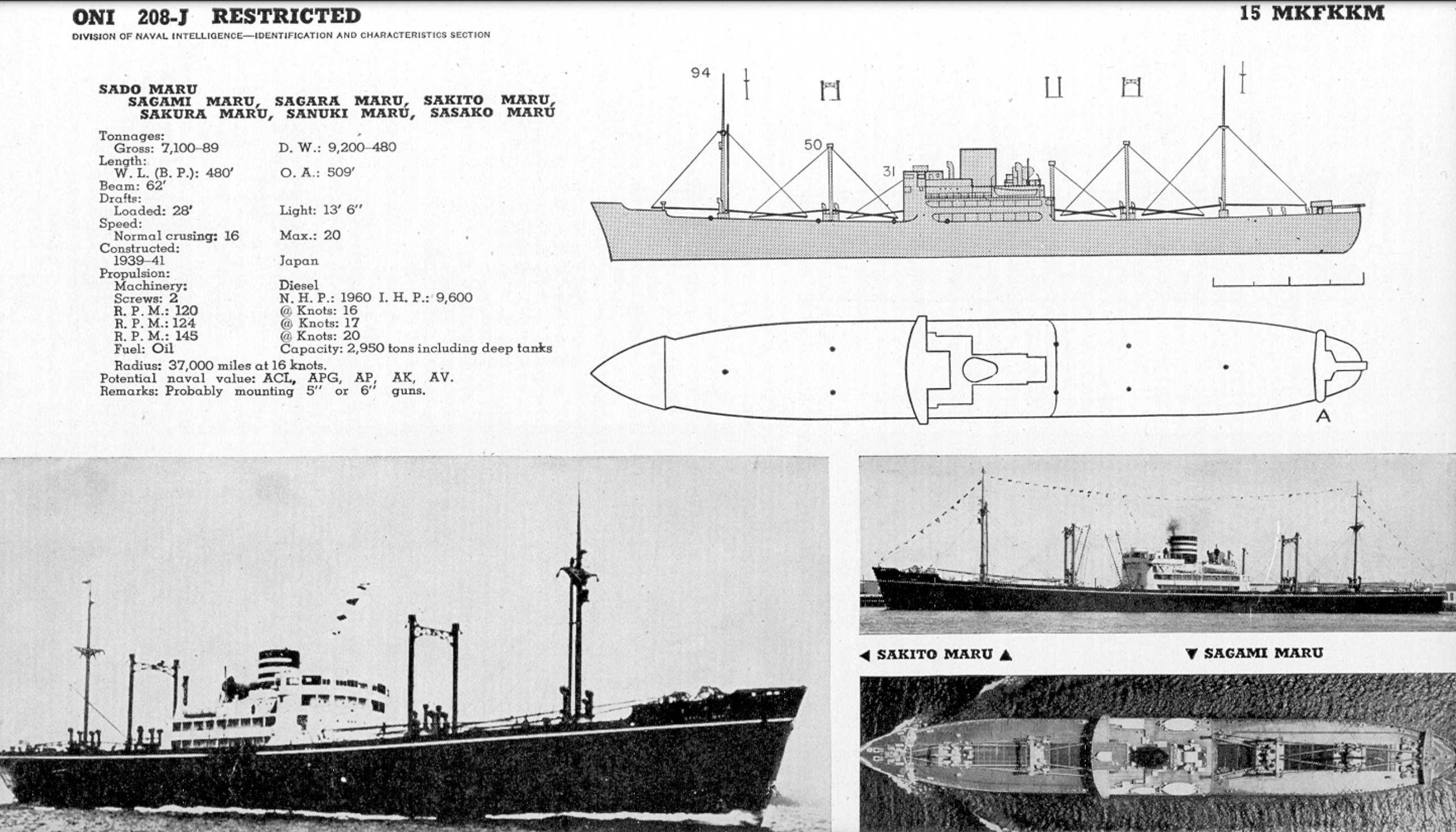
Sanuki Maru, part of the Sado Maru-class ship.

Out of 1,100 Dutch defenders, only 200 managed to reach Samarinda II on 6 February, where a majority of them were evacuated to Java.

=== Analyses ===
During the naval battle, TF 5 expended 48 torpedoes, but only managed to sink four of the 12 transports with seven confirmed hits (15% success rate). This poor performance was mainly caused by the unreliability of the Mark 15 torpedoes that had a tendency to either run deeper than set or not explode when they hit their target. Also, Commander Talbot was criticized for attacking the transports at high speed, which might have impaired the torpedoes' accuracy. Finally, the torpedoes were being operated by inexperienced crews.

Even though the battle did not have any effect on preventing the capture of Balikpapan, it was still the first surface engagement in Southeast Asia that the U.S. Navy had participated in since the Battle of Manila Bay in 1898. Its success helped boost the morale among the Americans and let the Dutch know that their ally was not shying away from a fight. Balikpapan remained under Japanese control until July 1945, when an Australian-led force liberated the city.
