= USS Paul Jones (DD-230) =

Clemson-class destroyer

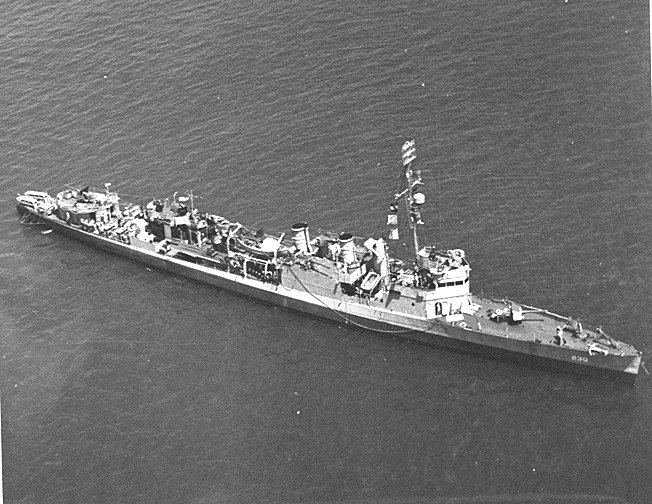
- USS Paul Jones (DD-230)

History

United States
- Namesake: John Paul Jones
- Builder: William Cramp & Sons, Philadelphia, Pennsylvania, U.S.
- Yard number: 496
- Laid down: 23 December 1919
- Launched: 30 September 1920
- Commissioned: 19 April 1921
- Reclassified: Miscellaneous auxiliary, AG-120, 30 June 1945
- Decommissioned: 5 November 1945
- Stricken: 28 November 1945
- Fate: Sold for scrap on 5 October 1947

General characteristics
- Class & type: Clemson-class destroyer
- Displacement: 1,215 tons
- Length: 314 feet 4 inches (95.81 m)
- Beam: 30 feet 8 inches (9.35 m)
- Draft: 9 feet 4 inches (2.84 m)
- Propulsion: 26,500 shp (20 MW); geared turbines, 2 screws
- Speed: 35 knots (65 km/h)
- Complement: 145 officers and enlisted
- Armament: 4 x 4 in (102 mm) guns, 1 x 3 in (76 mm) gun, 6 x 21 inch (533 mm) torpedo tubes.

USS Paul Jones (DD-230/AG–120) was a Clemson-class destroyer in the United States Navy during World War II. It was the third ship named for John Paul Jones.

== Construction and commissioning ==
Paul Jones was laid down 23 December 1919 and launched 30 September 1920 from William Cramp & Sons; sponsored by Miss Ethel Bagley; and commissioned 19 April 1921.

== Service history ==
After shakedown, Paul Jones joined the Atlantic Fleet for maneuvers, training, and coastal operations until transferred to the Pacific in 1923. She crossed the Pacific and joined the Asiatic Fleet in protecting American interest in the troubled Far East. Paul Jones participated in the Yangtze River Patrol and was assigned other patrol duties along the China coast, while making occasional voyages to and from Manila.

As flagship of Destroyer Squadron 29, Asiatic Fleet, she received the news of the attack on Pearl Harbor 8 December 1941, at Tarakan, Borneo, and immediately prepared for action. She got underway with Marblehead, Stewart, Barker, and Parrott for Makassar Strait and for the remainder of December acted as picket boat in the vicinity of Lombok Strait and Soerabaja Harbor, Java.

Her first war orders were to contact Dutch Naval Units for instructions pertaining to the search for a submarine in the Java Sea, which was reported to have sunk the Dutch vessel Langkoems, contact her survivors on Bawean Island and check the waters for additional survivors. Paul Jones was unable to make contact with the submarine, but rescued Dutch crewmen. On 9 January 1942, after a Japanese submarine had sunk a second Dutch merchantman, Paul Jones saved 101 men from drifting life-boats. With Van Ghent, she salvaged the abandoned U.S. Army cargo vessel Liberty, 12 January, and towed it safely to Tulamben, Bali. She joined a raiding group consisting of three other destroyers: John D. Ford, Pope, and Parrott, along with cruisers Marblehead and Boise, hoping to intercept a large enemy convoy heading southward toward Balikpapan. Boise retired early from the group because of a grounding mishap and Marblehead developed a faulty turbine forcing her to reduce speed and remain behind the destroyers to act as cover for withdrawal. The destroyers engaged the Japanese convoy and its screening warships the night of 23/24 January. Despite overwhelming odds, they came out of the fracas with only minor damage to John D. Ford. The enemy suffered losses from the torpedo attacks launched by the destroyers as they raced back and forth through the transport formation.

On 5 February Paul Jones rendezvoused with Tidore off Sumbawa Island to escort her to Timor. Shortly after they joined up, they were attacked by three separate groups of Japanese bombers. Paul Jones successfully dodged approximately 20 bombs, but Tidore was aground and a total loss. Fifteen crew members were picked up from a life boat, five were taken off the stricken vessel, and six more were gathered from the beaches. Paul Jones then steamed on to Java.

The American-British-Dutch-Australian Command (ABDA) commenced sweeps 24 February in search of enemy surface forces which might be attempting to make landings in the Java area, and to give what opposition they could to the Japanese advance. They encountered a Japanese covering force in the afternoon of 27 February and the Allies opened fire, beginning the Battle of the Java Sea. By 18:21, Paul Jones had expended her torpedoes. Dangerously low on fuel, she retreated to Soerabaja. The next morning Paul Jones and three other U.S. destroyers escaped encirclement by Japanese forces closing on all sides of Java, by hugging close to the shore line and laying smoke at high speed when sighted in the Bali Strait. Paul Jones and John D. Ford later escorted Black Hawk on to Fremantle, Australia, arriving 4 March.

Following repairs at Fremantle and Melbourne, Paul Jones sailed 12 May for San Francisco. She reached San Francisco 29 June and was assigned convoy escort duty between California and Pearl Harbor which continued until the end of March 1943.

Sailing in company with Parrott and Barker, Paul Jones departed San Francisco 30 March, transited the Panama Canal 6 May and reported to New York where she commenced convoy escort duty 28 May between North African ports and the U.S.

Convoy assignments were carried out until April 1944, when Paul Jones was assigned temporarily to antisubmarine (ASW) patrol seaward of Chesapeake Bay. She then made convoy runs to several United Kingdom ports before being assigned as training ship for newly commissioned submarines at Balboa, Panama Canal Zone, which commenced 9 November and terminated 6 April 1945, when she sailed for New York. She was next assigned to a task group consisting of oilers and destroyers serving as an at-sea terminus tanker group, for the purpose of refueling escorts of east and west bound convoys between Horta, Azores and Casablanca, French Morocco.

Paul Jones moored at Norfolk, Virginia 11 June, and was assigned as a plane guard destroyer for Lake Champlain, in which capacity she served until 4 August, when she sailed independently from Guantanamo Bay to return to Norfolk in preparation for inactivation. She was reclassified as a miscellaneous auxiliary (AG–120) as of 30 June 1945.

In October, she was stripped and assigned to the Commandant 5th Naval District for administrative purposes. She decommissioned 5 November 1945, was struck from the Naval Vessel Register 28 November 1945, and sold 5 October 1947 to the Northern Metal Company, Norfolk, which scrapped her in April 1948.

== Awards ==
- Yangtze Service Medal
- China Service Medal
- Asiatic-Pacific Campaign Medal with two battle stars
- European-African-Middle Eastern Campaign Medal
- World War II Victory Medal

== Legacy ==
A display featuring the photographs of Paul Jones 1921 commissioning crew is on display at the Brick Alley Pub in Newport, Rhode Island.
