= Wilton-Fijenoord Pantserwagen =

Dutch armoured car

The Wilton-Fijenoord Pantserwagen was a armoured car that was built by Wilton-Fijenoord in the Netherlands for the Royal Netherlands East Indies Army.

== Development ==
In 1933 the Dutch Ministry of Colonies placed an order at Wilton-Fijenoord for the construction of three Pantserwagens for the Royal Netherlands East Indies Army. The initial plan was to send the three Pantserwagens to the Dutch East Indies in 1934 to undergo trials and send another three in 1935. In May 1934 the first Pantserwagen arrived in Tandjong Priok in the Dutch East Indies and was ready to undergo trials. During the trials several problems and defects surfaced that did not surface earlier during tests in the Netherlands. As a result, it was decided to stop the shipping of the third pantserwagen to the Dutch East Indies. A special commission, named Commissie-Vennik, composed of vehicle experts was also created to take a look at the Wilton-Fijenoord Pantserwagen and report their conclusions. They concluded that the design was undersized as the engines were too weak when using regular indies gasoline and the chassis was too light for the heavy armor. After the conclusions of the Commissie-Vennik Wilton-Fijenoord took back the Pantserwagens and refunded all payments that had been made for the vehicles, except for the costs that were made for inspecting the vehicles and the transport to and from the Dutch East Indies. As a result, the two Pantserwagen were sent quickly back to the Netherlands as Wilton-Fijenoord had plans to sell them.

In February 1935 two Pantserwagens were sold to Brazil, while the third was used in several practice drives and trials.

== Design ==
The Wilton-Fijenoord Pantserwagen was built on a six-wheeled type L2H43 Krupp-chassis and could be steered and driven from either the back or front of the car. It was powered by a Krupp engine that was air-cooled, consisted of four cylinders and was capable of producing 50 horsepower. There was also an electric installation inside the car made by Bosch which provided electricity to the fresh air and lighting systems. Furthermore, the electric installation allowed the crew to apply 550 voltage to the exterior of the vehicle. For difficult terrain tracks could be attached to the wheels to make it easier to navigate.

When it came to armaments the car was equipped with three machine guns; one was placed at the front, one at the back and one in the turret. Besides a machine gun, there was also a periscope in the turret.

The car was protected by 8 millimeter thick steel armor that was made by Wilton-Fijenoord and provided protection against bullets from light machine guns and shrapnel from a distance of 30 meters. The armor was also made in a way that there were no vertical surfaces, which made penetration by a projectile in an angle of 90 degrees nearly impossible. There was room for a crew of five people.

The Wilton-Fijenoord Pantserwagen had a price of 25.500 Dutch guilders each.

=== Problems ===
During the trials in the Dutch East Indies several problems came to light. The vehicle was too heavy for the roads and the engine did not work with the regular gasoline that was available in the Dutch East Indies. To remedy the gasoline problem aviation gasoline was used, but this meant that the Pantserwagen could only be used near areas that had that particular gasoline. Furthermore, if the Pantserwagen drove over uneven terrain the heavy armor threatened to break the chassis. The chassis was originally used for normal trucks and could therefore not withstand the weight of the heavy steel armor. Some experts argued that if the design was made using cheaper materials the armoured car might have sufficed.

== Service history ==
In March 1936 the remaining Pantserwagen in the Netherlands took part in a 24 hours practice drive that was organized by the Vrijewillige Burgerwacht te Amsterdam.

== See also ==
- Overvalwagen
