= HNLMS Soemenep =

World War II Dutch minelayer

History

Netherlands
- Name: Soemenep
- Builder: Droogdok Mij, Surabaya
- Laid down: 1930
- Launched: 1931
- Acquired: 1940
- Commissioned: 17 June 1941
- Decommissioned: 2 March 1942
- Renamed: HNLMS RS 101 (1945–1946); HNLMS A 871 (1946–1950)
- Fate: Scuttled 2 March 1942, raised by Japanese forces, sold in 1950 to Indonesian Navy

General characteristics
- Type: Minelayer
- Displacement: 227 t (223 long tons) standard
- Length: 35.86 m (117 ft 8 in)
- Beam: 8.11 m (26 ft 7 in)
- Draught: 2.82 m (9 ft 3 in)
- Installed power: 400 hp (300 kW)
- Propulsion: 1 x triple expansion engine
- Speed: 10 knots (19 km/h; 12 mph)
- Complement: 26
- Armament: 2 x 12.7 mm (0.50 in) machine guns; 26 Mines

HNLMS Soemenep was a Royal Netherlands Navy minelayer. Originally constructed as a tugboat, the ship was commandeered in 1940 and rebuilt as a minelayer. Once the reconstruction was completed on 17 June 1941 the ship was commissioned.

== Service history ==
Soemenep laid multiple minefields off the coast of eastern Borneo in the first days of the war in the Pacific. When Japanese forces captured Balikpapan, Soemenep quickly made its way to Surabaya harbor. It was in this harbor that on 2 March 1942 the crew realized they would be unable to escape to Australia following the ABDA loss at the Battle of the Java Sea, causing the crew to scuttle the ship.

Soemenep was discovered and raised by Japanese forces which employed the vessel as a tug for the duration of the war. Once the war ended, the ship was returned to the Royal Netherlands Navy and resumed service. The ship continued to serve as a tug until its transfer to the new Indonesian Navy in 1950.
