= P. H. Talbot =

United States Navy Officer

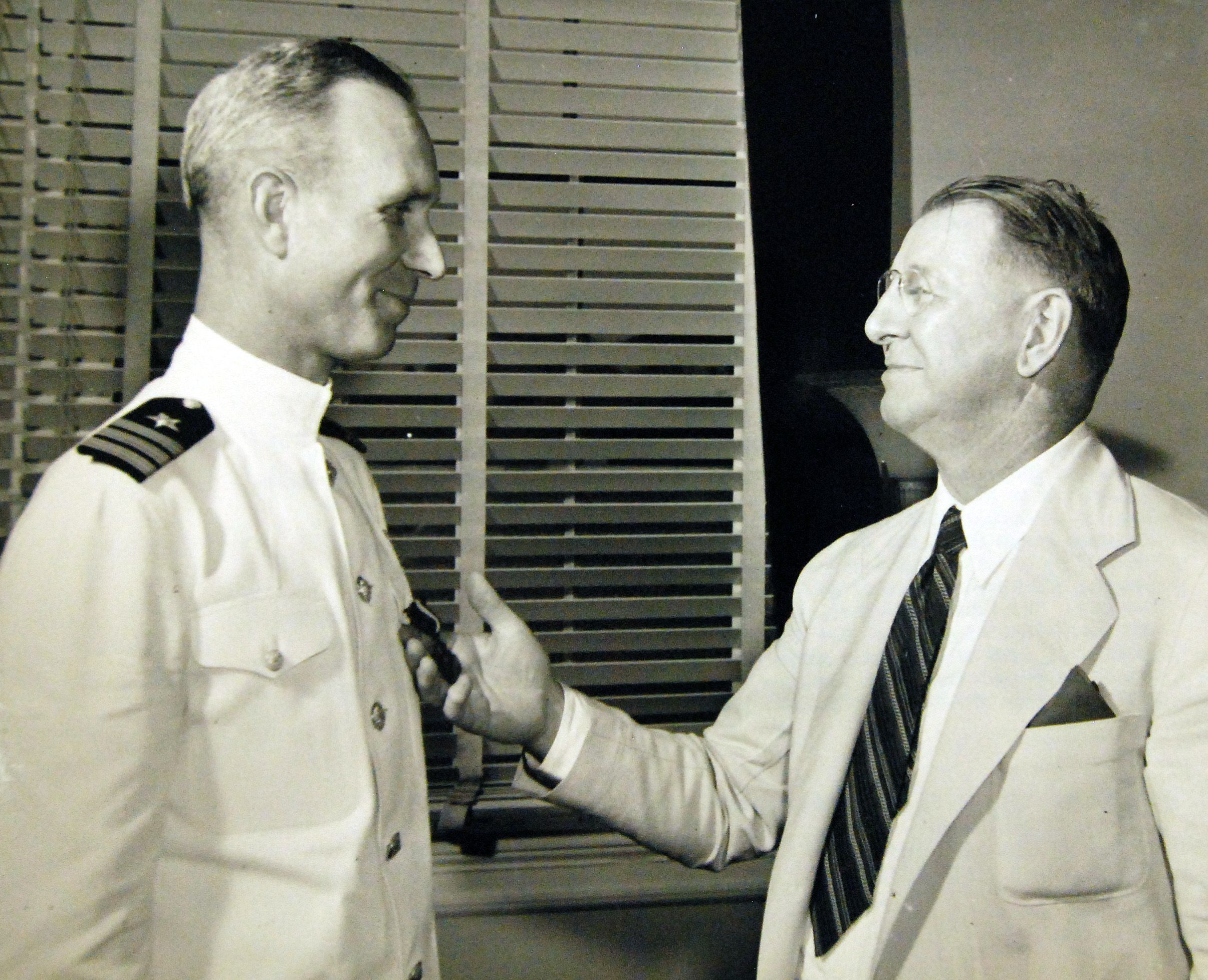
Commander Talbot (left) received the Navy Cross from Secretary of the Navy Frank Knox in July 1942

Rear Admiral Paul Hopkins (P. H.) Talbot (3 April 1897 – 9 September 1974) was an officer in the United States Navy who served in World War I and World War II. A 1918 graduate of the United States Naval Academy, he served on destroyers during World War I. He was awarded the Navy Cross for distinguished service and heroism as commander of Destroyer Squadron 59 while engaging the Japanese off Balikpapan, Borneo, Netherlands East Indies, on 24 and 25 January 1942.

As a Lieutenant Commander, Talbot was the first captain of the USS Helm, taking command on 16 October 1937. He was succeeded by Lt. Cmdr. Percival E. McDowell on 5 June 1939. Talbot was promoted to Commander on 1 June 1939 and then to Captain on 17 June 1942. After Balikpapan, Captain Talbot was assigned to the staff of the Army-Navy Staff College (ANSCOL) based at the U. S. Navy War College in Newport, Rhode Island

== Later life ==
Captain Paul Talbot retired from the United States Navy in March 1948. Based on his combat record, he was advanced to Rear Admiral on the Navy retired list.

== See also ==
- Battle of Balikpapan (1942)
