= William V. O'Regan =

American Navy admiral

William Vincent O'Regan
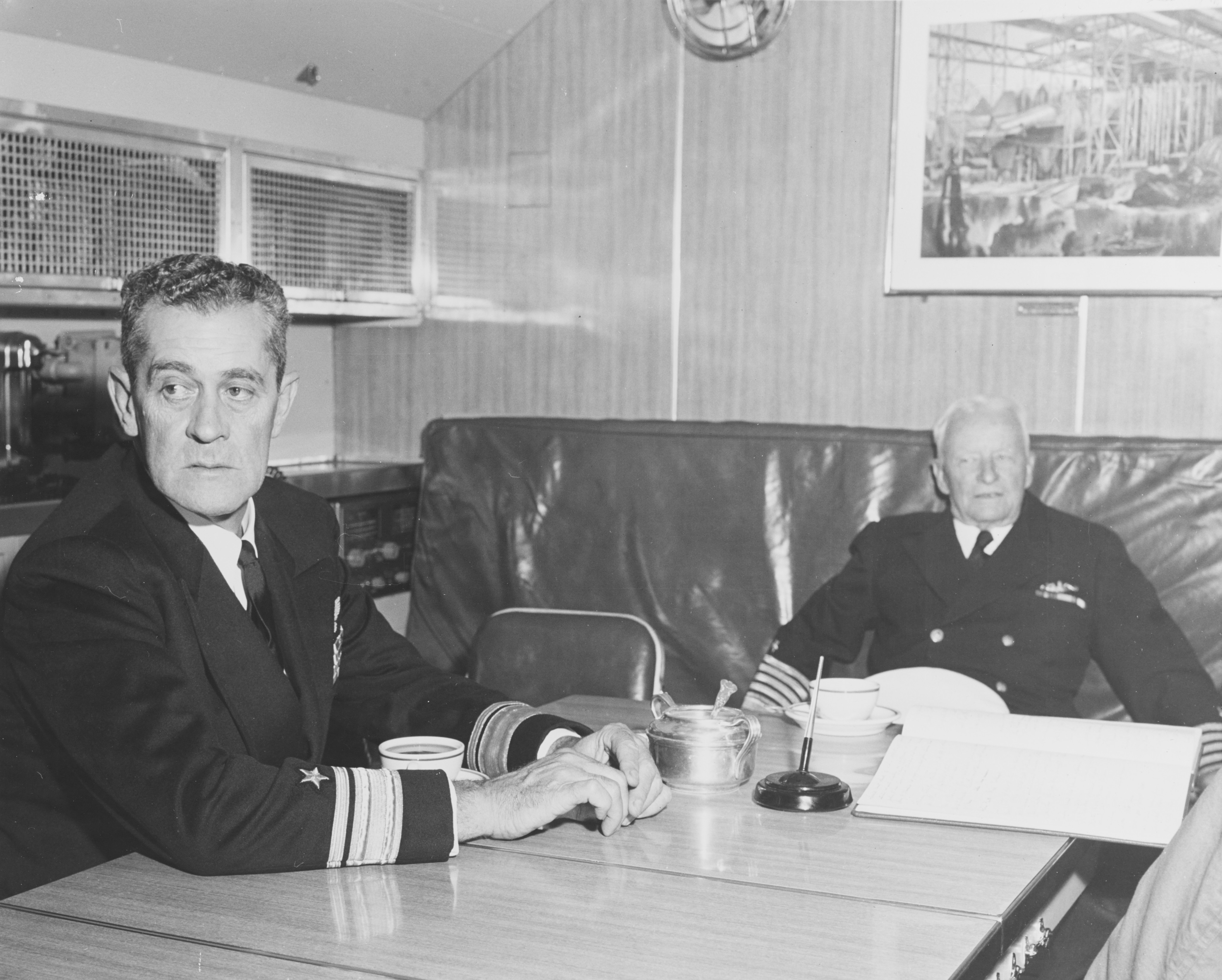
- Rear Adm. O'Regan with Fleet Adm. Nimitz in 1957
- Born: April 25, 1900; New York, New York
- Died: January 13, 1978 (aged 77); Palo Alto, California
- Alma mater: United States Naval Academy
- Military career
- Allegiance: United States of America
- Branch: United States Navy
- Service years: 1923–1958
- Rank: Vice Admiral
- Nickname: "Mickey"
- Commands: Naval Det New York World's Fair; Submarine Repair Unit Two; Submarine Repair Unit Pearl Harbor; Submarine Base Midway Island; Submarine Division Forty Two; Submarine Squadron Four; USS Dayton (CL-105); ComMinLant; Cruiser Division Five; Mare Island Naval Shipyard
- Conflicts: World War II; Korean War
- Awards: Navy Cross; Legion of Merit (2)

William Vincent O'Regan (25 April 1900 – 13 January 1978) was a decorated submarine commander during World War II who reached the rank of Vice Admiral in the United States Navy.

Raised on Staten Island, O'Regan was appointed to the United States Naval Academy in 1919. He graduated in 1923 and was commissioned as an ensign.

O'Regan was trained as a submarine engineering officer, serving aboard submarines or at submarine bases, but never given an individual submarine to command. Instead, he eventually commanded groups of submarines and other vessels. During World War II, he was given command of Submarine Squadron Four consisting of Thresher, Guardfish, Apogon and Piranha. "Mickey" O'Regan successfully led his "Mickey Finns" on a patrol near Formosa in the East China Sea in June–July 1944. The destruction of enemy shipping by his submarines earned him a Navy Cross. He was also awarded the Legion of Merit for his full wartime service.

After the war, he briefly commanded the cruiser Dayton in 1948. Promoted to Rear Admiral, O'Regan assumed command of Cruiser Division Five in September 1952. During the Korean War, he earned his second Legion of Merit for leading the division off the North Korean coast from November 1952 to April 1953.

From 1953 to 1957, O'Regan served as assistant chief of naval operations for logistics in Washington, D.C. His final assignment was to command the Mare Island Naval Shipyard in California. He retired from active duty in 1958 and was advanced to Vice Admiral on the retired list based on his wartime service record.

After his military retirement, O'Regan moved to Los Altos, California and taught mathematics at Mountain View High School for twelve years. He died at the Veterans Administration hospital in Palo Alto.

O'Regan and his wife Louise Farren O'Regan were buried at Arlington National Cemetery. They had two sons and five grandchildren.
