= William Lovett Anderson =

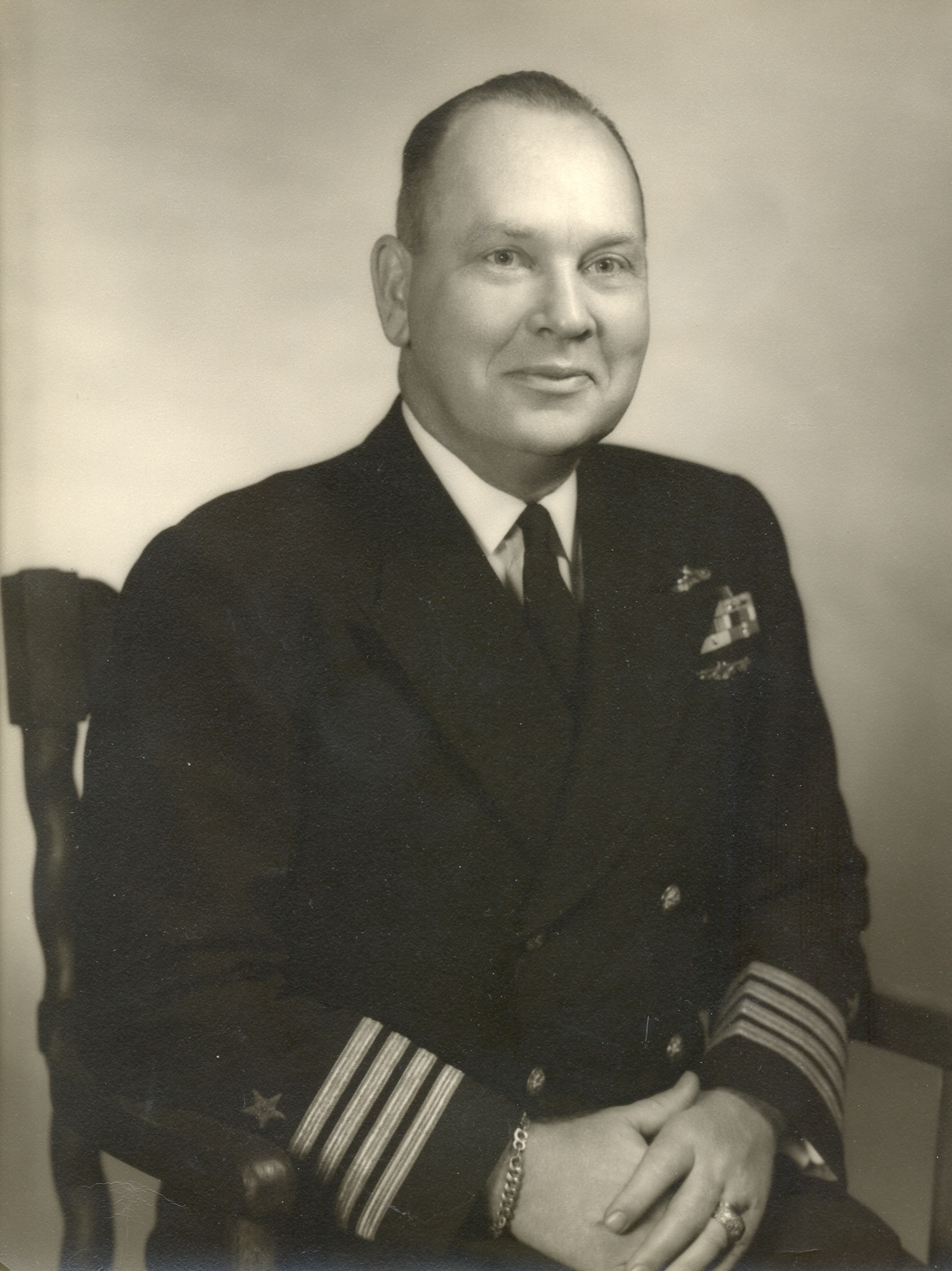
- Born: April 10, 1906; Sylvania, Georgia
- Died: November 27, 2004 (aged 98); White Rock, South Carolina
- Spouse: Marian Jeanette Gibson
- Relatives: Albert Sydney Anderson Jr. (Brother), Charles Edison Anderson (Brother)
- Military career
- Allegiance: United States of America
- Branch: United States Navy
- Service years: 1926-1956
- Rank: Rear Admiral
- Nicknames: "Bill", "Skipper"
- Commands: USS S-22 (SS-127); USS Thresher (SS-200); Destroyer Squadron 13
- Conflicts: World War II; Korean War
- Awards: Navy Cross; Bronze Star (2); Commendation Medal

William Lovett Anderson (10 April 1906 – 27 November 2004), was a decorated submarine commander during World War II who reached the rank of Rear Admiral in the United States Navy.

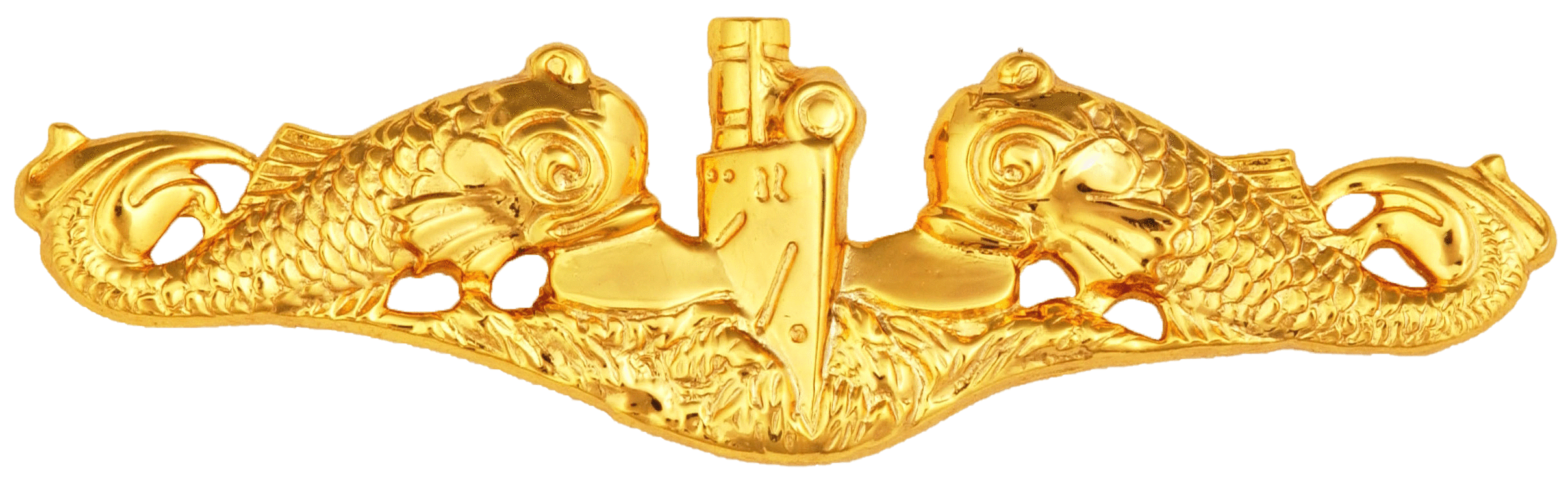

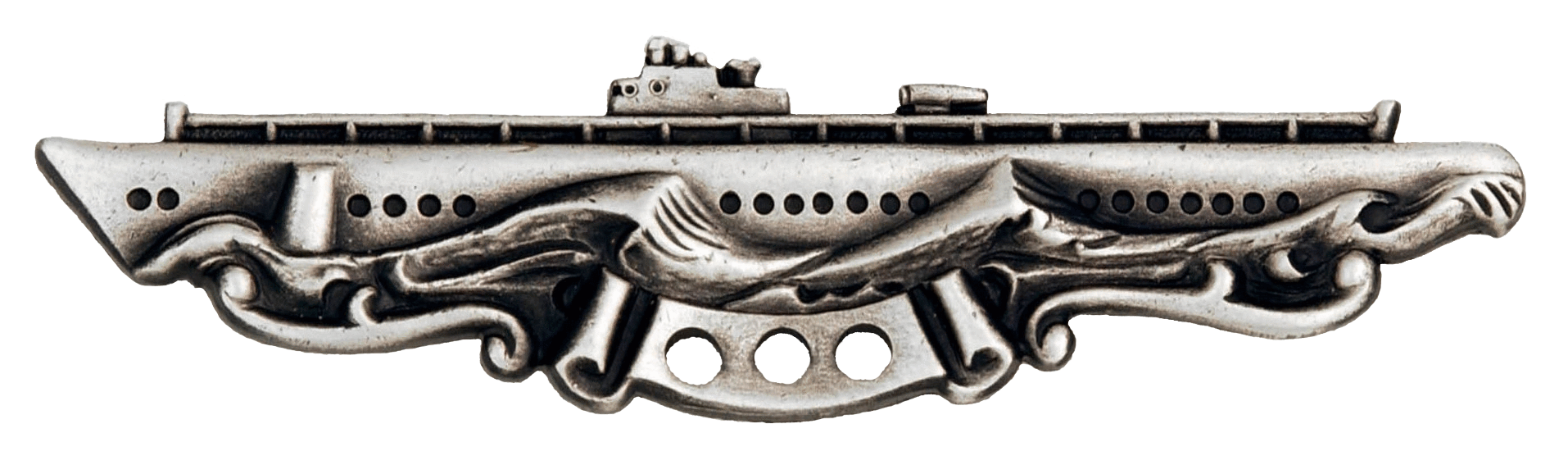
