= SS Gyōkū Maru =

Japanese merchant ship in World War II

History
- Name: Empire Dragon (1941); Gyōkū Maru (1942–44)
- Owner: Ministry of War Transport (1941); Japanese Government (1942–44)
- Port of registry: Japan
- Builder: Hong Kong & Whampoa Dock Company
- Laid down: 6 December 1941
- Launched: August 1943
- Completed: 1943
- Out of service: 18 September 1944
- Fate: Torpedoed and sunk, 18 September 1944

General characteristics
- Type: Cargo ship
- Tonnage: 6,854 GRT
- Length: 430 ft (130 m)
- Beam: 57 ft (17 m)
- Propulsion: Triple expansion steam engine

Location where Gyōkū Maru was torpedoed and sunk off China.

Gyōkū Maru (暁空丸) was a 6,854 GRT cargo ship that was laid down 6 December 1941 as Empire Dragon by Hong Kong & Whampoa Dock Co Ltd, Hong Kong for the Ministry of War Transport (MoWT). She was seized by the Japanese on 26 December 1941 with the fall of Hong Kong and completed as Gyōkū Maru in August, 1943, serving until September 1944 when she was torpedoed and sunk by USS Thresher in the Yellow Sea.

== Description ==
The ship was laid down in 1941 by Hong Kong & Whampoa Dock Co Ltd, Hong Kong.

The ship was 430 feet (130 m) long, with a beam of 57 feet (17 m). She was assessed at 6,854 GRT.

The ship was propelled by a triple expansion steam engine.

== History ==
Empire Dragon was laid down on 6 December 1941. On 26 December 1941, she was seized by the Japanese in an incomplete state and completed as Gyōkū Maru in August, 1943. and placed in IJA service.

On 22 August 1944, she was part of Convoy Namo 103 carrying evacuating civilians from Okinawa and attacked by USS Bowfin. The fellow ship Tsushima Maru was sunk, but Gyōkū Maru escaped.

On 18 September 1944, Gyōkū Maru was torpedoed and sunk by USS Thresher in the Yellow Sea (35°02′N 124°24′E). 1,546 civilian refugees were drowned.
