= Akusekijima =

Island within the Ryukyu Islands

Native name: 悪石島
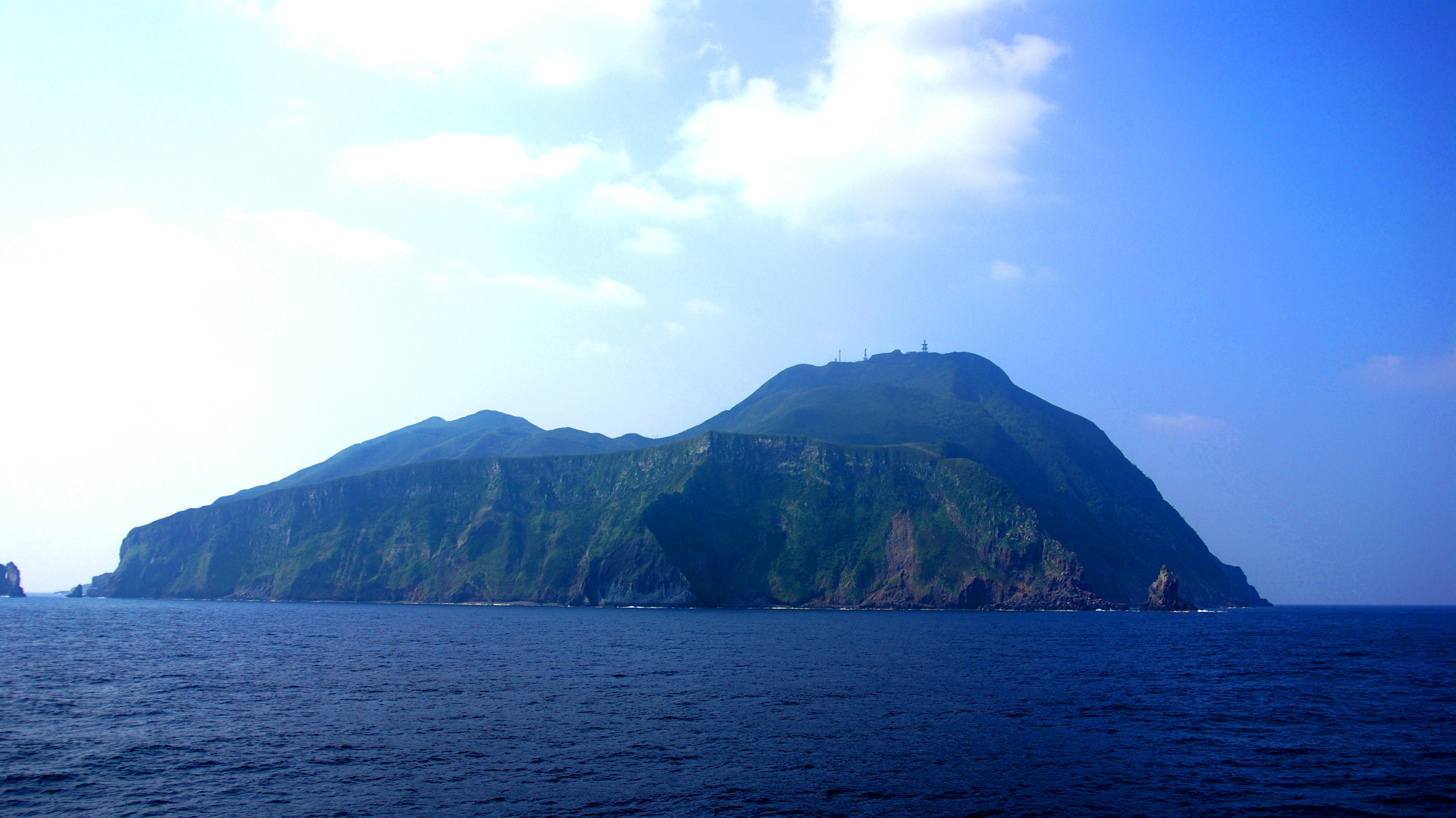
- View from the ferry Toshima, May 2007
- Interactive map of Akusekijima

Geography
- Location: East China Sea
- Coordinates: 29°27′06″N 129°36′04″E
- Archipelago: Tokara Islands
- Area: 7.49 km^{2} (2.89 sq mi)
- Length: 3.2 km (1.99 mi)
- Width: 2.5 km (1.55 mi)
- Coastline: 12.64 km (7.854 mi)
- Highest elevation: 584 m (1916 ft)
- Highest point: Midake

Administration
- Japan

Demographics
- Population: 59 (2004)
- Pop. density: 7.87/km^{2} (20.38/sq mi)
- Ethnic groups: Japanese

Akusekijima (Japanese: 悪石島) is one of the Tokara Islands, a subgroup of the Satsunan Islands belonging to Kagoshima Prefecture, Japan. The island, 7.42 km² in area, has a population of 59 persons. The island can only be reached by boat, as it has no airport; there is a ferry service twice per week to the city of Kagoshima on the mainland. Travel time is about 11 hours. The islanders are dependent mainly on fishing and seasonal tourism.

== Geography ==
Akusekijima is located 38 kilometres (21 nmi) southwest of Nakanoshima. The island has an area of approximately 7.49 square kilometres (2.89 sq mi) with a length of about 3.2 kilometres (2.0 mi) and a width of 2.5 kilometres (1.6 mi). Most of the island is surrounded by steep cliffs.

The island is an andesite – dacite stratovolcano formed by two summit craters, Biroyama (ビロ山) 355.5 metres (1,166 ft) and Nakadake (中岳). 464 metres (1,522 ft). Mitake (御岳山) 584 metres (1,916 ft), the highest elevation on the island, is a lava dome. Lava flows in the northern portion of the island have been dated to 80,000 years ago. There has been no volcanic activity in historic times.

Its climate is classified as subtropical, with a rainy season from May through September.

== History ==
Until 1624, the island was part of the Ryukyu Kingdom. During the Edo period, Takarajima was part of Satsuma Domain and was administered as part of Kawabe District. In 1896, the island was transferred to the administrative control of Ōshima District, Kagoshima, and from 1911 was part of the village of Toshima, Kagoshima. From 1946-1952, the island was administered by the United States as part of the Provisional Government of Northern Ryukyu Islands.

During World War II, on 22 August 1944, Tsushima Maru, a Japanese passenger/cargo ship, was sunk just outside Akusekijima’s northwest coast by torpedoes launched by the submarine USS Bowfin (SS-287) off this island, killing 1,484 civilians including 767 schoolchildren. Annual commemorations are held on the island and there is also a memorial museum.

Akusekijima drew attention during the Solar eclipse of July 22, 2009, which was the longest total solar eclipse of the twenty-first century, as the island was one of the closest inhabited areas to the location of maximum eclipse duration. Touted as one of the best observation spots for the event, village officials and island residents were concerned about playing host to hundreds of people coming to view the solar eclipse. Akusekijima only has five small minshuku guesthouses, which can only accommodate up to 66 people, and water resources are limited as rainfall is the primary source of water.

== Culture ==
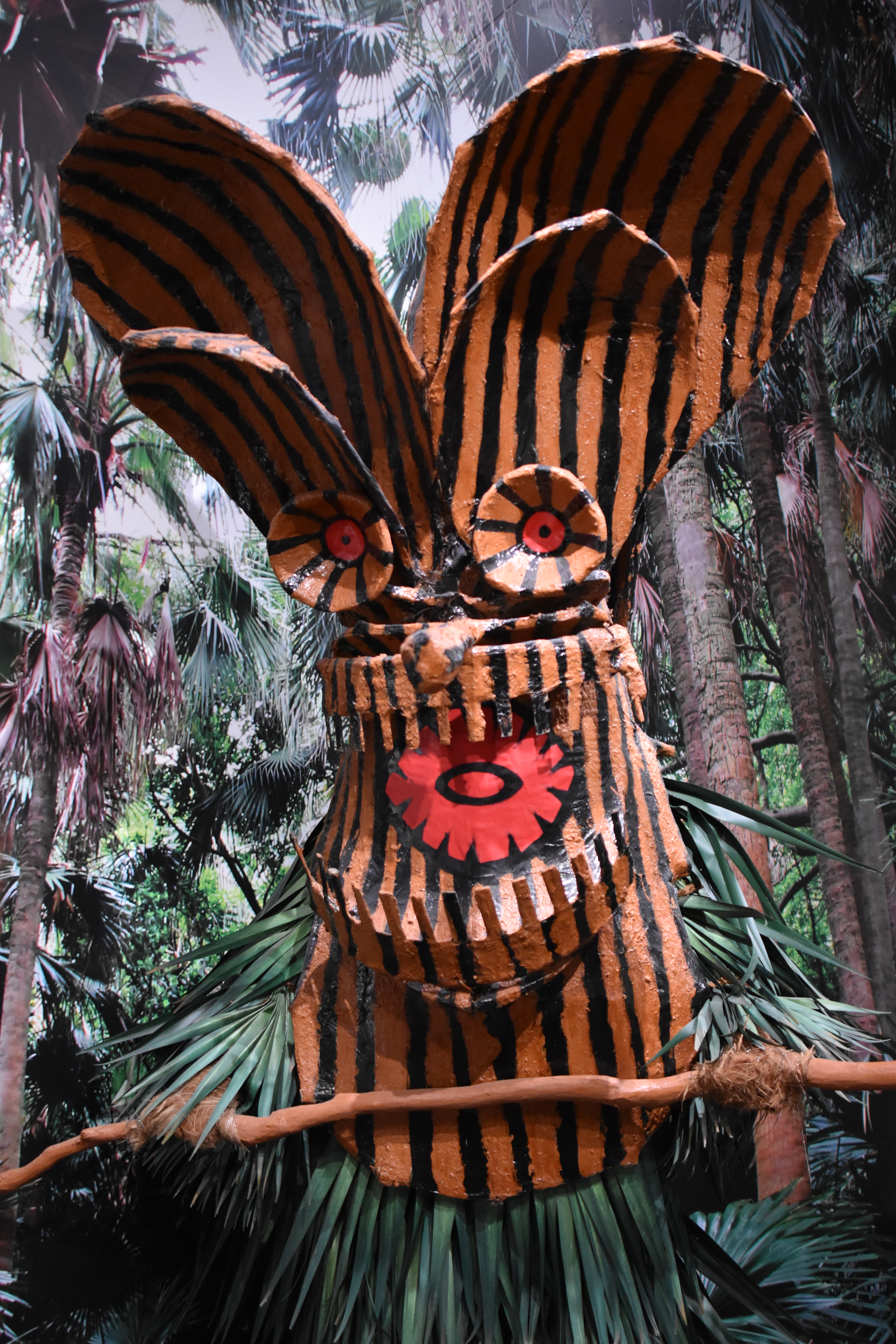
The Masked God Boze of Akusekijima Island exhibit at the Kagoshima Prefectural Museum

Akusekijima is also famous for the masked god Boze (ボゼ), the island deity. Islanders donning Boze masks come out during the annual lunar O-Bon matsuri. Protectors of the island and its natural assets, the Boze frighten small children to ensure their safety for the coming year.

== See also ==
- List of islands in Japan
- List of volcanoes in Japan
