= Tsushima Maru =

Japanese passenger/cargo ship in service 1914–1944

Coordinates: 29°32′33″N 129°33′30″E

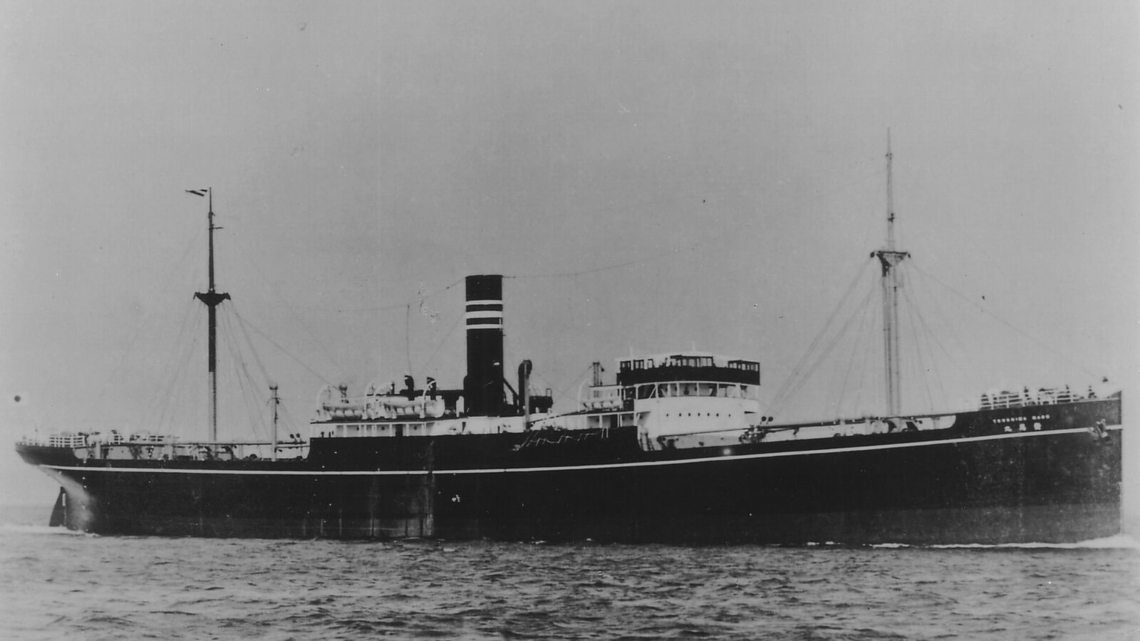

History

Japan
- Owner: Nippon Yusen Kaisha
- Builder: Russell & Company, Scotland
- Launched: 8 September 1914
- In service: December 1914
- Fate: Sunk 22 August 1944

General characteristics
- Class & type: Cargo ship (Nippon Yusen)
- Tonnage: 6,712 GRT
- Length: 445 ft (135.6 m) BP
- Beam: 58 ft (17.7 m) moulded
- Depth: 58 ft (17.7 m) moulded

Tsushima Maru (Japanese: 対馬丸) was a Japanese passenger/cargo ship that was sunk by the submarine USS Bowfin during World War II, while carrying hundreds of schoolchildren from Okinawa to Nagasaki.

== Events ==
Tsushima Maru was carrying a large number of Japanese civilians evacuating from Okinawa to Kagoshima in compliance with government orders to prepare for an invasion of the Ryukyu Islands. The passengers were primarily school-aged children, as well as a few parents and school teachers. The ship was estimated to have carried 1,788 passengers, of whom only 254 survived. 1,534 passengers and crew died including 780 of the schoolchildren. Just 59 young boys and girls survived.

== Sinking ==
On 22 August 1944, at between 10:00 p.m. and 10:30 p.m. local time, USS Bowfin attacked the convoy in which Tsushima Maru was sailing and sank her, close to the island of Akusekijima. Tsushima Maru Commemoration Association Survey Data (as of 27 August 2005) reported a total of 1,661 civilian evacuees, including 834 schoolchildren (of whom 775 were killed and approximately 59 survived the sinking). Shortly after the sinking a "gag order" was enforced by the Japanese government and families and survivors rarely spoke about the incident. The number of victims that have been identified by name, based on notifications from bereaved families (as of 22 August 2012), include 780 schoolchildren.

The ship was part of Convoy Namo 103, which consisted of the following ships:

- Tsushima Maru (passenger / cargo vessel)
- Kazuura Maru (listed as Waura Maru in some sources, assumed to be a cargo vessel)
- Gyōkū Maru (cargo vessel)
- Destroyer Hasu (Momi class)
- Gunboat Uji

== Aftermath ==
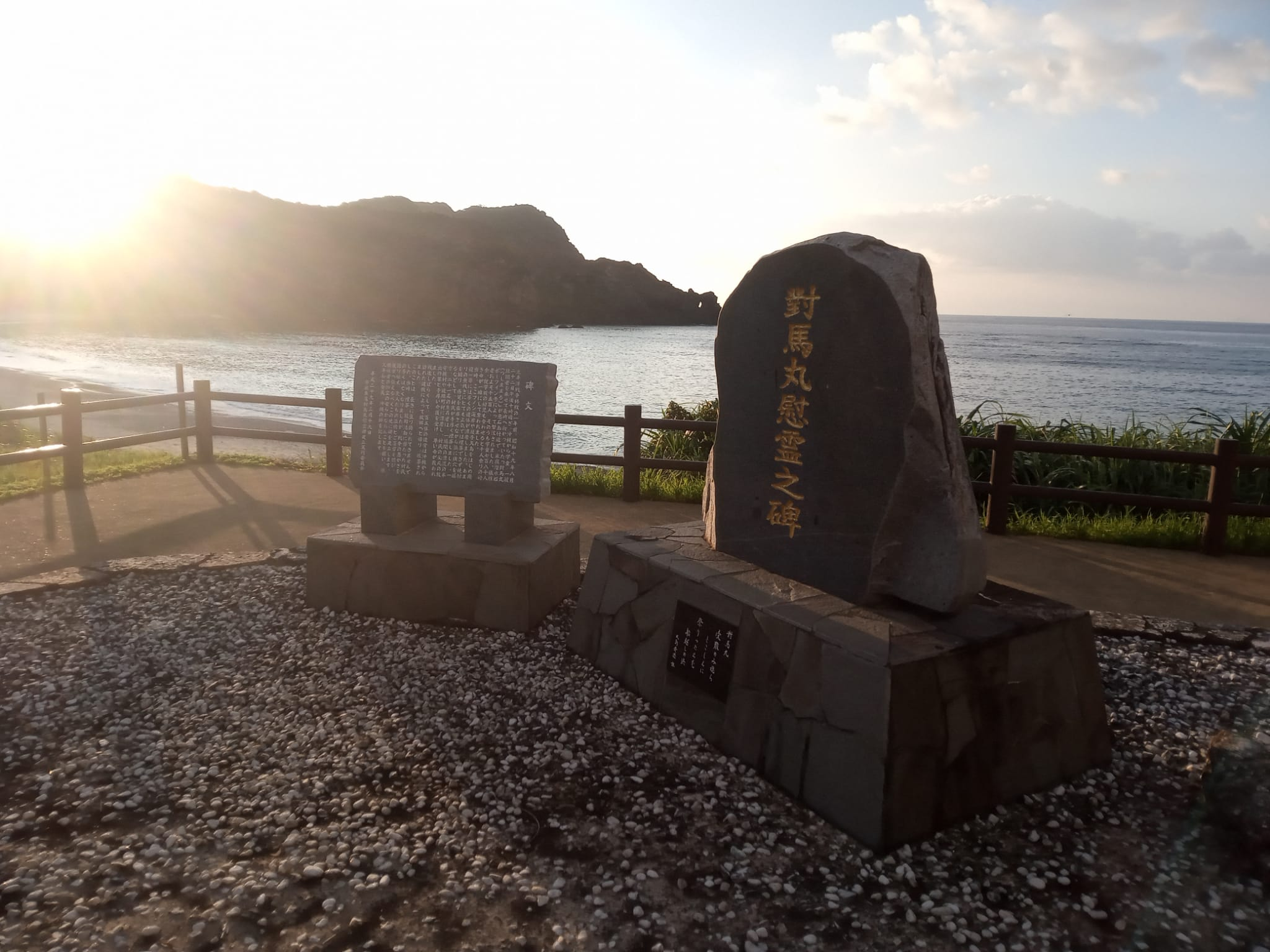
A memorial to the victims of the Tsushima Maru's sinking, at Funakoshi Beach in Amami Ōshima

The wreck was located and identified in December 1997. The sinking has been the subject of many articles, books, and documentaries published in Japan. Memorial ceremonies are held at sea at the approximate location of the sinking, and there are monuments in Naha City, Okinawa, Akuseki Island and Amami Island (Funakoshi beach) for those lost at sea.

As of January 2026, the Japanese government were considering retrieving artifacts from the wreckage.

== Museum ==
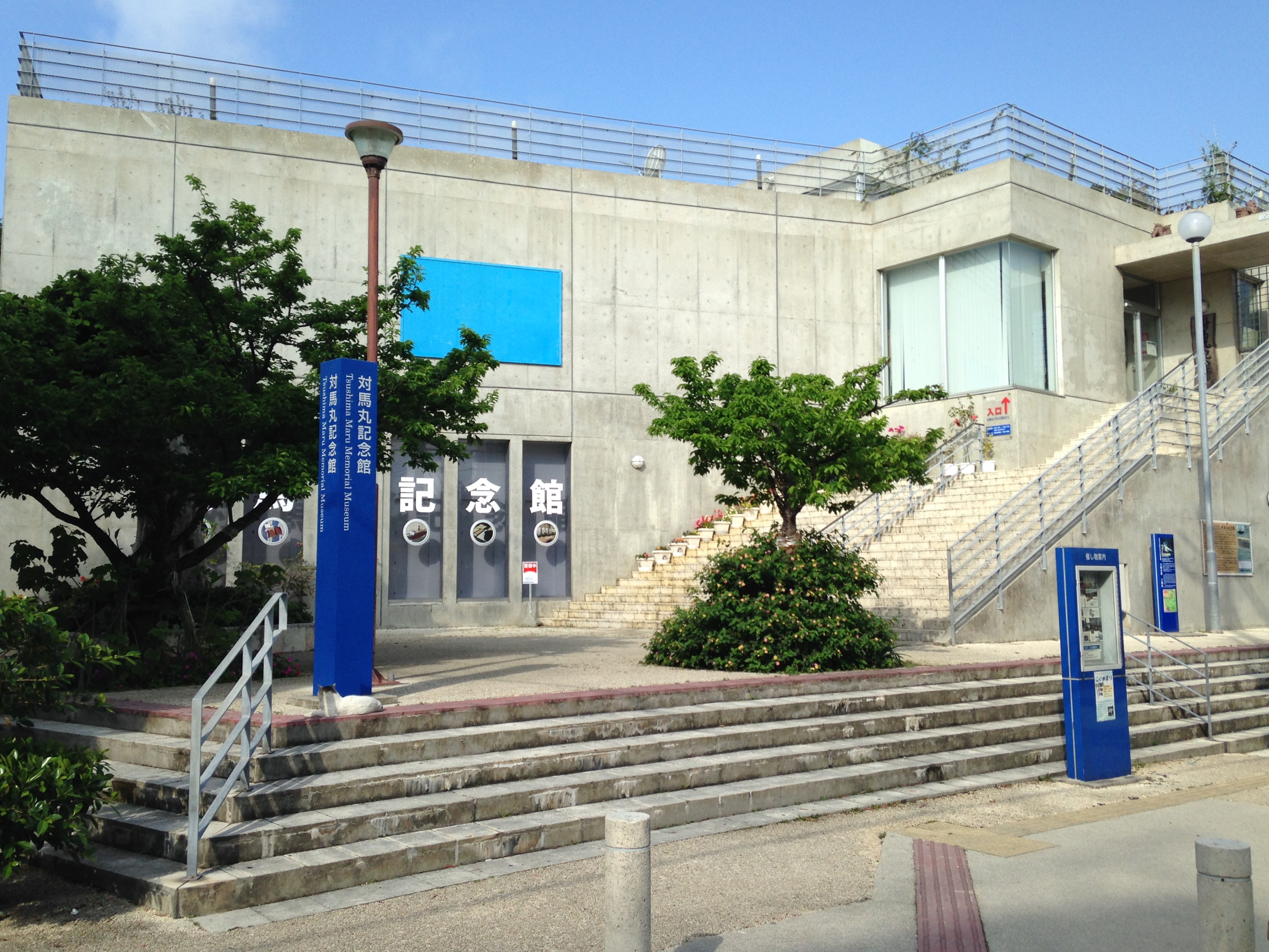
The museum in 2015

Photos of identified students are on display at the Tsushima Maru Memorial Museum in Naha, Okinawa.

== See also ==
- List by death toll of ships sunk by submarines
