= Teiryu Maru =

Steam cargo ship

Coordinates: 19°08′N 116°13′E

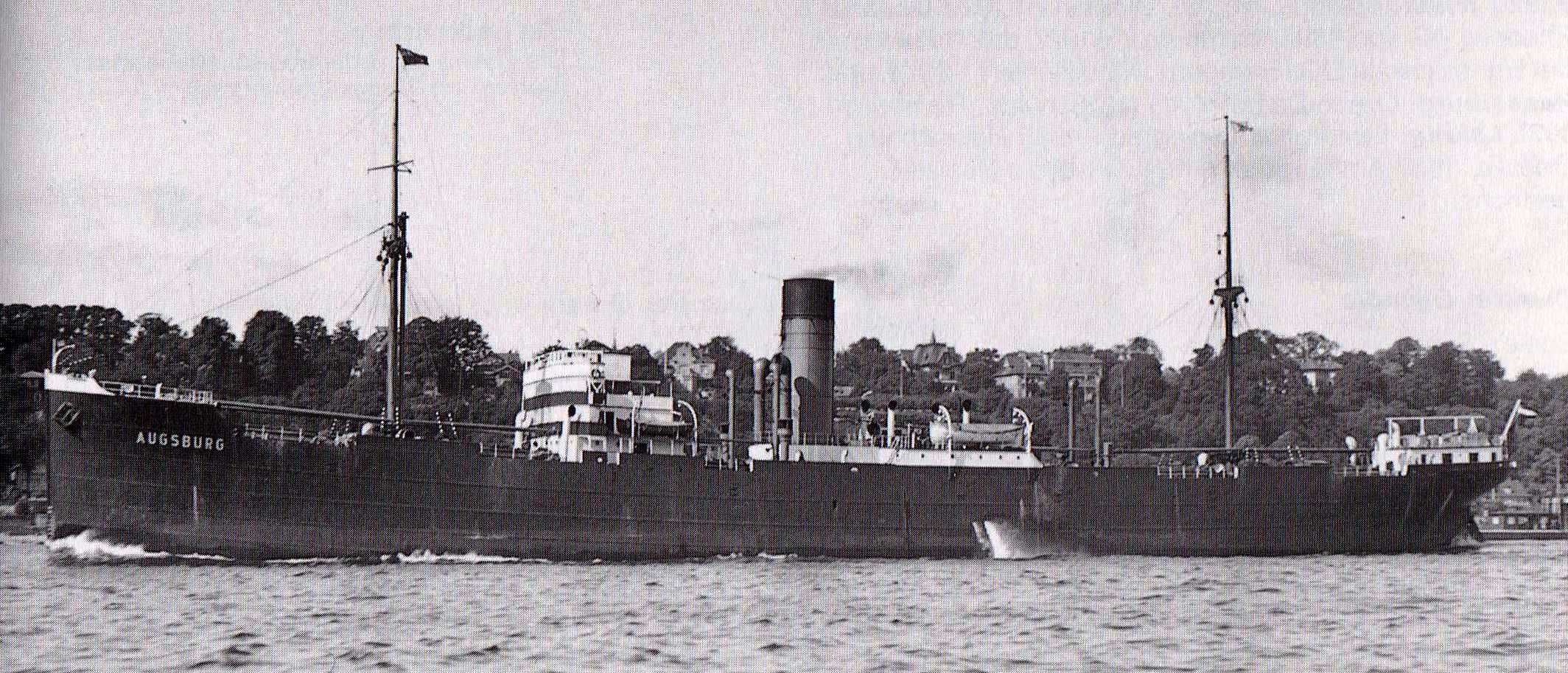
- Augsburg in 1928

History
- Name: 1914: Northwestern Miller; 1927: Augsburg; 1941: Teiryu Maru
- Namesake: 1927: Augsburg
- Owner: 1915: Norfolk & N American SS Co; 1927: Norddeutscher Lloyd; 1940: Japanese government; 1941: Teikoku Kisen KK
- Operator: 1915: Furness, Withy & Co; 1927: Norddeutscher Lloyd; 1940: Dairen Kisen KK; 1941: Teikoku Kisen KK
- Port of registry: 1915: (United Kingdom) Liverpool; 1927: (Weimar Republic) (Nazi Germany) Bremen; 1941: (Empire of Japan) Tokyo
- Route: 1920–21: London – New York
- Builder: Northumberland Shipbuilding Co
- Yard number: 221
- Launched: 19 October 1914
- Completed: March 1915
- Identification: 1915–27: UK official number 137431; 1915–27: code letters JKGP; 1927–33: code letters QMGN; 1934–41: call sign DOEM; 1941–44: call sign JQQO
- Fate: Torpedoed and sunk, 19 July 1944

General characteristics
- Type: Cargo ship
- Tonnage: 1915: 6,504 GRT, 4,095 NRT
- Length: 419.8 ft (128.0 m)
- Beam: 53.4 ft (16.3 m)
- Draught: 28 ft 2 in (8.59 m)
- Depth: 36.1 ft (11.0 m)
- Decks: 2
- Installed power: 682 NHP
- Propulsion: triple expansion engine
- Speed: 12.5 knots (23 km/h)
- Crew: 38
- Sensors & processing systems: by 1930: submarine signalling; wireless direction finding
- Notes: sister ship: Southwestern Miller

SS Teiryu Maru was a steam cargo ship that was launched in England in 1914 as Northwestern Miller. Furness, Withy & Co managed her until 1927, when Norddeutscher Lloyd bought her and renamed her Augsburg.

In 1940 the Japanese government bought Augsburg and renamed her Teiryu Maru. In 1944 a US Navy submarine sank her in the South China Sea, killing 149 of her passengers and crew.

== Building ==
The Northumberland Shipbuilding Company built Northwestern Miller at Howdon, Northumberland. She was launched on 19 October 1914 and completed in March 1915. Northumberland SB Co also built her sister ship Southwestern Miller, which was launched on 17 December 1914 and completed in June 1915.

Northwestern Miller's registered length was 419.8 feet (128.0 m), her beam was 53.4 ft (16.3 m) and her depth was 36.1 ft (11.0 m). As built, her tonnages were 6,504 gross register tons (GRT) and 4,095 net register tons (NRT).

Northwestern Miller had a single screw. It was driven by a three-cylinder triple expansion engine built by Richardsons Westgarth & Company of Hartlepool. It was rated at 682 nominal horsepower and gave her a speed of 12.5 knots (23.2 km/h; 14.4 mph).

== Furness, Withy service ==
Northwestern Miller and her sister ship were built for Norfolk & North American Steam Shipping Co Ltd, which since 1910 had been a subsidiary of Furness, Withy & Co. They were intended to bring grain from the Pacific coast of North America through the Panama Canal, which opened in August 1914.

Furness, Withy registered Northwestern Miller at Liverpool. She was given the UK official number 137431 and code letters JKGP.

Northwestern Miller survived the First World War. In 1920–21 Furness, Withy ran her in cargo liner service between London and New York.

== Norddeutscher Lloyd service ==
In 1927 Norddeutscher Lloyd bought both Northwestern Miller and Southwestern Miller, and renamed them Augsburg and Giessen respectively. Augsburg was registered in Bremen and given the German code letters QMGN.

NDL ran the two ships between Europe and the Far East. Giessen was wrecked in the East China Sea in 1929.

On 4 December 1932 Augsburg collided with the 4,680 GRT tanker Nord Atlantic in fog on the Weser.

In 1934 the new call sign DOEM superseded Augsburg's code letters.

On 24 August 1939 Augsburg reached Dairen in the Japanese-ruled Kwantung Leased Territory. On 3 September the United Kingdom entered the Second World War. Augsburg was laid up in Dairen to avoid the risk of being captured by the Royal Navy Far East Fleet.

On 23 February 1940 NDL sold Augsburg to the Batavier Line, which planned to rename her Vreeburgh. Batavier Line sent a crew from Rotterdam to take her over, but Germany invaded the Netherlands on 10 May, before the Dutch crew could reach Dairen. The sale seems to have fallen through.

== Japanese service ==
On 12 May 1940 the Japanese government bought Augsburg, apparently from NDL rather than Batavier Line. She was renamed Teiryu Maru and registered in Tokyo. On 5 December the government paid NDL $370,000 for her. On 3 February 1941 she was given the call sign JQQO. In 1941 her owner was recorded as Teikoku Kisen KK.

Teiryu Maryu took part in the Japanese invasion of the Philippines in December 1941 and invasion of the Dutch East Indies from January to March 1942. On one voyage in October 1942 she carried 5,693 troops. From November 1942 until May 1943 she supported Japanese forces that were occupying New Britain and invading New Guinea. She operated in the Japanese-occupied Philippines, visited Japanese-occupied Singapore and Malaya and Vichy French Indochina.

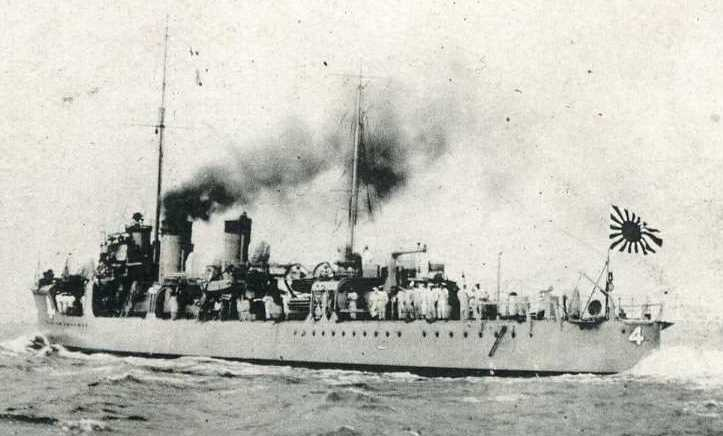
The Wakatake-class destroyer Kuretake escorted Convoy Yuta-9

On 21 June 1944, she loaded 550 POWs at Cebu arriving at Manila on 24 June. From 15 July 1944 Teiryu Maru was one of eight merchant ships in Convoy Yuta-9 from Sana bound for Takao in Japanese-ruled Taiwan. The Wakatake-class destroyer Kuretake and two auxiliary gunboats escorted the convoy.

On the morning of 19 July 1944 the Gato-class submarine USS Guardfish's radar found Yuta-9 in the South China Sea. At 0745 hrs JST Guardfish hit Teiryu Maru's port side with one torpedo, flooding her boiler room. At 0753 hrs Teiryu Maru broke in two and both parts sank. 108 passengers, 38 crew and three defensive gunners were killed.

Yuta-9's escorts counter-attacked with many depth charges, but Guardfish survived.

== Bibliography ==
- Burrell, David (1992). Furness Withy 1891–1991. Kendal: World Ship Society. ISBN 0-905617-70-3.
