= USS Guardfish (SS-217) =

Submarine of the United States

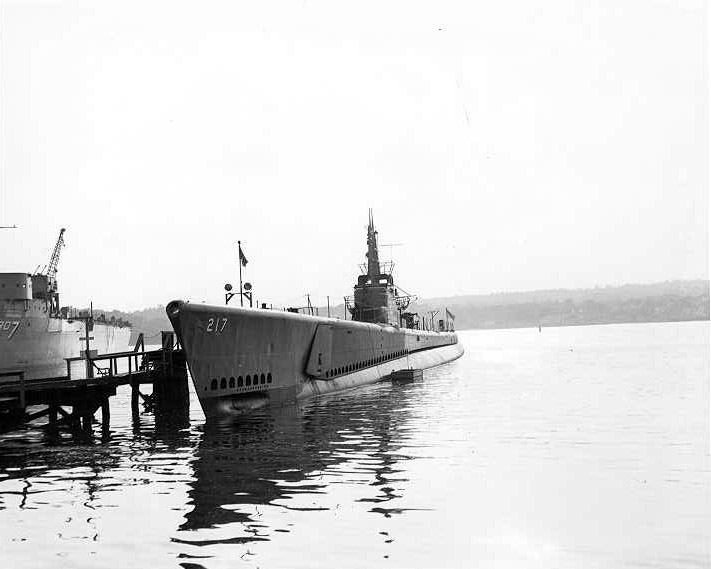
- Guardfish (SS-217) after launching.

History

United States
- Builder: Electric Boat Company, Groton, Connecticut
- Laid down: 1 April 1941
- Launched: 20 January 1942
- Sponsored by: Mrs Edward J Marquart
- Commissioned: 8 May 1942
- Decommissioned: 25 May 1946
- Stricken: 1 June 1960
- Fate: Sunk as a target off Block Island, 10 October 1961

General characteristics
- Class & type: Gato-class diesel-electric submarine
- Displacement: 1,525 long tons (1,549 t) surfaced; 2,424 long tons (2,463 t) submerged
- Length: 311 ft 9 in (95.02 m)
- Beam: 27 ft 3 in (8.31 m)
- Draft: 17 ft (5.2 m) maximum
- Propulsion: 4 × General Motors Model 16-248 V16 Diesel engines driving electric generators; 2 × 126-cell Sargo batteries; 4 × high-speed General Electric electric motors with reduction gears; two propellers; 5,400 shp (4.0 MW) surfaced; 2,740 shp (2.0 MW) submerged
- Speed: 21 knots (39 km/h) surfaced; 9 kn (17 km/h) submerged
- Range: 11,000 nautical miles (20,000 km) surfaced at 10 kn (19 km/h)
- Endurance: 48 hours at 2 kn (4 km/h) submerged; 75 days on patrol
- Test depth: 300 ft (90 m)
- Complement: 6 officers, 54 enlisted
- Armament: 10 × 21-inch (533 mm) torpedo tubes; 6 forward, 4 aft; 24 torpedoes; 1 × 3-inch (76 mm) / 50 caliber deck gun; Bofors 40 mm and Oerlikon 20 mm cannon

USS Guardfish (SS-217), a Gato-class submarine, was the first ship of the United States Navy to be named for the guardfish.

== Construction and commissioning ==
Guardfish was laid down by the Electric Boat Company at Groton, Connecticut. She was launched there on 20 January 1942, sponsored by Mrs. Edward J. Marquart, and commissioned at Naval Submarine Base New London New London, Connecticut, on 8 May 1942, Lieutenant Commander Thomas B. Klakring in command.

== First and second war patrols, August – November 1942 ==
After conducting shakedown out of New London, Guardfish left that base on 28 June 1942 for Pearl Harbor via the Panama Canal, and arrived there on 25 July to prepare for her first cruise. Her first war patrol was in previously unpatrolled waters off northeast Honshū. Guardfish left Pearl Harbor on 6 August 1942, sank a trawler on 22 August, and two days later sank 3,114 ton cargo ship Seikai Maru off Kinkasan Harbor. Evading escort vessels, she proceeded up the coast and found a convoy on 2 September. Guardfish attacked the next day, sinking 5,253 ton Kaimei Maru and 1,118 ton cargo ship Tenyu Maru. Chita Maru, a 2,376 ton freighter, retreated into the harbor and anchored, but a long-range shot from Guardfish left her beached in the mud. Guardfish returned from her successful first patrol to Midway for refit on 15 September 1942.

Guardfish left Midway on her second war patrol on 30 September and headed for the East China Sea. Surviving an attack by patrolling aircraft on 19 October, Guardfish closed a seven-ship convoy 21 October, sinking a 4,000-ton freighter and 6,362 ton Nichiho Maru north of Formosa as the convoy scattered. After evading pursuing aircraft and surface ships, Guardfish returned to Pearl Harbor on 28 November 1942. For her success on these first two patrols, Guardfish received a Presidential Unit Citation.

== Third, fourth, and fifth war patrols, January – August 1943 ==
Moving her base of operations to the Truk area, Guardfish left Pearl Harbor on 2 January 1943 to patrol off the Japanese stronghold. She sank Japanese patrol Boat No.1 (the former destroyer Shimakaze) on 12 January west of Kavieng, and a 1,300 ton cargo ship the next day. Attacked by the destroyer Hakaze on 23 January, Guardfish sank her with a well-placed torpedo. Moving south toward Rabaul, she attacked a large convoy near Simpson Harbor, but was driven off by concentrated shore fire and escort attacks. Guardfish ended her third patrol by arriving at Brisbane, Australia on 15 February 1943.

Her fourth war patrol was conducted in the Bismarcks, Solomons, and New Guinea area, and Guardfish recorded no kills on this cruise, 9 March to 30 April 1943.

Leaving Brisbane for the same waters on 25 May 1943, Guardfish sank the transport and hell ship, Suzuya Maru, and damaged another before being forced to dive by aircraft on 13 June. She picked up a surveying party on the west coast of Bougainville on 14 July and returned to Brisbane for refit on 2 August 1943.

== Sixth and seventh war patrols, August 1943 – February 1944 ==
Guardfish left Brisbane for her sixth war patrol on 24 August 1943, landing a reconnoitering party on Bougainville and then moving into cruising waters. She sank the 5,460 ton Kasha Maru on 8 October and subsequently spent two days as lifeguard ship during the air strikes on Rabaul. Guardfish embarked another reconnoitering party on 19 October at Tulagi, landed them on Bougainville, and took vital soundings in Empress Augusta Bay before re-embarking the Marine party on 28 October. These important missions were carried out two days before the American landings at Bougainville. Guardfish reached Brisbane, completing her sixth patrol on 3 November 1943.

On 3 December 1943 Guardfish was damaged in a collision with an unknown tanker.

Turning to the shipping lanes between Truk and Guadalcanal, Guardfish began her seventh war patrol on 27 December 1943, sinking 10,024 ton oiler Kenyo Maru on 14 January 1944. She then closed Truk and sank the destroyer Umikaze on 1 February in an attack on a convoy. After serving briefly as lifeguard ship off Truk she arrived at Pearl Harbor 18 February and from there returned to San Francisco for repairs nine days later.

== Eighth and ninth war patrols, June – October 1944 ==
Guardfish again put to sea from San Francisco and arrived at Pearl Harbor on 1 June. She then joined submarines Thresher, Piranha, and Apogon to form the coordinated attack group known as the "Mickey Finns", commanded by Captain W. V. O'Regan in Guardfish.

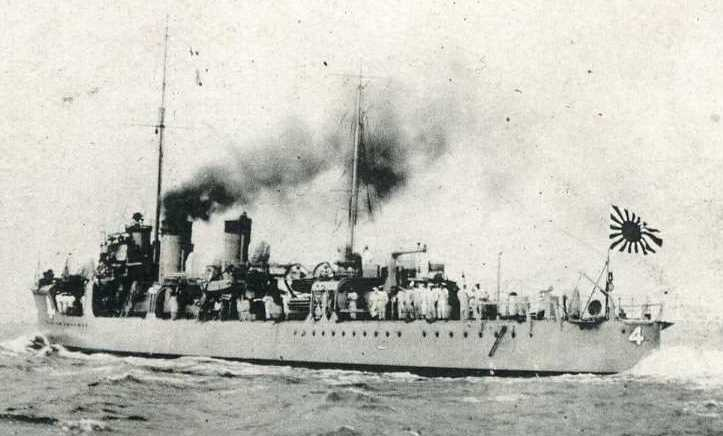
The Wakatake-class destroyer Kuretake escorted Teiryu Maru and tried to depth charge Guardfish

The submarines patrolled the shipping lanes around Formosa with spectacular success, Guardfish sinking 5,863 ton auxiliary Mantai Maru, 2,838 ton cargo ship Hizan Maru, and 5,215 ton cargo ship Jinsan Maru southwest of Formosa on 17 July. After damaging another freighter 18 July, Guardfish sank the 6,512 GRT cargo ship Teiryu Maru the next day, barely escaping the attacks of her escorts. She arrived at Midway for refit on 31 July 1944, and for her performance on the eighth patrol was awarded a second Presidential Unit Citation.

Sailing the Sea of Japan as a member of another wolf pack on 23 August 1944, Guardfish and the submarines, Thresher and Sunfish, had a 40-minute surface gun battle with sampans on 2 September. On 25 September Guardfish attacked and sank 873 ton cargo ship Miyakawa Maru #2 and returned to Pearl Harbor on 24 October 1944.

== Tenth, eleventh, and twelfth war patrols, November 1944 – June 1945 ==
Guardfish left on 26 November 1944 for her 10th war patrol to cruise in the "Convoy College" area of the South China Sea, with yet another wolf pack. She recorded no sinkings on this cruise, but nearing Guam in the early morning of 24 January 1945 she mistook the U.S. Navy rescue and salvage ship Extractor (ARS-15), for a Japanese I class submarine. She fired a torpedo which struck Extractor's starboard side, causing her to capsize and sink at 15°44′N 135°29′E, within five minutes. Six crew were killed, and the remainder were rescued by Guardfish. This action ended the patrol.

Guardfish's 11th war patrol was spent watching for enemy fleet units attempting to escape from the Inland Sea of Japan by way of the Kii Suido between Shikoku and Honshū. Leaving Saipan on this duty on 27 February, she found no ships but rescued two downed aviators on 19 March before returning to Midway on 11 April 1945.

Guardfish left Midway on 8 May 1945 on her 12th and final war patrol, and was assigned lifeguard station for the ever-increasing air attacks on the Japanese mainland. She sank a small trawler by gunfire on 16 June, and arrived back at Pearl Harbor on 26 June 1945.

== Post-war service ==
The veteran submarine served with the training command after her return to Hawaii, helping to train surface ships in the newest antisubmarine warfare tactics until 25 August 1945. She then sailed for the United States, transiting the Panama Canal on 12 September and arriving at New Orleans on 16 September. Guardfish arrived at New London 6 November and decommissioned there on 25 May 1946.

Guardfish remained inactive until 18 June 1948, when she was placed "in service" for duty as a Naval Reserve Training Ship at New London. Declared surplus to Navy needs, she was stricken from the Naval Vessel Register on 1 June 1960. This ship, one of the most successful of World War II submarines, performed her final service as a target ship for a new submarine torpedo. Blenny sank her with the newly developed torpedoes off New London on 10 October 1961.

== Honors and awards ==
- Presidential Unit Citation, two awards, one for her first and second war patrols, and a second for her eighth war patrol.
- Asiatic-Pacific Campaign Medal with 11 battle stars for World War II service

Of about 250 American submarines which conducted combat patrols in World War II, Guardfish ranked 13th in total tonnage sunk (72,424 tons) and tied for eighth in number of ships sunk with 19.

== In the media ==
Guardfish was the subject of an article in the 14 December 1942 edition of TIME magazine. The article, titled Battle of the Pacific: A Day at the Races and written by an embedded Times staff writer (Clay Blair?), describes the Guardfish, either the 1st or 2nd war patrol and Commander Klakring's famed sneak into Tokyo Bay; Close enough to watch the horse races through the periscope.

Excerpt from article – It was a Sunday afternoon. Lieut. Commander Thomas Burton Klakring had run his submarine smack up to Japan's shore. Klakring raised his periscope. There was a big seaside town, a race track and a race, which "the whole town" had turned out to see. Klakring & crew placed some bets, "but we were just a little too far away to be sure which horse won." Anyhow, they were there to provide more exciting diversion for the people of Japan.

Guardfish life on patrol was predominately displayed in the much longer article, featured in the 15 March 1943 publication of LIFE magazine. The article is titled West to Japan. US sub patrols the Japanese Coast, watches Horse-races and sinks 70,000 tons of Japanese shipping. By John Field. The article is over 4,000 words and depicts life aboard a submarine, both exciting and mundane. Byline: "This story has 50 heros and one heroine. The heros are the officers and men of an American submarine. The heroine is the ship herself. More than 300 ft. long, with ten torpedo tubes and a surface speed of better than 20 knots, she was commissioned about a year ago. Since that day, she has led an exciting and secret life. On one cruise, to the shores of Japan itself, she sank 70,000 tons of (enemy) shipping. This is the story of that cruise."

Guardfish was the subject of one episode of the syndicated television series The Silent Service

== See also ==
- List of most successful American submarines in World War II
