= USS Thresher (SS-200) =

Tambor class submarine

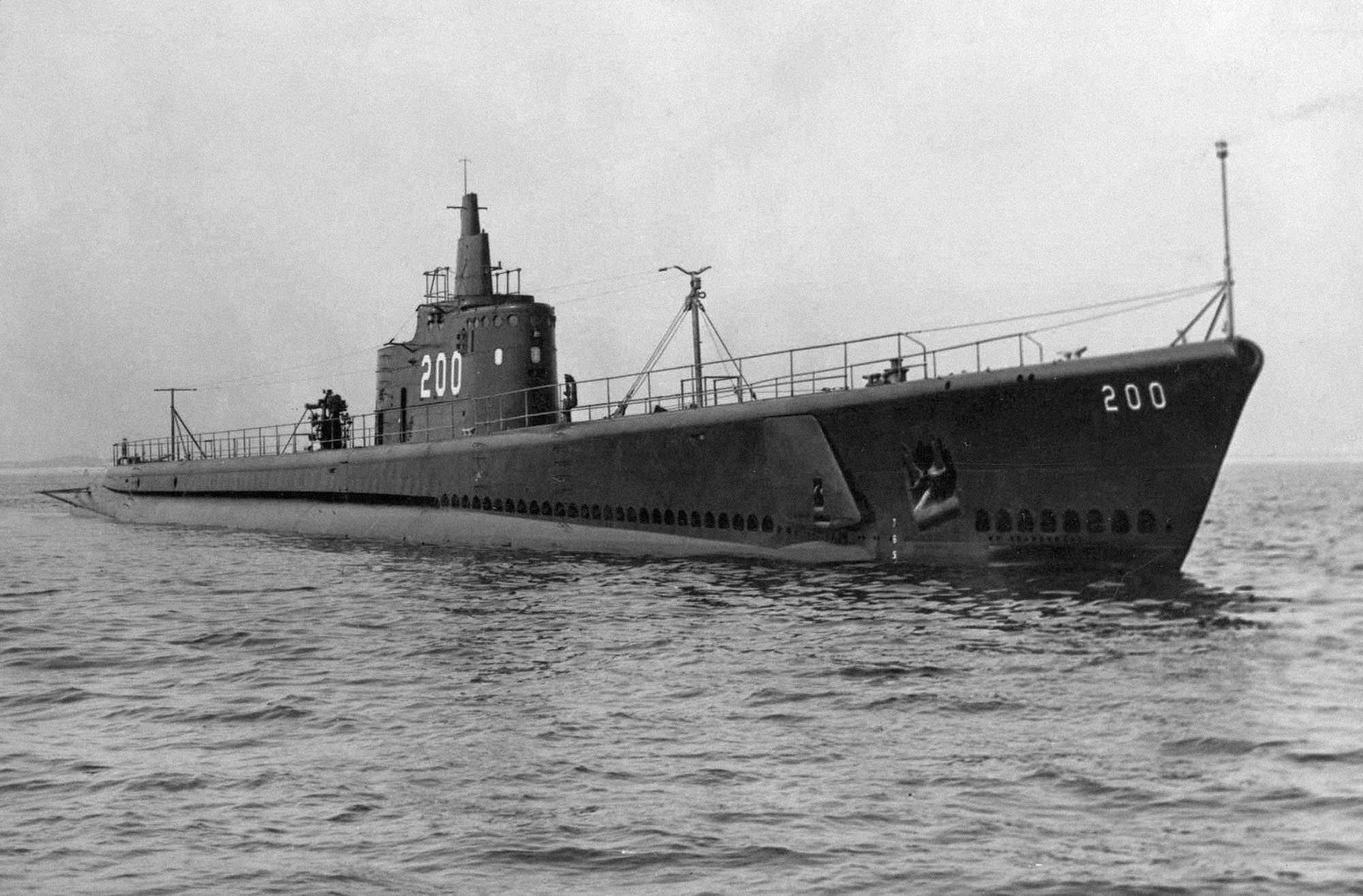
- Thresher as she appeared prewar, with hull number prominently displayed. Note also her conning tower has the large slab silhouette which would be rapidly reduced with wartime experience,

History

United States
- Builder: Electric Boat Company, Groton, Connecticut
- Laid down: 27 April 1939
- Launched: 27 March 1940
- Commissioned: 27 August 1940
- Decommissioned: 13 December 1945
- Honors and awards: 15 × battle stars; Navy Unit Commendation
- Recommissioned: 6 February 1946
- Decommissioned: 12 July 1946
- Stricken: 23 December 1947
- Fate: Sold for scrap, 18 March 1948

General characteristics
- Class & type: Tambor class diesel-electric submarine
- Displacement: 1,475 long tons (1,499 t) standard, surfaced; 2,370 long tons (2,410 t) submerged
- Length: 307 ft 2 in (93.62 m)
- Beam: 27 ft 3 in (8.31 m)
- Draft: 14 ft 7 1/2 in (4.458 m)
- Propulsion: 4 × General Motors Model 16-248 V16 Diesel engines driving electric generators; 2 × 126-cell Sargo batteries; 4 × high-speed General Electric electric motors with reduction gears; two propellers; 5,400 shp (4.0 MW) surfaced; 2,740 shp (2.0 MW) submerged
- Speed: 20.4 knots (38 km/h) surfaced; 8.75 knots (16 km/h) submerged
- Range: 11,000 nautical miles (20,000 km) at 10 knots (19 km/h)
- Endurance: 48 hours at 2 knots (3.7 km/h) submerged
- Test depth: 250 ft (76 m)
- Complement: 6 officers, 54 enlisted
- Armament: 10 × 21-inch (533 mm) torpedo tubes; 6 forward, 4 aft; 24 torpedoes; 1 × 3-inch (76 mm) / 50 caliber deck gun; Bofors 40 mm and Oerlikon 20 mm cannon
- Notes: 6th patrol and later: 3 inch gun replaced with 5"/51 caliber gun

USS Thresher (SS-200) was the most decorated United States Navy submarine of World War II, with 15 battle stars and a Navy Unit Commendation. Thresher was the third of twelve Tambor-class submarines that were commissioned. All twelve fought in the war, and she was one of the five who survived.

== Construction and commissioning ==
Thresher's keel was laid down on 27 May 1939 at the Electric Boat Company of Groton, Connecticut. She was launched on 27 March 1940, sponsored by Mrs. Margaret Cox Jones, wife of Rear Admiral Claud A. Jones and commissioned on 27 August 1940, with Lieutenant Commander William Lovett Anderson in command.

== August 1940–December 1941 ==
Following training and sea trials, Thresher got underway from New London, Connecticut on 25 October 1940 for engineering trials in Gravesend Bay, New York, and shakedown off the Dry Tortugas.

She operated along the United States East Coast into 1941. She departed on 1 May 1941 for the Caribbean Sea, transiting the Panama Canal on 9 May, stopping in San Diego, California, through 21 May, and arriving at Pearl Harbor, Hawaii, on 31 May. She operated from the Hawaiian Islands into the fall of 1941, as tensions rose in the Far East and the United States prepared for war in both the Pacific and Atlantic Oceans.

Thresher and her sister ship USS Tautog (SS-199) departed Submarine Base Pearl Harbor on 31 October 1941 on a simulated war patrol north of Midway Atoll in the Northwestern Hawaiian Islands. Both carried live torpedoes. Tautog returned first, and on 7 December 1941 Thresher neared the main Hawaiian Islands to end her cruise. Escorted by the destroyer USS Litchfield (DD-336) through Hawaiian waters lest she be mistaken for a hostile submarine, Thresher received word at 08:10 that Pearl Harbor was under attack by Japanese aircraft.

== Patrols ==
=== First and second ===
Litchfield promptly set off to join American light forces departing from the harbor, leaving Thresher alone to conduct her first real war patrol. However, the destroyer was ordered back to escort; radio contact was established, and a rendezvous arranged with Thresher. At the pre-appointed time, Thresher poked up her periscope to have a look, and noticed a ship appearing similar to Litchfield approaching bows-on. This was in actuality the minelayer USS Gamble (DM-15), which, having mistaken the Thresher for a Japanese submarine, opened fire on her as soon as her black conning tower broke the surface, forcing Thresher to immediately submerge again. She again tried to enter the harbor on 8 December, but was driven off by depth-bombs from a patrol plane, before Thornton (AVD-11) finally arrived to provide safe conduct for the boat at midday.

Departing Pearl Harbor on 30 December 1941, Thresher headed for the Marshall and Mariana Islands. Reconnoitering Majuro, Arno, and Mili atolls from 9 to 13 January 1942, she shifted to waters off Japanese-held Guam in the early morning darkness of 4 February. A little before daybreak, a small freighter was sighted 7 miles (11 km) north of Agana Harbor and Thresher closed for the attack. She loosed a three-torpedo spread, holing the ship and sending it down by the bow and dead in the water. Thresher then fired another spread of torpedoes, but all missed. Upon returning to the scene one-half-hour later, the ship was gone and Thresher thought she had scored a kill; postwar accounting did not substantiate it.

While en route home to Pearl Harbor on 24 February, an overzealous Navy plane attacked Thresher but did no damage, and the sub safely returned to port on 26 February.

=== Third and fourth ===
After refit, Thresher departed 23 March 1942 for a patrol area near the Japanese home islands. There, she was to gather weather data off Honshū for use by Admiral William Halsey's task force (the carriers Enterprise (CV-6) and Hornet (CV-8), then approaching Japan. Embarked in Hornet were 16 United States Army Air Forces North American B-25 Mitchell medium bombers, under the command of Lieutenant Colonel James H. Doolittle, intended to attack Tokyo on 18 April.

Warned by ULTRA of four Japanese submarines operating off Tokyo Bay, Thresher was detected by one of them and fired on, without damage.

On the morning of 10 April, Thresher sighted a large Japanese freighter. A three-torpedo spread was fired and all missed as the target escaped in the mist. When the target emerged from the murk, Thresher was not in a position to launch another attack and proceeded on her way.

A second target was sighted later that day, and this time the hunting was better. One torpedo broke the back of the freighter Sado Maru (3,000 tons) off Yokohama, sending it to the bottom in less than three minutes. The subsequent depth charge attack was delivered by three or four patrol vessels (one of the most severe of the war), causing Thresher to lose depth control and she plunged to 400 feet (120 m), which was below her test depth, before control was regained. She then disobeyed orders and remained to assist Halsey.

On 13 April, running on the surface to recharge her batteries, Thresher took a wave over her conning tower. Water cascaded down the open hatch and rushed into the boat, shorting many electrical circuits. For a short time, there was a significant danger that chlorine gas would be released, but quick thinking and damage control prevented any hazard. Eventually, all shorts were repaired and the boat pumped out.

The next day, Thresher departed her assigned patrol area and turned her attention to gathering weather data. She conducted periscope patrols in the advance screen of Halsey's task force, searching for any enemy craft that could warn the Japanese homeland. She was detached from this duty on 16 April and, after evading two Japanese patrol planes, returned to Pearl Harbor on 29 April.

On 26 June 1942, Thresher commenced her fourth war patrol heading for waters between the Palau and the Marshall Islands. On 6 July, one torpedo struck home during an attack on a tanker off Enijun Pass. Two surface escorts were soon joined by aircraft and, after a three-hour depth charging, Thresher was able to resume her search for other targets.

Three days later, midway between Kwajalein and Wotje atolls, Thresher fired two torpedoes at a 4,836 ton torpedo boat tender which caused tremendous explosions as the tender sank beneath the waves. Thresher withdrew from expected countermeasures. Within an hour, two depth charges shook the boat, and ten minutes later, a banging and clanking alerted her to the fact that the Japanese were apparently bringing a large grapnel into play in an attempt to capture the boat.

Applying full right rudder, Thresher made a 10‑minute high-speed run which shook her free from the giant hook. Then, as a depth charge exploded near her conning tower, the boat went deeper. With a bending and twisting turn, Thresher left the enemy behind, with some 30-odd depth charges exploding in her wake. Shaken but not seriously damaged, Thresher made minor repairs as she headed for Truk to reconnoiter the passes leading into this enemy naval bastion.

Missing a freighter with torpedoes on the night of 20 July, Thresher surfaced in a rain squall before daybreak the next morning. The boat's sonar picked up the sound of screws, close and closing. Soon an enemy patrol craft came into view, on a collision course. Surprisingly, the Japanese chose not to ram, but instead turned hard right and came to a parallel course some 50 yards (46 m) away. Thresher went deep, while the enemy's guns fired close but ineffective salvoes into the water ahead of the disappearing boat.

After escaping to the Palaus, Thresher tangled with an enemy Q-ship off Ambon in the former Netherlands East Indies. The two torpedoes she fired at the enemy failed to explode, and the Q-ship subjected Thresher to a salvo of eight depth charges before giving up the attack. Since she had been reassigned to the Southwest Pacific Submarine Force, Thresher sailed away from this encounter en route to Australian waters and terminated her fourth war patrol at Fremantle on 15 August.

=== Fifth and sixth ===
After refit, Thresher loaded mines and departed Fremantle on 15 September 1942, bound for the Gulf of Siam. She fired torpedoes at two freighters north of Lombok Strait on 19 September but was unable to determine the results of her attacks. On the night of 25 September, luck again failed to smile on her as a single torpedo streaked beneath a large, high-speed target in the Sulu Sea.

Thresher later surfaced at 23:00 and proceeded on a course which took her north to Pearl Bank. There, in the northernmost reaches of the Gulf of Siam, she laid one of the first mine fields by a submarine in the Pacific War. These strategic mine fields laid by Thresher and her sisters in subsequent patrols covered Japanese shipping lanes in areas of the Southwest Pacific Command previously unpatrolled by submarines. Later, these minefields filled the gap between patrol zones along the coastal waters of Malaya, Siam, and Indochina, when many boats were diverted to participate in the Solomon Islands campaign.

While reconnoitering off Balikpapan, Borneo, and the Celebes coast, Thresher sighted a tanker aground on a reef off Kapoposang Island in the Java Sea. She soon surfaced for a deck gun attack, leaving the enemy ship with its decks awash. The boat then returned to Fremantle on 12 November for refit.

Underway from Fremantle on 16 December 1942, she arrived off Soerabaya, Java, on 25 December. She intercepted a convoy of freighters, escorted by two destroyers, several subchasers, and two aircraft. Slipping past the escorts, Thresher sent five torpedoes towards the leading three ships. Two successive explosions followed. Rising to periscope depth, the boat observed the second ship in the column down by the bow, with her stern up in the air and her screws, still revolving, out of the water. A second ship lay dead in the water, enveloped in smoke. Escaping unscathed from this tangle with a coastal convoy, Thresher sighted an enemy aircraft carrier the next night, but was picked up by escorts and held at bay for more than an hour while the tempting target faded into the night.

On the night of 29 December 1942, Thresher (now in the hands of William J. "Moke" Millican, Class of 1928) made contact with a 3,000-ton freighter. Just before midnight, she fired a spread of torpedoes at the cargo ship, but all missed or ran too deep. Undaunted, she waited for the moonrise and then surfaced to use her deck gun. Outmaneuvering the enemy, who tried to ram her, Thresher scored eight hits in succession with her 5 inches (130 mm) main gun, where her target probably sank in the shallow water, one of the few sunk entirely by deck guns.

=== Seventh ===
After arriving back in Fremantle on 10 January 1943, the boat got underway 15 days later for her seventh war patrol, with four torpedoes short of a normal load. At 11:00 on 14 February, Thresher made contact with a Japanese I-65 class submarine east of Thwartway Island. She launched two torpedoes; one was a dud, and the other exploded on the ocean bottom. Turning north and firing deck guns, Thresher's adversary soon disappeared over the horizon.

Proceeding to the Flores Sea, Thresher intercepted a three-ship convoy escorted by two anti-submarine vessels on 21 February. One of the sub's two torpedoes hit the stern of a transport. Thresher then evaded 13 depth charges before returning to periscope depth a little more than an hour later. She observed her target lying dead in the water while barges lightered troops to an undamaged mate. As escorts searched the waters nearby, Thresher closed and torpedoed the second transport, which had stopped to transfer survivors. Two loud explosions reverberated in the background as the boat dived to avoid possible countermeasures.

The following day, Thresher returned to celebrate Washington's Birthday by finishing off the first transport, which jack-knifed into a "V" shape and sank within three minutes.

Thresher prowled for more game and came upon a tanker and a freighter on 2 March. A single torpedo hit the 5,232-ton tanker, and it sank. The freighter, sighting torpedo wakes, took evasive action to avoid being hit. Then, a nearby escort arrived on the scene and kept Thresher at bay while the target escaped. The boat subsequently concluded this patrol, arriving at Fremantle on 10 March.

On her return to base, her skipper roundly criticized the torpedoes, especially the failure to sink the I-boat. Admiral Ralph W. Christie denied it and relieved him.

=== Eighth and ninth ===
Her eighth war patrol (commanded by Harry Hull, Class of 1932), lasting 4 April to 23 May 1943, was uneventful, but her ninth saw the boat score another kill. Off Balikpapan, Borneo, she sighted a three-ship convoy, escorted by a sole destroyer (Hokaze) on the night of 30 June 1943. After an unrewarding try with a trio of torpedoes, Thresher dodged the escort's depth-charging attack and returned for another attempt. Tracking with radar, Thresher set a tanker ablaze from stem to stern and scored hits on a 5,274-ton passenger freighter in the Makassar Strait.

Heading for Tambu Bay on the morning of 5 July, Thresher tracked a tanker. Chasing her quarry along the Sulawesi (Celebes) coast, the submarine lurked nearby until the escort left. Thresher then closed, loosed three torpedoes, and scored one hit on the bow of the enemy vessel. This blow failed to stop the tanker, which fired her guns to keep Thresher at bay as she escaped at high speed.

Four days later, Thresher arrived off Catmou Point, Negros Island. Under cover of darkness, the boat surfaced and delivered 500 pounds (230 kg) of stores and 40,000 rounds of ammunition to Filipino guerrillas. Receiving intelligence documents in return, Thresher got underway for a resumption of her patrol shortly before midnight on 9 July. She soon departed the Philippines and sailed via Midway Island and Pearl Harbor to the west coast for a major overhaul at the Mare Island Naval Shipyard, Vallejo, California.

=== Tenth ===
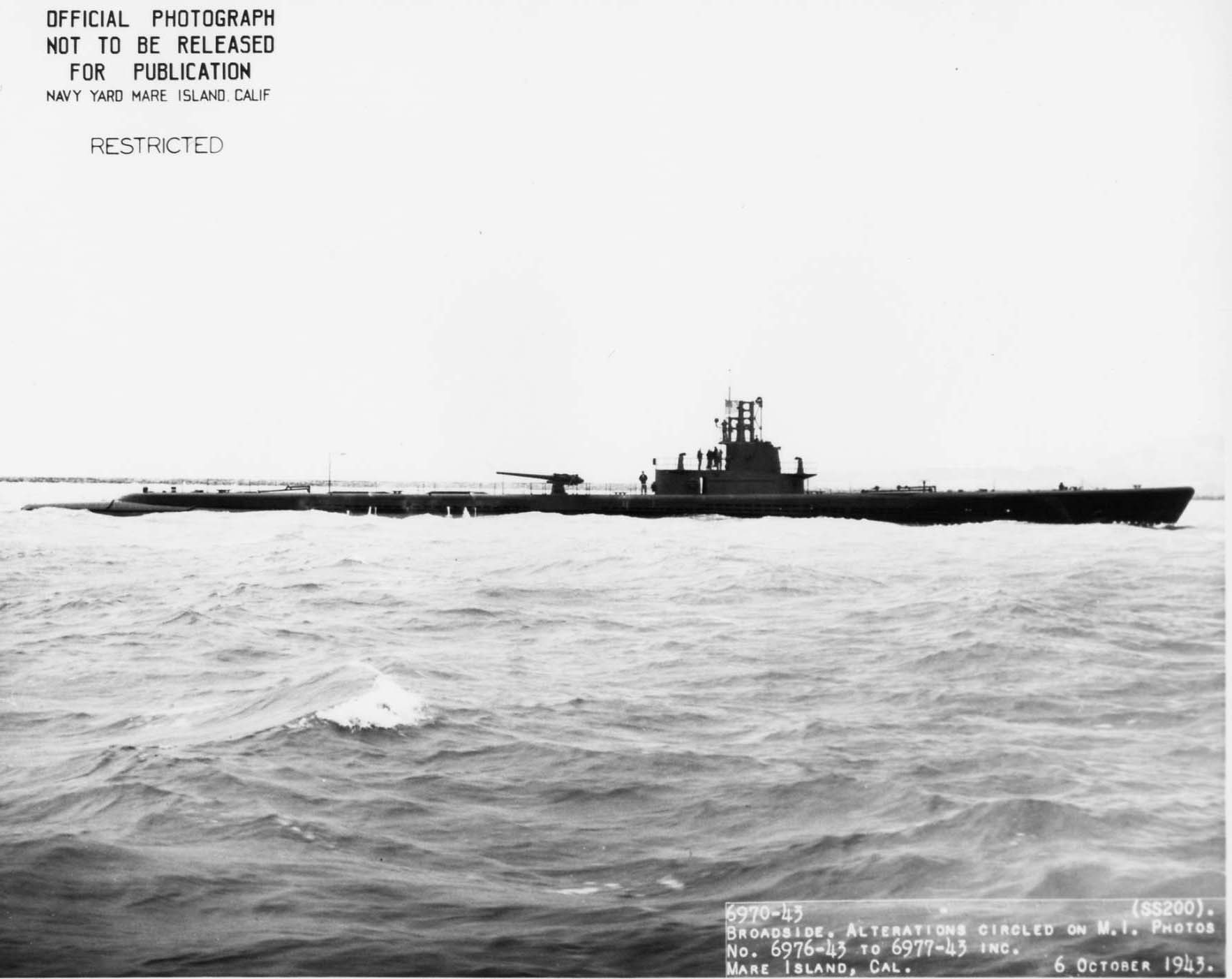
USS Thresher following refitting in the summer of 1943.

Newly refitted and again commanded by Harry Hull, Thresher departed the west coast on 8 October 1943 and arrived at Pearl Harbor one week later; she commenced her tenth war patrol on 1 November, bound for the waters north of the Caroline Islands. Prowling north of Truk, Thresher commenced tracking a five-ship convoy on the morning of 12 November and slipped past two escorts shortly before midnight.

She fired three torpedoes into a 4,862-ton transport. The next attack, another three torpedoes, missed their mark. Escorting antisubmarine craft hunted in vain for the American attacker, dropping 20 depth charges in a harassing barrage.

=== Eleventh and twelfth ===
Thresher’s 11th war patrol (this one under the command of Duncan C. MacMillan, Class of 1926) took her to the South China Sea south of Formosa. While cruising on the surface on 10 January 1944, Thresher sighted a pair of masts, low on the horizon, and quickly dove to avoid possible detection. Coming to periscope depth soon thereafter, she approached cautiously, keeping in mind the ship may have been the advance screen of a convoy. The contact proved to be a 150-ton trawler. Thresher battle-surfaced, commencing fire at 6,000 yards (5,500 m); the trawler sank after Thresher expended 45 5 inches (130 mm) shells, 1,000 rounds of .50 cal (12.7 mm); and 770 20 millimetres (0.79 in) rounds.

Thresher next set course for the Luzon Strait, between Batan Island and Luzon, in the Philippines. At 11:43 on 15 January, she came to the surface and spotted a Japanese aircraft carrier with an escorting destroyer soon thereafter. The boat submerged to periscope depth in time to observe two enemy destroyers rapidly approaching. With insufficient time to maneuver for a "down the throat" shot, Thresher went deep and rigged for silent running. The destroyer churned overhead and dropped four depth charges, none close. After remaining overhead two hours, dropping between ten and fifteen more depth charges, the enemy finally turned away, leaving Thresher unscathed.

Again coming to periscope depth at 17:00, Thresher soon sighted a four-ship convoy at 12,000 yards (11,000 m) with a single sub-chaser as escort. Surfacing at 19:11, Thresher began the chase, tracking the convoy by radar. The three leading targets steamed in column, with the escort between the third and fourth merchantmen. Thresher maneuvered to the west to silhouette the targets against the rising moon. The convoy changed course at 21:55, giving Thresher an excellent setup for her stern tubes. At 22:07, the boat let fly four torpedoes at the lead ship, a 6,960-ton freighter, from 1,800 yards (1,600 m). Thresher observed two hits, and the vessel, its bow in the air, was observed in a sinking condition.

Thresher next fired three bow tubes at the second target, a 4,092 ton freighter. Three torpedoes struck the freighter and literally blew her to pieces. The oil cargo burst into flames, illuminating the night as brightly as day.

The third ship started firing on Thresher with deck guns, passing down the port side at 800 yards (730 m). With the submarine now readily visible, and her stern tubes dry, Thresher dove as bullets from the approaching escort splashed nearby. Thresher counted some 20 explosions from depth charges before the patrol craft left an hour later. Upon surfacing, Thresher was again alone and set off to patrol along the Singapore-to-Japan trade route.

On 26 January, Thresher made radar contact with a small convoy and soon spotted two ships steaming along beneath the overcast night skies. At 00:11, Thresher fired three bow torpedoes at a 1,266-ton freighter, then cleared the area. Her "fish" scored a bullseye, and the quarry disappeared within a minute. A second spread, 35 seconds after the first, claimed a 2,205-ton freighter. A third target made off to the south at high speed, "spraying the ocean with five-inch ammunition". Resuming the approach at 00:20, Thresher doggedly tailed the Japanese ship for four hours before reaching a favorable attack position. Firing her last torpedoes at 04:46, Thresher began to build up speed and had just commenced a turn when one torpedo struck the enemy ship, causing a tremendous explosion. The blast slowed the freighter, but its tremendous concussion stopped Thresher dead in the water. All four main engine overspeed trips were actuated; cork insulation flew; lights broke; clocks stopped; and water poured down the antenna trunk. By the time Thresher regained battle readiness, the enemy was too far away to encourage further pursuit. Well within the range of shore-based aircraft, Thresher quit the chase. Escorts, alerted to the fact that an American submarine was prowling in the vicinity, arrived on the scene and conducted a three-hour-long, futile depth-charging.

On 28 and 29 January, Thresher patrolled the Formosa-to-Palau route, in the Luzon Strait, before returning via Midway Island to Pearl Harbor, where she arrived on 18 February. There, Lieutenant Commander MacMillan was awarded the Navy Cross for his aggressive action during the patrol.

Thresher went to sea again on 18 March 1944, departing Pearl Harbor for the central Caroline Islands. She remained on air-sea rescue ("lifeguard") station during American carrier strikes on Truk, bombarded Oroluk Atoll on 11 April, and photographed islands in that group. The boat played "hide and seek" with numerous enemy aircraft and witnessed several American bombing raids on Truk. She sighted only two enemy ships and was unable to attack either before she returned to Pearl Harbor on 8 May.

=== Thirteenth ===
On 14 June 1944, Thresher headed out for her 13th war patrol, again commanded by MacMillan. On 25 June, she joined a "wolfpack" that also included Apogon (SS-308), Guardfish (SS-217), and Piranha (SS-389). Nicknamed the "Mickey Finns" and under the overall command of Captain William V. "Mickey" O'Regan (flying his flag in Guardfish), the group picked up "ditching signals" from a downed aircraft that afternoon and changed course to investigate. Arriving in the vicinity on 27 June, they found only a drop tank and no trace of plane or pilot.

Over the succeeding days, the boats observed several planes but contacted only a few fishing vessels and small patrol craft. This drought of targets continued until 11 July, when Thresher made radar contact with a group of six ships steaming on the Formosa-Luzon route. As she changed course to intercept, she dispatched contact reports to the other boats. Guardfish and Apogon picked up the contact, but Piranha could not. Thresher deployed to a position 15,000 yards (14,000 m) astern of the convoy, to trail the enemy group and be ready to pick off stragglers. Guardfish took the enemy's port flank, and Apogon maneuvered to the convoy's starboard quarter.

A Japanese escort latched on to Thresher, however, and trailed her, depriving her of a chance to attack the convoy. Meanwhile, Piranha managed to sink a 6,504-ton passenger/cargo ship. Apogon was rammed and forced to return to base for repairs.

Rendezvousing on 13 July, the remaining boats resumed the hunt. At 16:00 on 16 July, Thresher sighted smoke on the horizon. She surfaced and dispatched a contact report. After a cat-and-mouse period of some two hours, she noted the convoy consisted of six ships: a large tanker, three freighters, and two escorts.

Thresher closed beneath a clear and dark night sky. At 23:29, with the range to the near escort at 2,000 yards (1,800 m), she commenced fire. Three torpedoes sped from the forward tubes toward the lead escort, three to the first freighter. Thresher then turned and emptied all four stern tubes at the second freighter. Four explosions were sighted, and as Thresher departed at high speed, another six soon after.

Commencing a reload of her tubes at midnight (00.00 or 24.00), Thresher returned to the area and continued the attack on the convoy, which consisted now of only three ships: a freighter, the oiler, and an escort. At 01:18, Thresher fired two bow tubes at the escort and three at the leading freighter; the sub then fired her stern tubes at the oiler. Soon thereafter, Thresher heard at least six explosions. The escort promptly began a depth charge barrage. Returning to periscope depth, Thresher found the convoy had remained stubbornly afloat. She began reloading her tubes again at 01.22 and returned to the chase.

While tube number six was still being reloaded, Thresher fired two other bow tubes at the freighter, two more at the oiler, and the remaining full one at the escort; she then swung about and fired one stern tube at the latter. Two torpedoes exploded at 02:46, and the cargo ship sank immediately. One minute later, two "fish" struck the oiler. A tremendous explosion lighted the entire sky, and the ship sank within 15 seconds.

While it could not be ascertained whether or not the last escort went down, the effect of two torpedo hits made it likely he had been heavily damaged. All torpedoes expended, Thresher headed for Midway. The boat claimed to have destroyed the entire convoy, but a post-war assessment confirmed only two cargo vessels, Sainei Maru (4,916 tons) and Shozan Maru (2,838 tons), and no escort. Thresher did, however, receive the Navy Unit Commendation for the patrol, and MacMillan received his second Navy Cross.

=== Fourteenth ===
Upon completion of voyage repairs (and with John R. Middleton Jr., Class of 1935, now at the helm), Thresher stood out of Midway on 23 August 1944, bound for the Yellow Sea and East China Sea on her fourteenth war patrol. Six days later, while cruising on the surface, Thresher was battered by heavy seas which caused the boat to roll some 53 degrees from the vertical and produced waves up to 50 feet (15 m) high.

Rounding the southern tip of Kyūshū, Thresher sighted several small craft before making contact with a minelayer and two subchasers on 10 September. Clearing the vicinity at high speed, Thresher headed for a new patrol area.

Thresher was twice frustrated on 13 September, when a large oiler passed far out of reach and a freighter, attacked with four torpedoes, refused to sink. An escorting aircraft harried the boat, preventing any further attacks.

At 15:31 on 18 September, Thresher sighted the masts, funnel and bridge of a ship on the horizon. After determining the enemy's base course and zigzag plan, Thresher surfaced and locked on the freighter with radar at 19:23. Another pip, an escort vessel, soon appeared on radar.

By 21:00, Thresher had maneuvered into position off the enemy's port bow and waited for the Japanese ships to make a zig which would place her at a desirable point for the attack. Thresher closed in for the kill and loosed four torpedoes as the group turned to the right. The Japanese, however, did not meet her prediction, and the first spread ran wide of its targets. Still undetected, Thresher quickly came about and fired four stern "fish" from 1,200 yards (1,100 m). The second spread ran true, hitting 6,854-ton freighter Gyōkū Maru. The explosions broke the cargoman's back, and she quickly slipped from sight. Thresher retired at high speed when she detected the presence of three additional ships closing rapidly.

Thresher reloaded and turned upon her pursuers, launching a spread of torpedoes which barely missed. She evaded her hunters and shifted to waters off Manchuria. The boat sighted only fishing craft until 26 August, when a large cargo vessel hove into sight at 09:44. Thresher surfaced at 13:15 and headed for the nearest point on the enemy's zigzag course. An hour later, the submarine spotted a floatplane on patrol, and hurriedly dived. As she went deep, one depth charge exploded nearby.

Staying under until 16:00, Thresher came to the surface and reacquired her target at 18:15. Tracking until sunset, she postulated the enemy vessel was bound for Daisei Gunto, and an intercept course was plotted accordingly. Attacking from the bright moon side, Thresher fired two bow tubes, aiming one torpedo at the hull near the mainmast and one at the foremast. Both struck home, and the 1,468-ton freighter broke up and sank within a minute.

The following day, 26 September, Thresher came upon a 5,000-ton oiler and cut loose with four stern tubes from a range of 4,000 yards (3,700 m). Those on the bridge saw the target disappear within a minute. Tubes dry, Thresher headed for Midway. En route, on 3 October, she sighted, tracked, and approached a small trawler. After sunset, Thresher surfaced and manned her deck guns. After firing 27 rounds of five-inch ammunition, the boat soon received close return fire which forced her to back off. Too dark to see the target, Thresher resumed her passage to Midway.

After fueling at Midway on 8 October, Thresher sailed for the Hawaiian Islands and arrived at Pearl Harbor on 12 October 1944. Following a lengthy refit, Thresher got underway on 31 January 1945 for the Marianas, in company with Tilefish (SS-307), Shad (SS-235), and Peto (SS-265). Remaining at Saipan overnight on 12–13 February, the impromptu wolf pack pushed on toward its assigned patrol areas north of Luzon. However, only two of Thresher's contacts developed into attacks. One failed due to the target's shallow draft, and the second contact evaded. Thresher did, however, conduct air-sea guard patrols; and conducted a shore bombardment of Basco Harbor, Batan Island, on 28 March. The latter part of this patrol was conducted in company with Piranha and Puffer (SS-268).

== End of active duty ==
Clearing her patrol station, Thresher nested alongside Fulton (AS-11) for voyage repairs before pushing on for Oahu on 4 April 1945. Arriving at Pearl Harbor 20 days later, Thresher ended her active combat service, after fifteen war patrols. Undergoing a routine refit and voyage repairs, Thresher subsequently rendered target training services out of Pearl Harbor and Eniwetok. She was operating out of the latter base on 15 August 1945 when the war in the Pacific ended.

Thresher cleared Eniwetok on 15 September, arrived at Pearl Harbor on 22 September, and stood out to sea on 26 September. Making port at San Francisco, on 4 October, the boat subsequently left the West Coast on 31 October. She transited the Panama Canal on 10 November and arrived at Portsmouth, New Hampshire, on 18 November. She was decommissioned there on 13 December 1945.

Thresher was recommissioned on 6 February 1946 to be used as a target during atomic bomb test at Bikini Atoll in the Pacific. However, during the refurbishing, it was decided she had deteriorated beyond economical repair, and work was stopped. Thresher was decommissioned for the final time on 12 July 1946. She was stricken from the Naval Vessel Register on 23 December 1947, and on 18 March 1948 sold for scrap to Max Siegel of Everett, Massachusetts.

== Honors and awards ==
- Navy Unit Commendation for World War II service
- Asiatic-Pacific Campaign Medal with 15 battle stars for World War II service

Thresher was the most decorated U.S. submarine and among the most decorated U.S. ships of World War II.

== In culture ==
Thresher is the subject of the third episode of the first season of syndicated television anthology series The Silent Service. The episode, entitled "The End of the Line," aired 5 Apr 1957. It portrayed the Japanese attempt to grab Thresher with a grappling hook when she was off Kwajalein in July 1942.

Thresher was also the subject of the sixth episode of the second season of syndicated television anthology series The Silent Service. The episode, entitled "The Thresher Story," recounts the events of firing her 3" gun on her Fifth war patrol and being subsequently refitted with "an old relic," a 5"/51 (which had entered service in 1911).

== Notes ==
Attribution:
