= USS Apogon =

Balao-class submarine

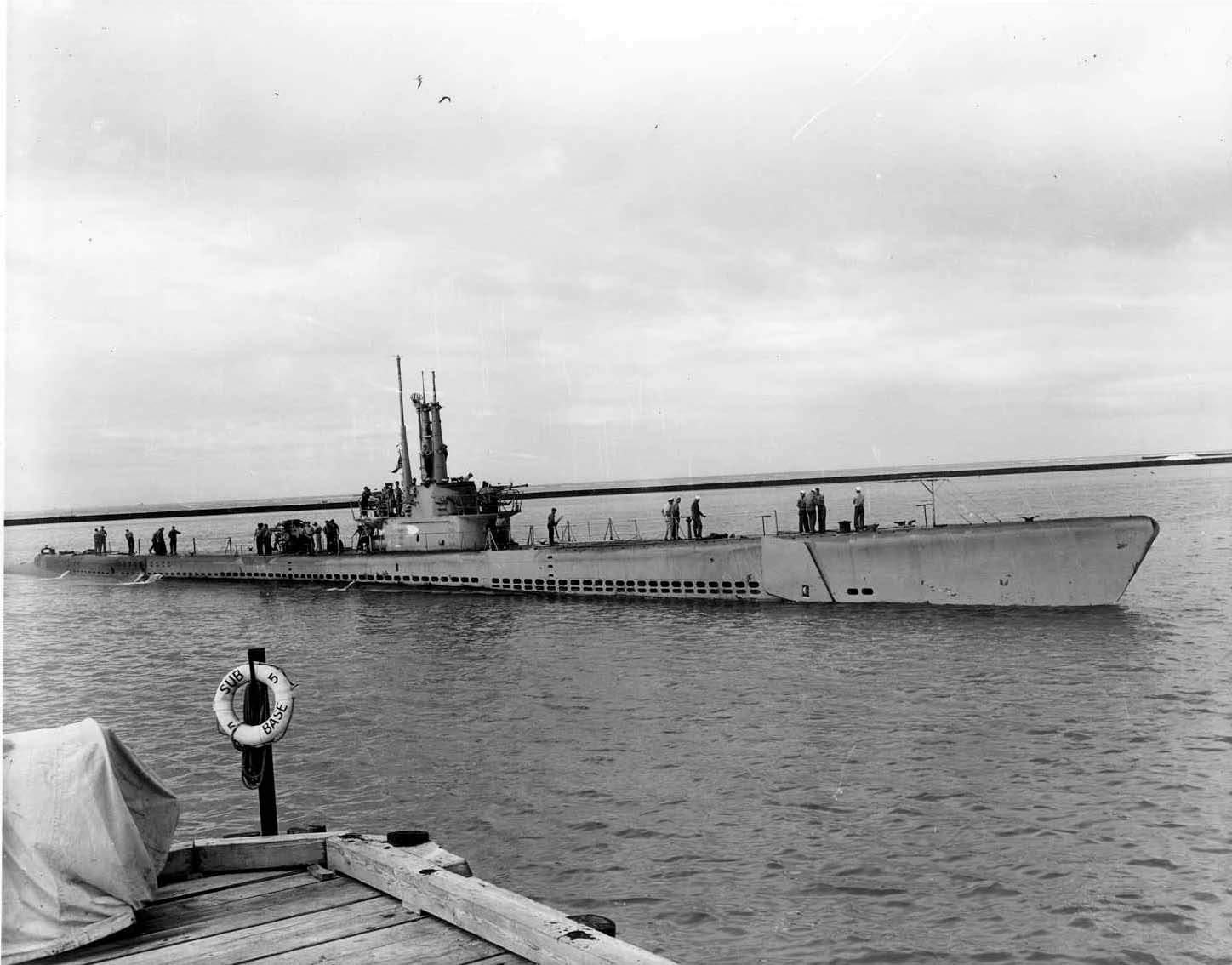
- USS Apogon (SS-308) heads towards dock at Submarine Base 5.

History

United States
- Builder: Portsmouth Naval Shipyard, Kittery, Maine
- Laid down: 9 December 1942
- Launched: 10 March 1943
- Commissioned: 16 July 1943
- Decommissioned: 1 October 1945
- Stricken: 25 February 1947
- Fate: Used as a target for the Operation Crossroads atomic bomb test on 25 July 1946, and sunk

General characteristics
- Class & type: Balao class diesel-electric submarine
- Displacement: 1,526 tons (1,550 t) surfaced, 2,391 tons (2,429 t) submerged
- Length: 311 ft 6 in (94.95 m)
- Beam: 27 ft 3 in (8.31 m)
- Draft: 16 ft 10 in (5.13 m) maximum
- Propulsion: 4 × Fairbanks-Morse Model 38D8-1/8 9-cylinder opposed-piston diesel engines driving electrical generators; 2 × 126-cell Sargo batteries; 4 × high-speed Elliott electric motors with reduction gears; 2 × propellers; 5,400 shp (4.0 MW) surfaced; 2,740 shp (2.04 MW) submerged
- Speed: 20.25 kn (37.50 km/h) surfaced, 8.75 kn (16.21 km/h) submerged
- Range: 11,000 nmi (20,000 km) surfaced @ 10 kn (19 km/h)
- Endurance: 48 hours @ 2 kn (3.7 km/h) submerged, 75 days on patrol
- Test depth: 400 ft (120 m)
- Complement: 10 officers, 70–71 enlisted
- Armament: 10 × 21-inch (533 mm) torpedo tubes; 6 forward, 4 aft; 24 torpedoes; 1 × 5-inch (127 mm) / 25 caliber deck gun; Bofors 40 mm and Oerlikon 20 mm cannon

USS Apogon (SS-308), a Balao-class submarine, was a ship of the United States Navy named for the apogons, a genus of cardinalfishes found in tropical and subtropical waters. The original name planned for the ship was Abadejo, but the name was changed on 24 September 1942 before the keel was laid down.

== Construction and commissioning ==
Apogon was laid down on 9 December 1942, by the Portsmouth Navy Yard in Kittery, Maine; launched on 10 March 1943; sponsored by Mrs. Helen Lorena Withers (née LaBar), wife of Admiral Thomas Withers Jr., then Commander of Submarine Forces; and commissioned on 16 July 1943.

== Service history ==
=== World War II ===
The submarine held shakedown in the waters off the New England coast and departed New London on 13 September, bound for Hawaii. Apogon transited the Panama Canal on 25 September and reported for duty on that date to the Commander in Chief, Pacific Fleet. She reached Pearl Harbor on 11 October and began three weeks of training.

After loading fuel and provisions, Apogon got underway on 3 November for her first war patrol. Her patrol area comprised the waters within a 60-mile (110 km) radius of Moen Island and those along the shipping lanes between Truk and Kwajalein. The submarine was acting in support of Operation Galvanic, the seizure of the Gilbert Islands.

After a brief stop at Johnston Island on 5 November to top off her fuel tanks, Apogon continued on to her assigned area. During this patrol, she sighted four contacts deemed worthy of torpedo expenditure and actually attacked three. The only major damage she inflicted occurred on 4 December, when the submarine sank Daido Maru, a former gunboat. On 18 December, she ended her patrol and moored at Midway Atoll.

Following a refit there, Apogon proceeded to Pearl Harbor on 26 December for further repairs and training. She left Hawaii on 15 January 1944 for her second patrol, this time in waters surrounding the Mariana Islands. On 1 February, Apogon made the only attack of the patrol. She sighted a six-ship convoy and, soon thereafter, opened fire. The crew heard an explosion and saw their torpedoed target burst into flames. Ten minutes later, the lookout saw about 50 feet of the Japanese ship's stern sticking out of the water, and this soon disappeared. Apogon then attacked another Japanese auxiliary. Although Apogon claimed to have sunk both ships, she was not officially credited with having destroyed either. Apogon ended her patrol after 50 days and returned to Pearl Harbor on 9 March.

Apogon moored beside Bushnell on 10 March to commence refit. The submarine was drydocked at the Pearl Harbor Navy Yard from 15 to 19 March for the installation of two new propellers. After additional training exercises, she got underway on 2 April.

She paused at Johnston Island on 4 April to refuel, and later that day resumed her voyage toward waters south of the Japanese home islands. However, when a crewman was preparing to clean a 20 millimeter machine gun the next day, a live cartridge accidentally left in the chamber discharged and ricocheted into the man's leg. Apogon immediately returned to Johnston Island to transfer the wounded man to the dispensary. The submarine again got underway on 6 April and conducted her entire patrol without encountering any enemy shipping. She finally arrived at Majuro on 22 May.

Refitting began on 23 May, and the submarine got underway on 8 June for trials. Apogon began her fourth patrol, which was in the area between Formosa and the Philippines, in company with Guardfish, Thresher, and Piranha.

On 12 July, Apogon and her wolf pack consorts spotted a nine-ship Japanese convoy sailing with approximately six escorts. The submarines immediately began preparing an attack. The leading Japanese ship of the center column of the formation apparently sighted the wake of Apogon's periscope and turned back to ram the submarine. As Apogon was turning to port to bring her stern tubes to bear, she was struck on the starboard side by the freighter. About eight feet of the main periscope and periscope shears were torn off, and the radar masts were bent and put out of commission. As a result, Apogon prematurely ended her patrol to return for repairs. She arrived at Midway on 22 July, where crews installed additional bracing on the periscope shears before the submarine proceeded on to Pearl Harbor.

Having reached Pearl Harbor on 26 July, Apogon was dry-docked. Both tail shafts were replaced and realigned, and the periscope, periscope shears, and the radar masts were replaced. The three main engines were also overhauled. On 12 September, Apogon was underway on yet another wartime patrol. She headed for the Kuril Islands area. The submarine then sunk a Japanese patrol craft on 23 September the 400 ton Choyo Maru No.6. Four days later, she sank Hachirogata Maru. Following this sinking, she rescued two Japanese survivors. The next month proved fruitless, and Apogon arrived at Midway on 28 October, ending her fifth patrol.

After a month of refit, Apogon commenced her sixth patrol on 20 November, again sailing for the Kuril Islands. The only action of this patrol was an attack on a tanker, which the submarine hit and damaged with a torpedo 19 December 1944. On 5 January 1945, Apogon arrived in Pearl Harbor for a brief stay before getting underway on 7 January for the Mare Island Naval Shipyard, Vallejo, California to undergo a major overhaul.

Apogon returned to action on 28 May. Her patrol station was the Kuril Islands-Sea of Okhotsk area. She attacked a convoy of four Japanese ships and escort vessels on 18 June and sank one 2,614-ton transport, Hakuai Maru(ja:博愛丸, that inspired the novel Kani Kōsen) and sank the guard boat Kusonoki Maru no.2. On 2 July, Apogon severely damaged two small auxiliary submarine chasers Cha 58 and Cha 65. The patrol ended on 14 July at Midway.

Apogon began her eighth and final patrol on 7 August. She was assigned to the Marcus Island area. She made no attacks during this patrol because the Japanese capitulated on 15 August. Apogon returned to Pearl Harbor on 2 September and then continued on to San Diego, where she arrived on 11 September. Apogon was placed in reserve and decommissioned there on 1 October.

=== Post-War ===
==== Operation Crossroads ====
A 21-kiloton underwater nuclear weapons effects test, known as Operation Crossroads (Event Baker), conducted at Bikini Atoll (1946).

In January 1946, the submarine sailed for Pearl Harbor where she was to undergo preliminary work and tests in preparation to be used as a target in atomic bomb testing. Following completion of this refitting, Apogon arrived at Bikini Atoll on 31 May. She was sunk at Bikini during atomic bomb test "Baker" on 25 July 1946. Her name was struck from the Naval Vessel Register on 25 February 1947.

== Awards ==
Apogon received six battle stars for her World War II service.
