= USS Piranha =

Submarine of the United States

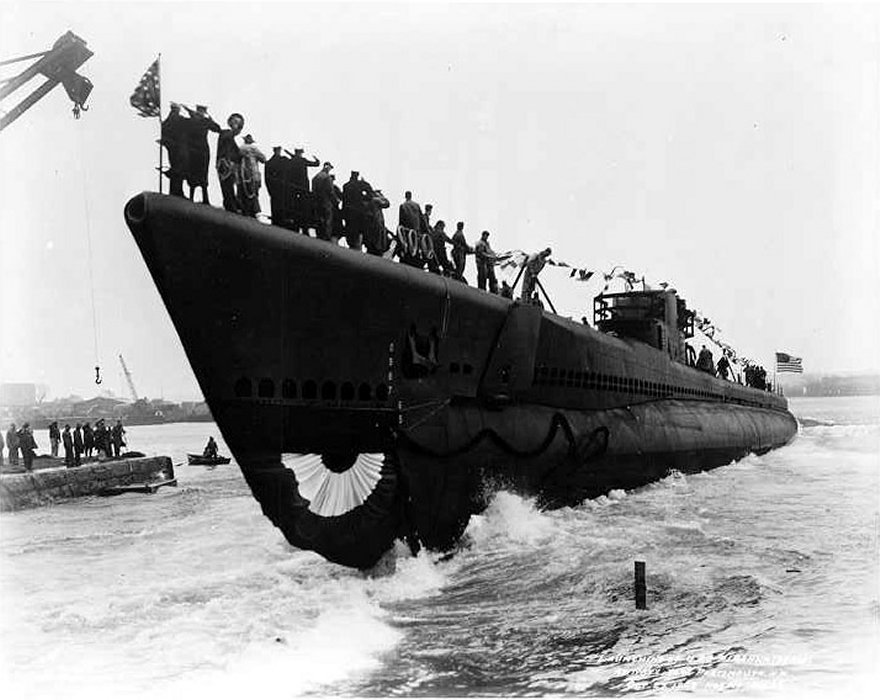
- Piranha (SS-328) at her launching, Portsmouth Navy Yard, 10 October 1943.

History

United States
- Builder: Portsmouth Naval Shipyard, Kittery, Maine
- Laid down: 21 June 1943
- Launched: 27 October 1943
- Commissioned: 5 February 1944
- Decommissioned: 31 May 1946
- Stricken: 1 March 1967
- Fate: Sold for scrap, 11 August 1970

General characteristics
- Class & type: Balao class diesel-electric submarine
- Displacement: 1,526 tons (1,550 t) surfaced; 2,391 tons (2,429 t) submerged
- Length: 311 ft 6 in (94.95 m)
- Beam: 27 ft 3 in (8.31 m)
- Draft: 16 ft 10 in (5.13 m) maximum
- Propulsion: 4 × Fairbanks-Morse Model 38D8-⅛ 10-cylinder opposed piston diesel engines driving electrical generators; 2 × 126-cell Sargo batteries; 4 × high-speed Elliott electric motors with reduction gears; two propellers; 5,400 shp (4.0 MW) surfaced; 2,740 shp (2.0 MW) submerged
- Speed: 20.25 knots (38 km/h) surfaced; 8.75 knots (16 km/h) submerged
- Range: 11,000 nautical miles (20,000 km) surfaced at 10 knots (19 km/h)
- Endurance: 48 hours at 2 knots (3.7 km/h) submerged; 75 days on patrol
- Test depth: 400 ft (120 m)
- Complement: 10 officers, 70–71 enlisted
- Armament: 10 × 21-inch (533 mm) torpedo tubes; 6 forward, 4 aft; 24 torpedoes; 1 × 5-inch (127 mm) / 25 caliber deck gun; Bofors 40 mm and Oerlikon 20 mm cannon

USS Piranha (SS-389/AGSS-389), a Balao-class submarine, was the only ship of the United States Navy to be named for the piranha. Piranha conducted six war patrols during World War II, receiving five battle stars. She was scrapped in 1970.

== Construction and commissioning ==
Piranha was laid down 21 June 1943 by Portsmouth Navy Yard in Kittery, Maine; launched 27 October 1943; sponsored by Mrs. William S. Farber; and commissioned 5 February 1944.

== World War II ==
After East Coast training, Piranha departed Key West 3 April 1944 for the Panama Canal and her base, Pearl Harbor, arriving 18 May for final training. With Guardfish (SS-217), Thresher (SS-200), and Apogon (SS-308), she made her first war patrol between 14 June and 8 August. The coordinated attack group prowled waters west and north of Luzon, striking fiercely and with notable success at Japanese convoys. Piranha’s victims were Nichiran Maru, sunk 12 July, and Seattle Maru, sunk four days later. Several times attacked by enemy aircraft and dodging surface patrol craft, Piranha returned safely to Majuro.

For the first part of her second patrol, Piranha joined 9 other submarines in offensive reconnaissance covering the Third Fleet during the assault on Peleliu, patrolling 30 August to 25 September. When Peleliu, deemed essential for the liberation of the Philippines, had been seized, Piranha’s group dissolved and she searched for targets westward along the 20th parallel, engaging an enemy patrol craft 9 October. She endured a heavy depth charge attack, but outsmarted the patrol vessel, returning to Pearl Harbor 23 October.

During her third war patrol, again with an attack group, besides seeking worthwhile targets in the East China Sea 19 November to 13 January 1945, Piranha served as lifeguard during B-29 strikes on Kyūshū. She scored two hits on a merchantman 8 January {No.2 Shinto Maru}, only to be driven off by an escort without being able to regain attack position.

Refitted at Guam, Piranha sailed 11 February for her fourth war patrol, a classic exhibition of submarine versatility. With her attack group she sought targets on the convoy lanes from Luzon to Formosa and Hong Kong. She spent 17 days on lifeguard during airstrikes on Formosa, on 27 February sinking a junk presumably serving as aircraft spotter.

Piranha was foiled by a large fleet of fishing junks from making a rapid approach on a convoy reported leaving Hong Kong 5 March. Daringly resorting to an ancient ruse of naval warfare, she improvised an Imperial Japanese Navy naval ensign and ran it up. The deception was successful, and she threaded her way through the fishermen at flank speed, but was unable to locate the convoy.

On 9 March 1945, an unidentified plane attacked Piranha, dropping a flare and two bombs. On 11 March, a U.S. Navy PBM Mariner flying boat attacked her, dropping four bombs as she took evasive action and headed for deeper water on the surface. On 20 March, an Allied aircraft which Piranha′s crew thought was most likely a United States Army Air Forces B-24 Liberator bomber bombed Piranha as she maneuvered evasively and submerged. Piranha sustained no damage in any of the attacks.

Piranha bombarded Pratas Island on 26 March 1945 with 100 5-inch (127 mm) shells. Three times during this patrol, which concluded with 10 days off Wake Island, the submarine successfully maneuvered to avoid hits from attacking aircraft. She returned to Midway to refit 21 April – 17 May, then sailed for patrol, lifeguard, and bombardment at Marcus Island 22 May – 31 May. Here she was attacked several times by shore batteries. After refueling at Saipan, Piranha sailed to complete this patrol off Honshū.

With the decimated Japanese merchant marine hugging its own coast, Piranha was frequently frustrated by shallow water and omnipresent escorts in her attacks. Hair-raising encounters with submarine chasers and aircraft were rendered infinitely more dangerous by being fought so close offshore, where she had little water depth for maneuver. Her persistence and courage paid off; she heavily damaged a freighter 14 June, sank a coastal tanker and destroyed a trawler laden with oil drums by gunfire 17 June. On 22 June 1945, she fired two torpedoes at the escort ship CD-196 at 39°31′N 142°39′E blowing off her rudder and killing two crewman. Two more trawlers fell to her gun 23 June. Though slightly damaged when their escort retaliated with depth charges, Piranha returned safely to Pearl Harbor 10 July.

== End of war and fate ==
Her sixth and last war patrol lasted 14 hours; she had sailed from Pearl Harbor 14 August and was ordered back when hostilities ended the next day. Returning to San Francisco 11 September, Piranha decommissioned at Mare Island Naval Shipyard 31 May 1946. There she lay in reserve, redesignated AGSS-389 on 6 November 1962, until stricken from the Naval Register 1 March 1967 and sold for scrap.

== Honors and awards ==
Piranha received 5 battle stars for World War II service.
