= List of ships of the Imperial Japanese Navy =

The following is the list of ships of the Imperial Japanese Navy for the duration of its existence, 1868–1945. This list also includes ships before the official founding of the Navy and some auxiliary ships used by the Army. For a list of ships of its successor, the Japan Maritime Self-Defense Force, see List of active Japan Maritime Self-Defense Force ships and List of combatant ship classes of the Japan Maritime Self-Defense Force.

== Early warships ==
- Atakebune, 16th century coastal oar propelled warships.
- Red seal ships – Around 350 armed sailships, commissioned by the Bakufu in the early 17th century, for Asian and South-East Asian trade.
- San Buena Ventura (1607) – Built by William Adams for Tokugawa Ieyasu. Crossed the Pacific in 1610.
- San Juan Bautista (1614) – One of Japan's first Western-style sail warships, transported the embassy of Hasekura Tsunenaga to America in 1614.

== Early modern warships ==
=== Edo period ===
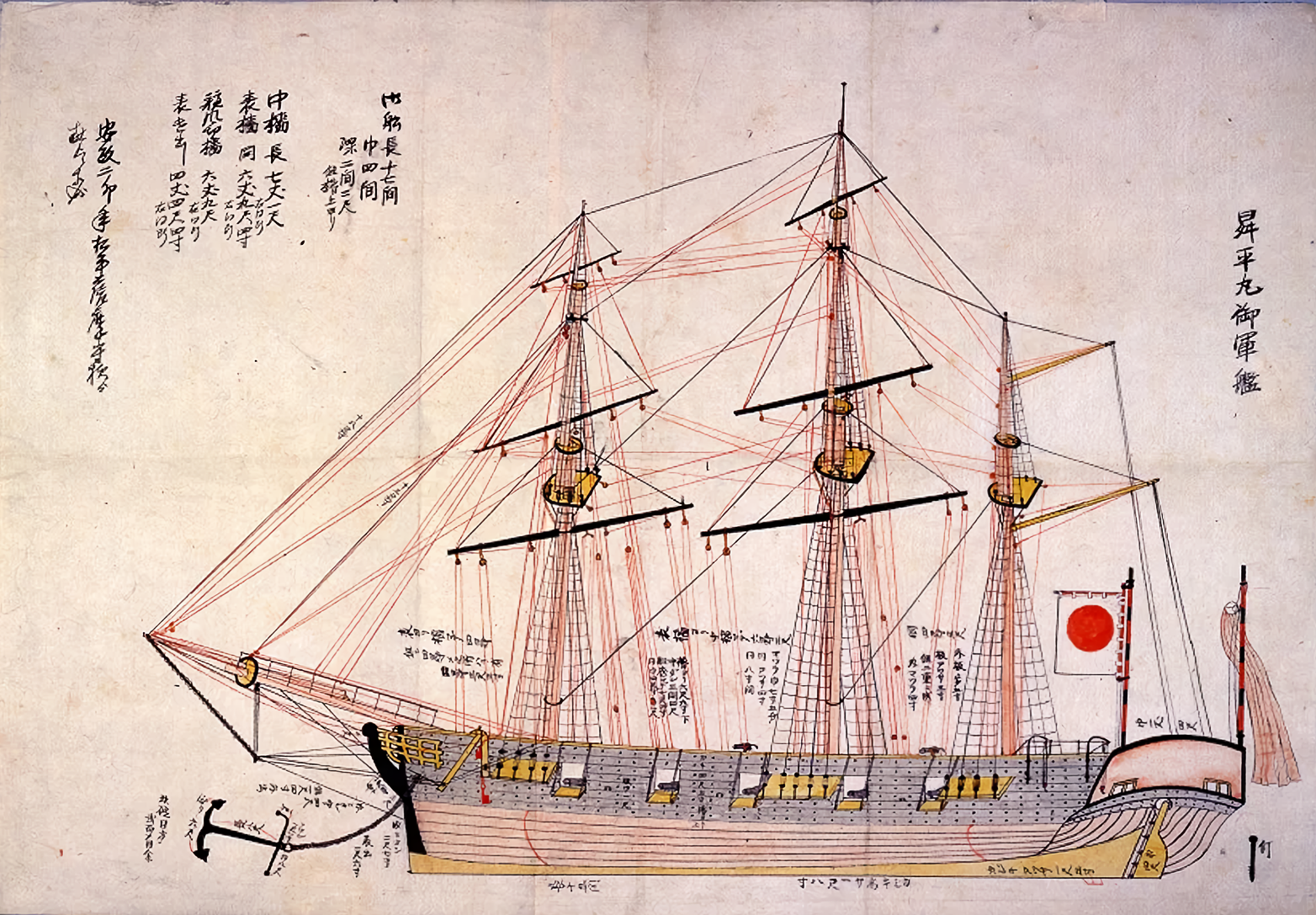
Illustration of Shohei Maru

This section lists warships belonging to the Tokugawa shogunate and to the various domains of Japan before the Meiji Restoration and the Boshin War. Several of the vessels that survived the war would go on to serve in the fledgling Imperial Japanese Navy.

==== Western-style sail warships ====
- Shohei Maru (1854), Japan's first post-seclusion Western-style sail warship.
- Asahi Maru (1854)
- Hōō Maru (1854)
- Kaifū Maru (1862) (ja:快風丸_(日本海軍))
- Risshō Maru (1867) (ja:立象丸)

==== Steam warships ====
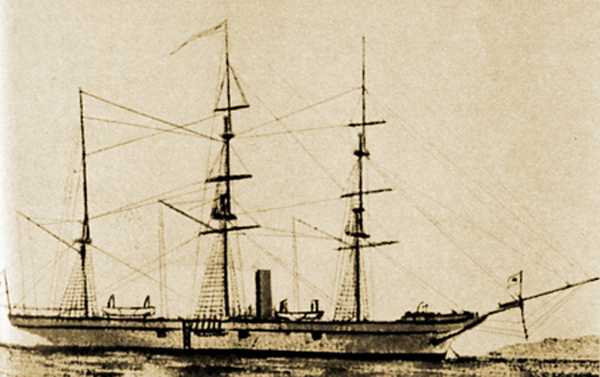
Kanrin Maru in 1855

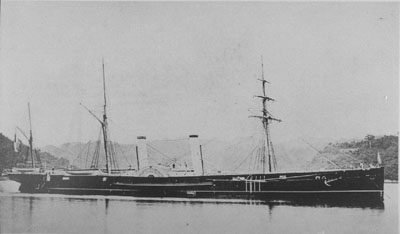
Kasuga circa 1878

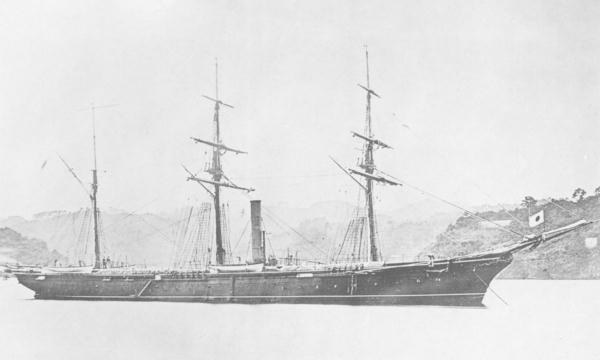
Seiki circa 1878

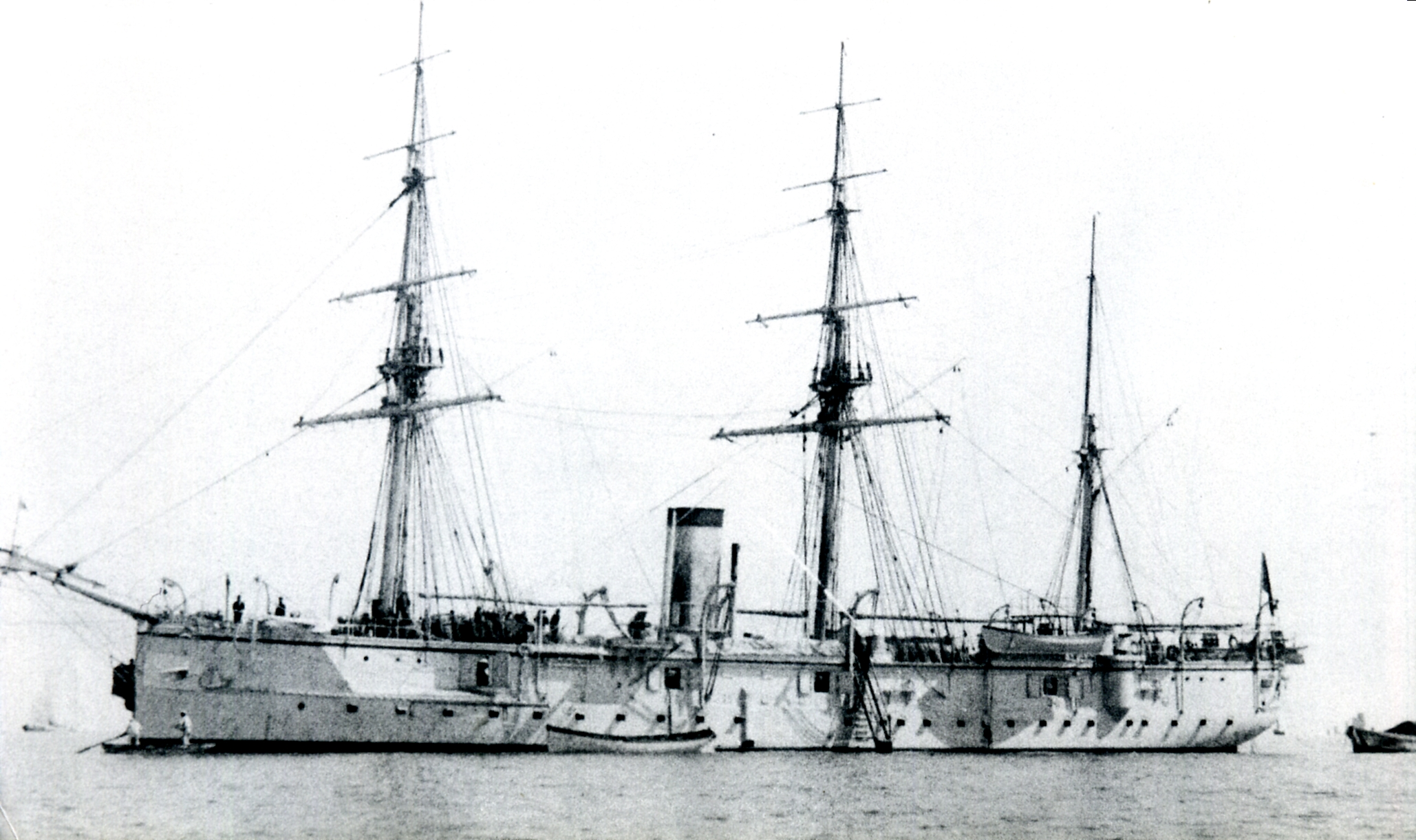
Katsuragi circa 1897

- Kankō Maru (1855), Japan's first steam warship.
- Bali class (1856-1857), Japan's first screw-driven steam warships.
  - Kanrin Maru, Chōyō Maru, Denryū Maru (ja:電流丸)
- Banryū Maru (1858)
- Chiyodagata (1863), Japan's first domestically built steam warship.
- Shōkaku Maru (1863) (ja:翔鶴丸)
- Fujiyama (1864)
- Kenkō (1864)
- Hiryū Maru (1865) (ja:飛龍丸)
- Kaiten (1865)
- Kaiyō Maru (1865)
- Yōshun (1865)
- Chōgei Maru (1866)
- Kayō Maru (1866) (ja:華陽丸)
- Kōsoku Maru (1866) (ja:行速丸)
- Teibō No.1 (1866) (ja:第一丁卯)
- Teibō No.2 (1866)
- Kasuga (1867)
- Mōshun (1867)
- Pawtuxet class (1867-1868)
  - Takao, Kawachi, Musashi
- Ennen Maru (1868) (ja:延年丸)
- Hōshō (1868)
- Izumi Maru (1868) (ja:和泉丸)
- Nisshin (1868)
- Settsu (1868) (ja:摂津艦)
- Kaiun Maru (ja:開運丸)
- Kōkyōsen (ja:虹橋船)
- Mikaho
- Shinsoku

=== Meiji era ===
- Ryūjō (1869)
- Tsukuba (1870)
- Un'yō (1870)
- Asama (1874) (ja:浅間_(コルベット))
- Seiki (1875)
- Jingei (1876)
- Amagi (1877)
- Kongō class (1877)
  - Kongō, Hiei
- Banjō (1878)
- Kaimon (1882)
- Tenryū (1883)
- Katsuragi class (1885-1886)
  - Katsuragi, Yamato, Musashi
- Chinese gunboat captured during the First Sino-Japanese War (1894)
  - Sōkō (ex-Tsao-kiang)

== Battleships ==
=== Pre-dreadnoughts ===
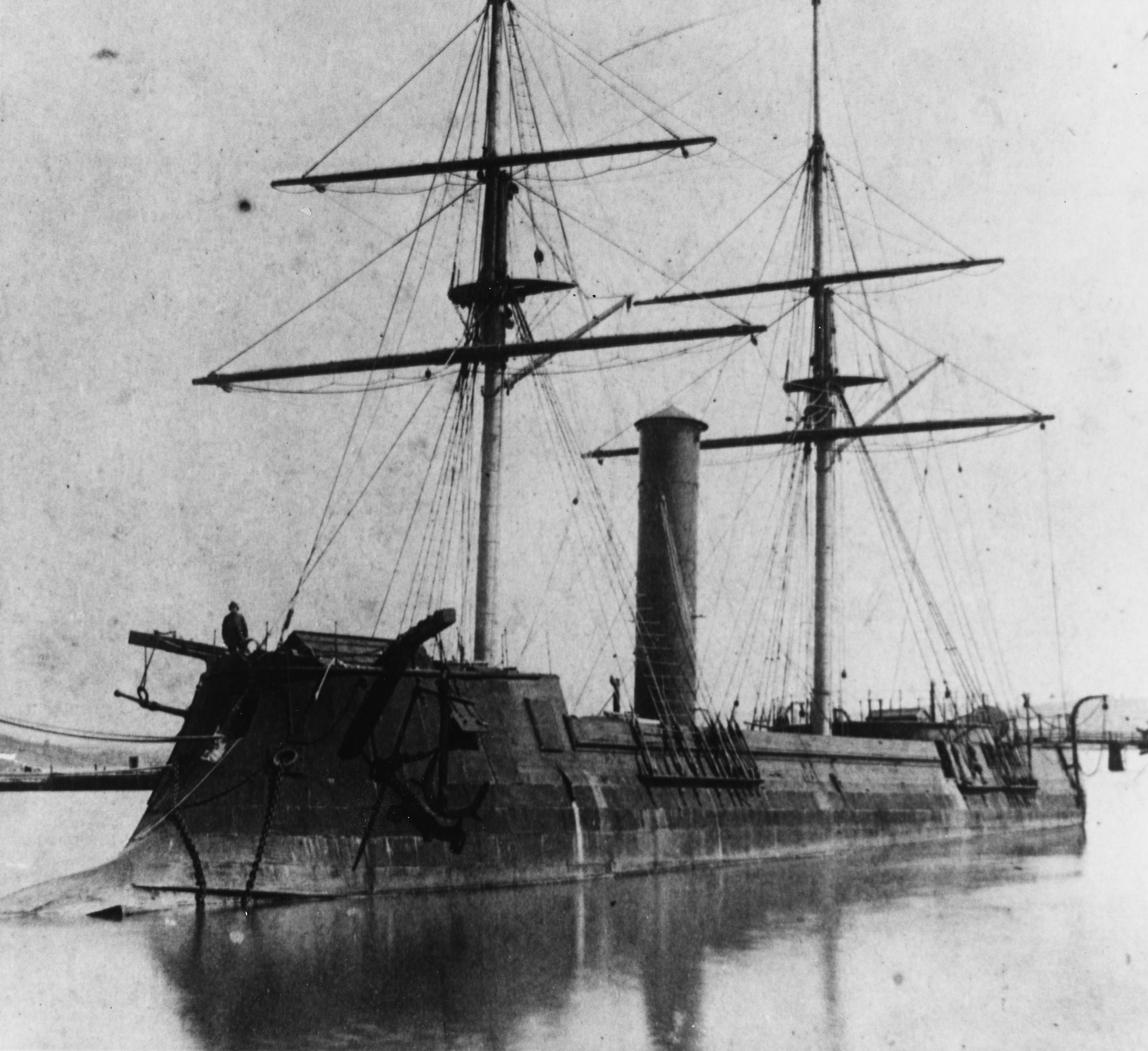
Kotetsu

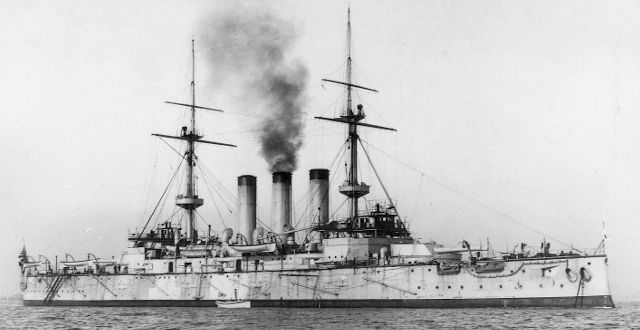
Shikishima

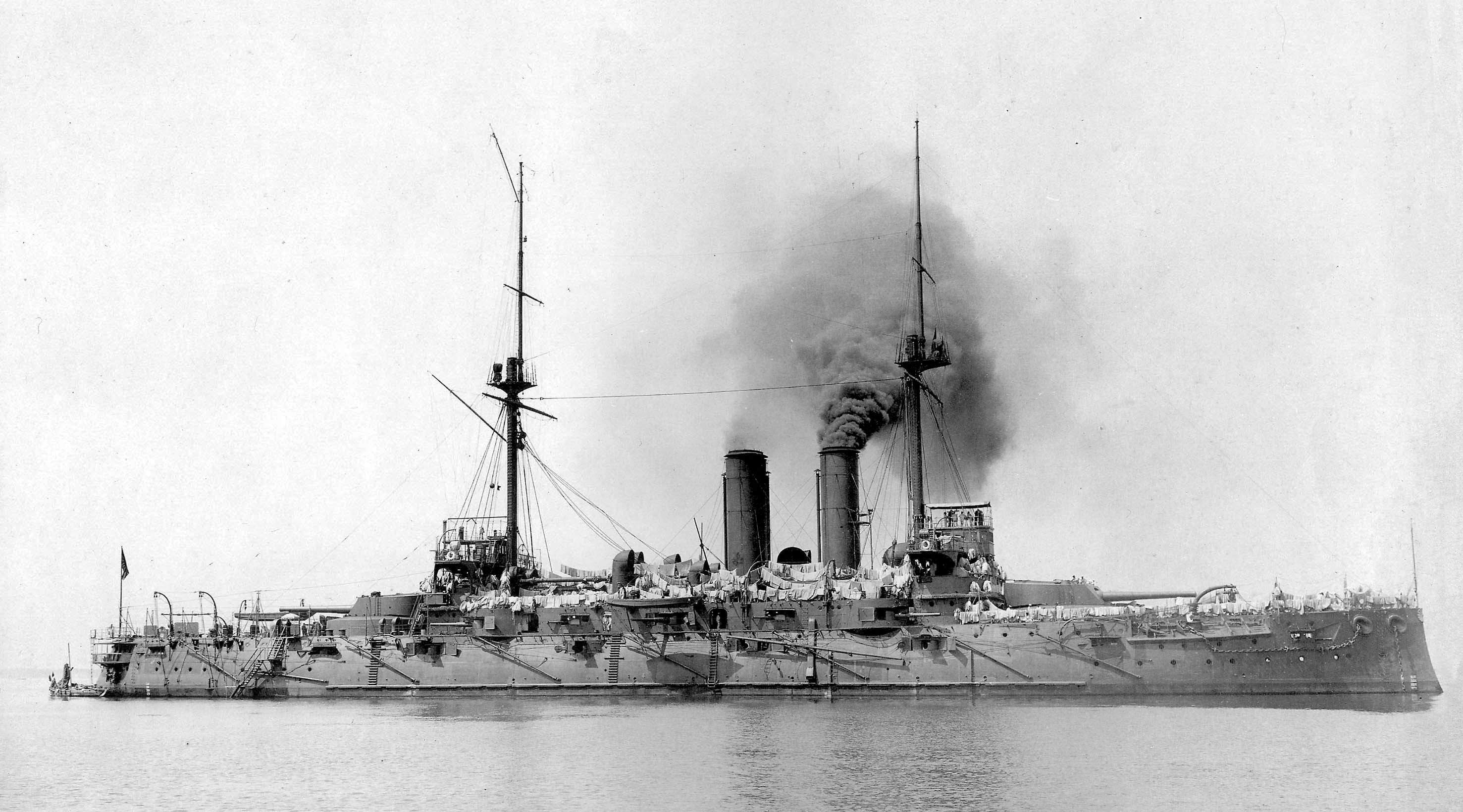
Asahi

Ship or class	Displacement	Main battery	Secondary battery	Torpedo tubes	Complement	Speed	Ships in class			
Ship or class	Displacement	Main battery	Secondary battery	Torpedo tubes	Complement	Speed	Ship	Keel laid	Commissioned	Fate
Kōtetsu, ex-CSS Stonewall; renamed Azuma, Dec 1871	1,390 t	1× 10 in (250 mm)	2x 6.4 in (160 mm)		135	10.5 kn (19.4 km/h; 12.1 mph)		1863	Feb 1869	Sold for scrap, Dec 1889
Fusō	3,717 t	4x 9.4 in (240 mm)	2x 6.7 in (170 mm)		295	13 kn (24 km/h; 15 mph)		Jul 1875	Jan 1878	Sold for scrap, 1909
Chin'en (Prize of First Sino-Japanese War)	7,220 t	4× 12 in (300 mm)	2x 155 mm (6.1 in)	3x 14 in (360 mm)	350	15.4 kn (28.5 km/h; 17.7 mph)		Mar 1882	Mar 1895	Scrapped, 1912
Fuji class	12,230 t	4× 12 in (300 mm)	10x 6 in (150 mm)	5x 18 in (460 mm)	650	18.25 kn (33.80 km/h; 21.00 mph)	Fuji	Aug 1894	Aug 1897	Scrapped, 1948
Fuji class	12,230 t	4× 12 in (300 mm)	10x 6 in (150 mm)	5x 18 in (460 mm)	650	18.25 kn (33.80 km/h; 21.00 mph)	Yashima	Dec 1894	Sep 1897	Naval mines, May 1904
Shikishima class	14,850 t	4× 12 in (300 mm)	14x 6 in (150 mm)	4x 18 in (460 mm)	741	18 kn (33 km/h; 21 mph)	Shikishima	Mar 1897	Jan 1900	Scrapped, 1948
Shikishima class	14,850 t	4× 12 in (300 mm)	14x 6 in (150 mm)	4x 18 in (460 mm)	741	18 kn (33 km/h; 21 mph)	Hatsuse	Jan 1898	Jan 1901	Naval mine, May 1904
Asahi	15,200 t	4× 12 in (300 mm)	14x 6 in (150 mm)	4x 18 in (460 mm)	773	18 kn (33 km/h; 21 mph)		Aug 1898	Apr 1900	sunk by USS Salmon (SS-182) May 1942
Mikasa	15,140 t	4× 12 in (300 mm)	14x 6 in (150 mm)	4x 18 in (460 mm)	836	18 kn (33 km/h; 21 mph)		Jan 1899	Mar 1902	Preserved as museum ship

=== Prizes of the Russo-Japanese War ===
==== Battleships ====
Ship	Displacement	Main battery	Secondary battery	Torpedo tubes	Comple- ment	Speed	Keel Laid	Commissioned into IJN	Fate
Iki (ex-Russian Imperator Nikolai I)	9,594 t	2× 12 in (300 mm)	6x 6 in (150 mm)	6x 18 in (460 mm)	616	14 kn (26 km/h; 16 mph)	Aug 1886	Jun 1905	Target, Oct 1915
Tango (ex-Russian Poltava)	11,500 t	4× 12 in (300 mm)	4x 9 in (230 mm)	2x 18 in (460 mm); 4x 15 in (380 mm)	631	16 kn (30 km/h; 18 mph)	May 1892	Aug 1905	Returned to Russia, 1916
Sagami (ex-Russian Peresvet)	13,810 t	4× 10 in (250 mm)	10x 6 in (150 mm)	2x 18 in (460 mm)	771	18 kn (33 km/h; 21 mph)	Nov 1895	Jul 1908	Sold back to Russia, Mar 1916
Suwo (ex-Russian Pobeda)	13,320 t	4× 10 in (250 mm)	10x 6 in (150 mm)	2x 18 in (460 mm)	771	18 kn (33 km/h; 21 mph)	Feb 1899	Oct 1908	Probably scrapped, 1922-1923
Hizen (ex-Russian Retvizan)	12,780 t	4× 12 in (300 mm)	12x 6 in (150 mm)	6x 15 in (380 mm)	750	18 kn (33 km/h; 21 mph)	Jul 1899	Jan 1905	Sunk as target, Jul 1924
Iwami (ex-Russian Oryol)	14,151 t	4× 12 in (300 mm)	12x 6 in (150 mm)	4x 15 in (380 mm)	854	18 kn (33 km/h; 21 mph)	Jun 1900	Jun 1907	Sunk as target, Jul 1924

==== Coastal defense ships ====
Ship	Displacement	Main battery	Secondary battery	Torpedo tubes	Comple- ment	Speed	Keel laid	Commissioned into IJN	Fate
Mishima (ex-Russian Admiral Seniavin)	4,165 t	4× 10 in (250 mm)	6x 6 in (150 mm)	removed	406	16 kn (30 km/h; 18 mph)	Aug 1892	Jun 1905	Sunk as target, May 1936
Okinoshima (ex-Russian General Admiral Graf Apraksin)	4,165 t	3× 10 in (250 mm)	6x 6 in (150 mm)	removed	406	15 kn (28 km/h; 17 mph)	Oct 1894	Jun 1905	Scrapped, 1939

=== Transitional Dreadnoughts ===
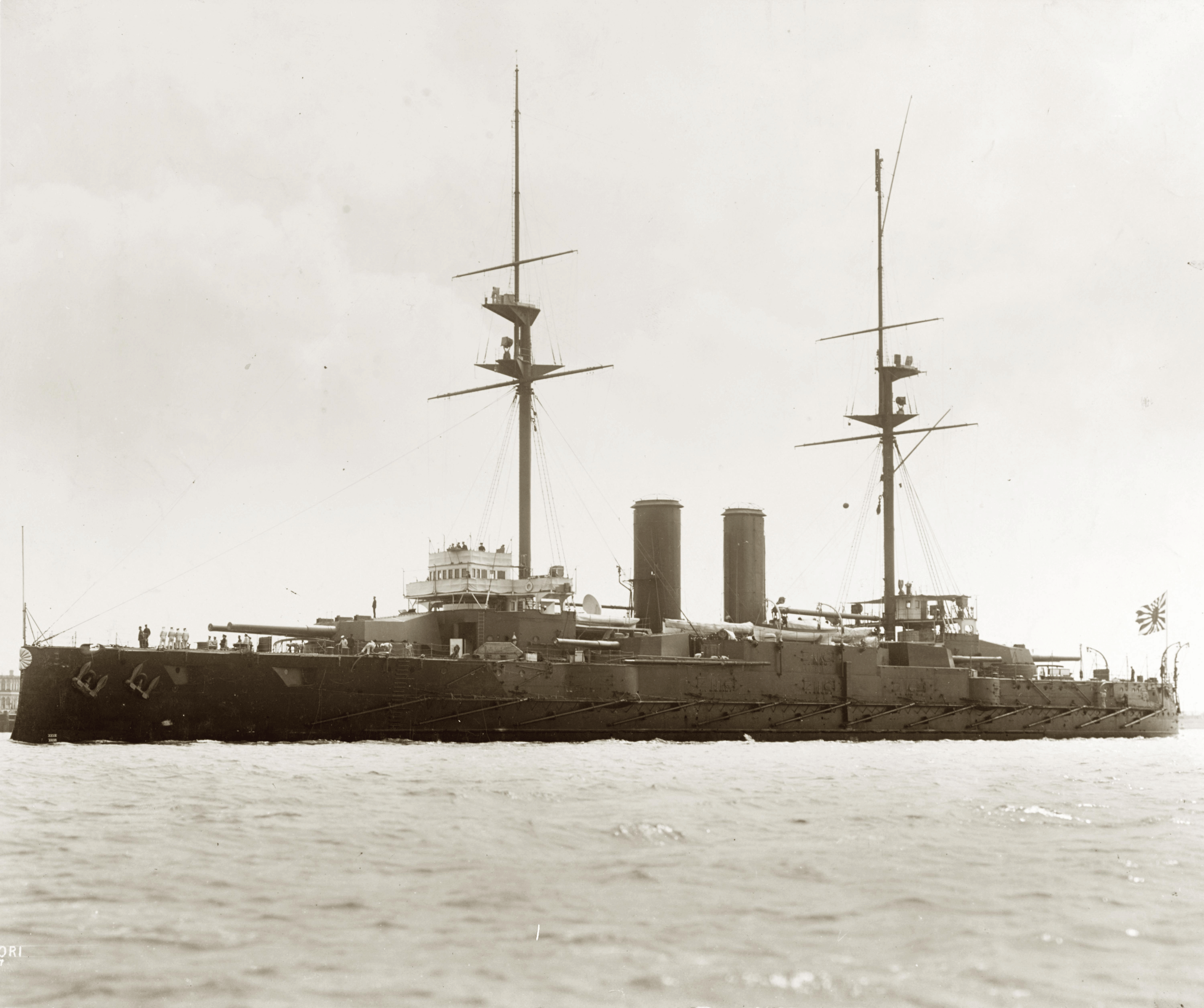
Katori

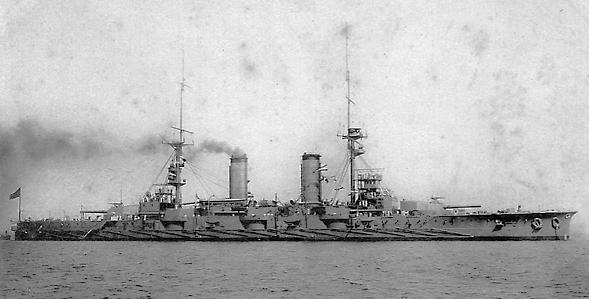
Satsuma

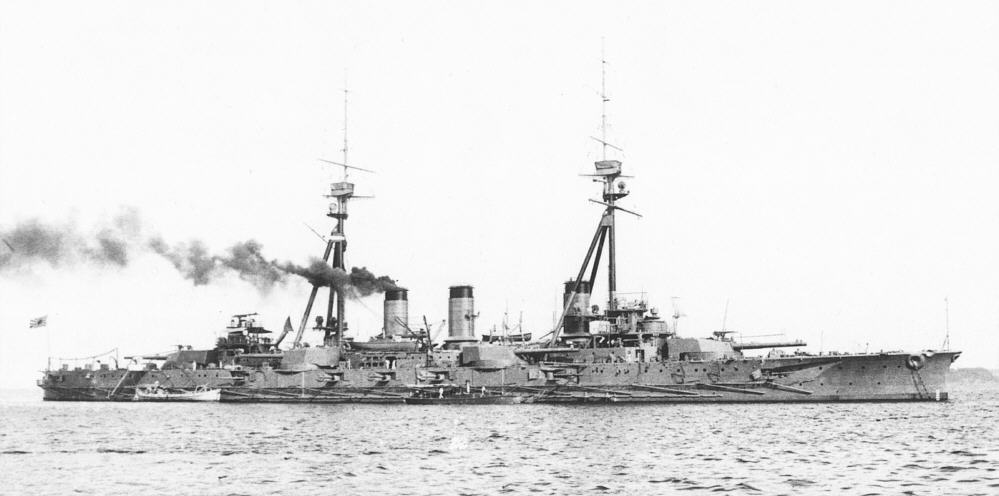
Settsu

Class	Displacement	Main Battery	Secondary Battery	Torpedo Tubes	Comple- ment	Speed	Ships in class			
Class	Displacement	Main Battery	Secondary Battery	Torpedo Tubes	Comple- ment	Speed	Ship	Keel Laid	Commis- sioned	Fate
Katori class	15,950 t	4× 12 in (300 mm); 4× 10 in (250 mm)	12x 6 in (150 mm)	5x 18 in (460 mm)	864	18 kn (33 km/h; 21 mph)	Katori	Apr 1904	May 1906	Scrapped, 1925
Katori class	15,950 t	4× 12 in (300 mm); 4× 10 in (250 mm)	12x 6 in (150 mm)	5x 18 in (460 mm)	864	18 kn (33 km/h; 21 mph)	Kashima	Feb 1904	May 1906	Scrapped, 1924
Satsuma class	19,372 t	4× 12 in (300 mm); 12× 10 in (250 mm)	8x 6 in (150 mm)	5x 18 in (460 mm)	940	20 kn (37 km/h; 23 mph)	Satsuma	May 1905	Mar 1910	Sunk as target, 1924
Satsuma class	19,372 t	4× 12 in (300 mm); 12× 10 in (250 mm)	8x 6 in (150 mm)	5x 18 in (460 mm)	940	20 kn (37 km/h; 23 mph)	Aki	Mar 1906	Mar 191	Sunk as target, 1924
Kawachi class	20,823 t	12× 12 in (300 mm)	10× 6 in (150 mm)	5x 18 in (460 mm)	1,100	21 kn (39 km/h; 24 mph)	Kawachi	Apr 1909	Mar 1912	Internal explosion, 1918
Kawachi class	20,823 t	12× 12 in (300 mm)	10× 6 in (150 mm)	5x 18 in (460 mm)	1,100	21 kn (39 km/h; 24 mph)	Settsu	Jan 1909	Jul 1912	Scrapped, 1947

=== Battleship prizes of World War I ===
Source	Displacement	Main Battery	Secondary Battery	Torpedo Tubes	Comple- ment	Speed	Keel Laid	Ceded to Japan	Fate
ex-German Nassau	18,873 t	12x 11 in (280 mm)	12× 6 in (150 mm)	6x 17.7 in (450 mm)	1,008	20 kn (37 km/h; 23 mph)	Jul 1907	Apr 1920	Scrapped, 1920
ex-German Oldenburg	22,808 t	12× 12 in (300 mm)	14x 155 mm (6.1 in)	6x 21 in (530 mm)	1,069	20.8 kn (38.5 km/h; 23.9 mph)	Mar 1909	Apr 1920	Scrapped, 1921

=== Battlecruisers ===
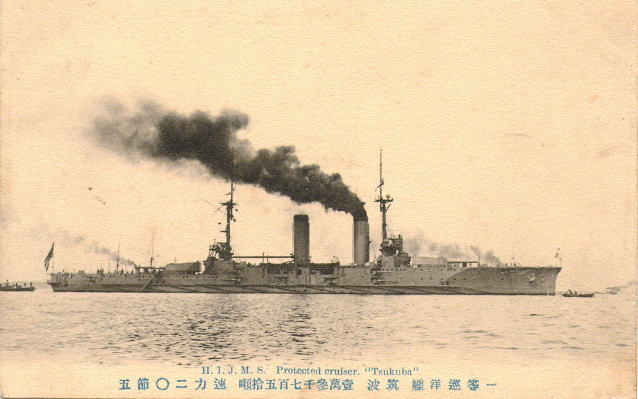
Tsukuba

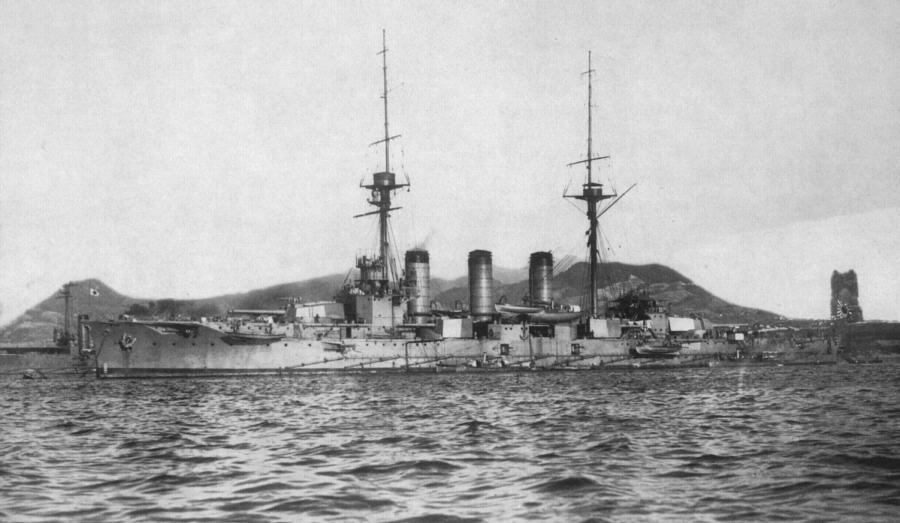
Ibuki

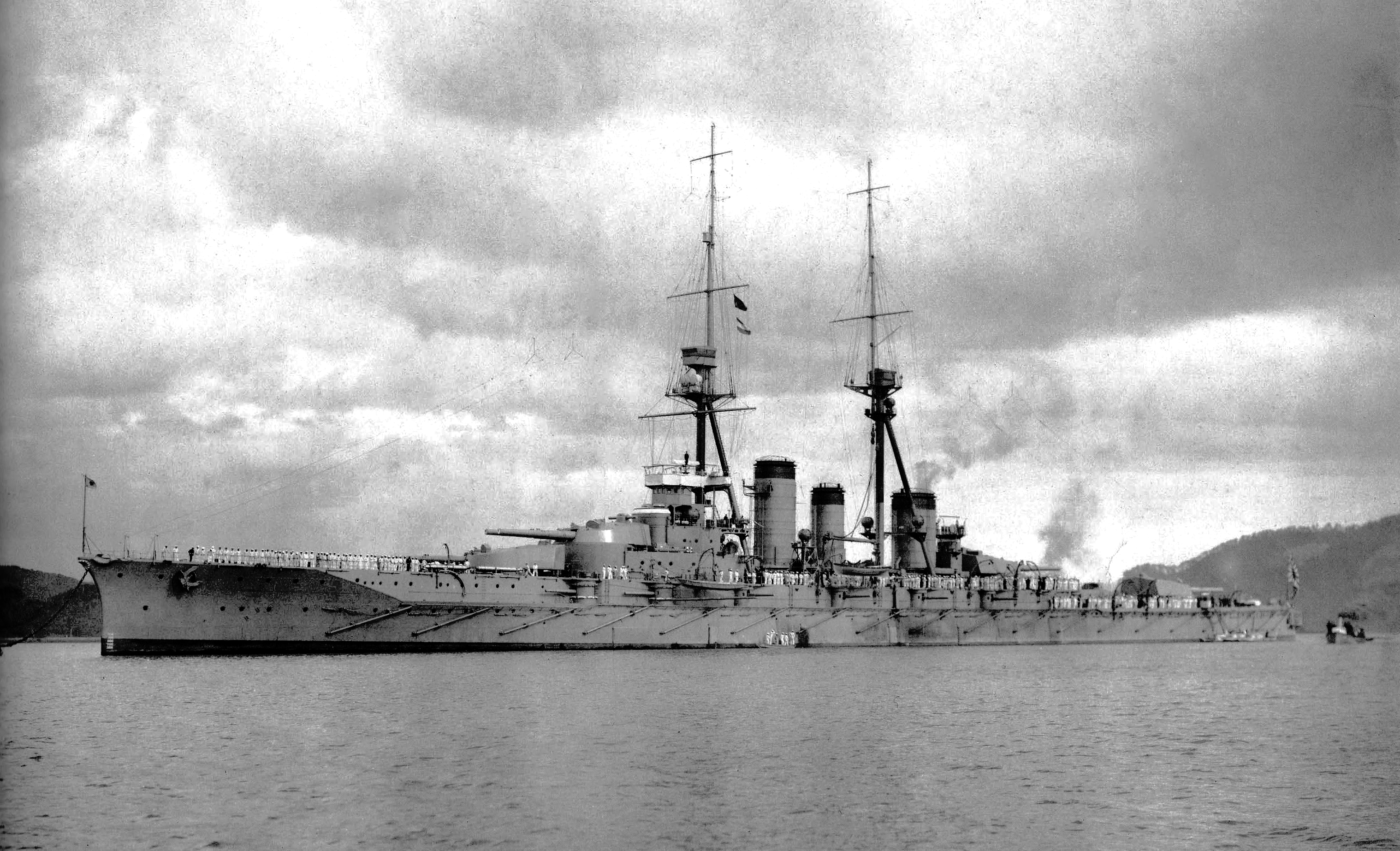
Kirishima

Class	Displace- ment	Main Battery	Secondary Battery	Torpedo Tubes	Comple- ment	Speed	Ships in Class			
Class	Displace- ment	Main Battery	Secondary Battery	Torpedo Tubes	Comple- ment	Speed	Ship	Keel Laid	Commis- sioned	Fate
Tsukuba class	13,750 t	4× 12 in (300 mm)	12× 6 in (150 mm)	3	820	20.5 kn (38.0 km/h; 23.6 mph)	Tsukuba	Jan 1905	Jan 1907	Explosion, Jan 1917
Tsukuba class	13,750 t	4× 12 in (300 mm)	12× 6 in (150 mm)	3	820	20.5 kn (38.0 km/h; 23.6 mph)	Ikoma	Mar 1905	Mar 1908	Scrapped, 1923
Ibuki class	14,636 t	4× 12 in (300 mm)	8x 8 in (200 mm)	3x 17.7 in (450 mm)	817	21.25 kn (39.36 km/h; 24.45 mph)	Ibuki	May 1907	Nov 1907	Scrapped, 1923
Ibuki class	14,636 t	4× 12 in (300 mm)	8x 8 in (200 mm)	3x 17.7 in (450 mm)	817	21.25 kn (39.36 km/h; 24.45 mph)	Kurama	Aug 1905	Feb 1911	Scrapped, 1923
Kongō class	31,720 t exc. Kirishima 31,980	8x 14 in (360 mm)	16× 6 in (150 mm)	8x 21 in (530 mm)	1,437	30.5 kn (56.5 km/h; 35.1 mph)	Kongō	Jan 1911	Aug 1913	Converted to fast battleship, 1935
Kongō class	31,720 t exc. Kirishima 31,980	8x 14 in (360 mm)	16× 6 in (150 mm)	8x 21 in (530 mm)	1,437	30.5 kn (56.5 km/h; 35.1 mph)	Haruna	Mar 1912	Apr 1915	Converted to fast battleship, 1933
Kongō class	31,720 t exc. Kirishima 31,980	8x 14 in (360 mm)	16× 6 in (150 mm)	8x 21 in (530 mm)	1,437	30.5 kn (56.5 km/h; 35.1 mph)	Hiei	Nov 1911	Apr 1915	Converted to training ship, 1937; fast battleship, 1941
Kongō class	31,720 t exc. Kirishima 31,980	8x 14 in (360 mm)	16× 6 in (150 mm)	8x 21 in (530 mm)	1,437	30.5 kn (56.5 km/h; 35.1 mph)	Kirishima	Mar 1912	Apr 1915	Converted to fast battleship, 1941
Amagi class	40,000 t						Amagi			Cancelled, 1922
Amagi class	40,000 t						Akagi	Dec 1920	Mar 1927	Completed as aircraft carrier
Amagi class	40,000 t						Atago			Cancelled, 1922
Amagi class	40,000 t						Takao			Cancelled, 1922
Type B-65	32,000 t	9x 12.2 in (310 mm)	16x 100 mm (3.9 in)			33 kn (61 km/h; 38 mph)	Hull 795	Cancelled, 1942		
Type B-65	32,000 t	9x 12.2 in (310 mm)	16x 100 mm (3.9 in)			33 kn (61 km/h; 38 mph)	Hull 796	Cancelled, 1942		

=== In commission during World War II ===
==== Old battleships ====
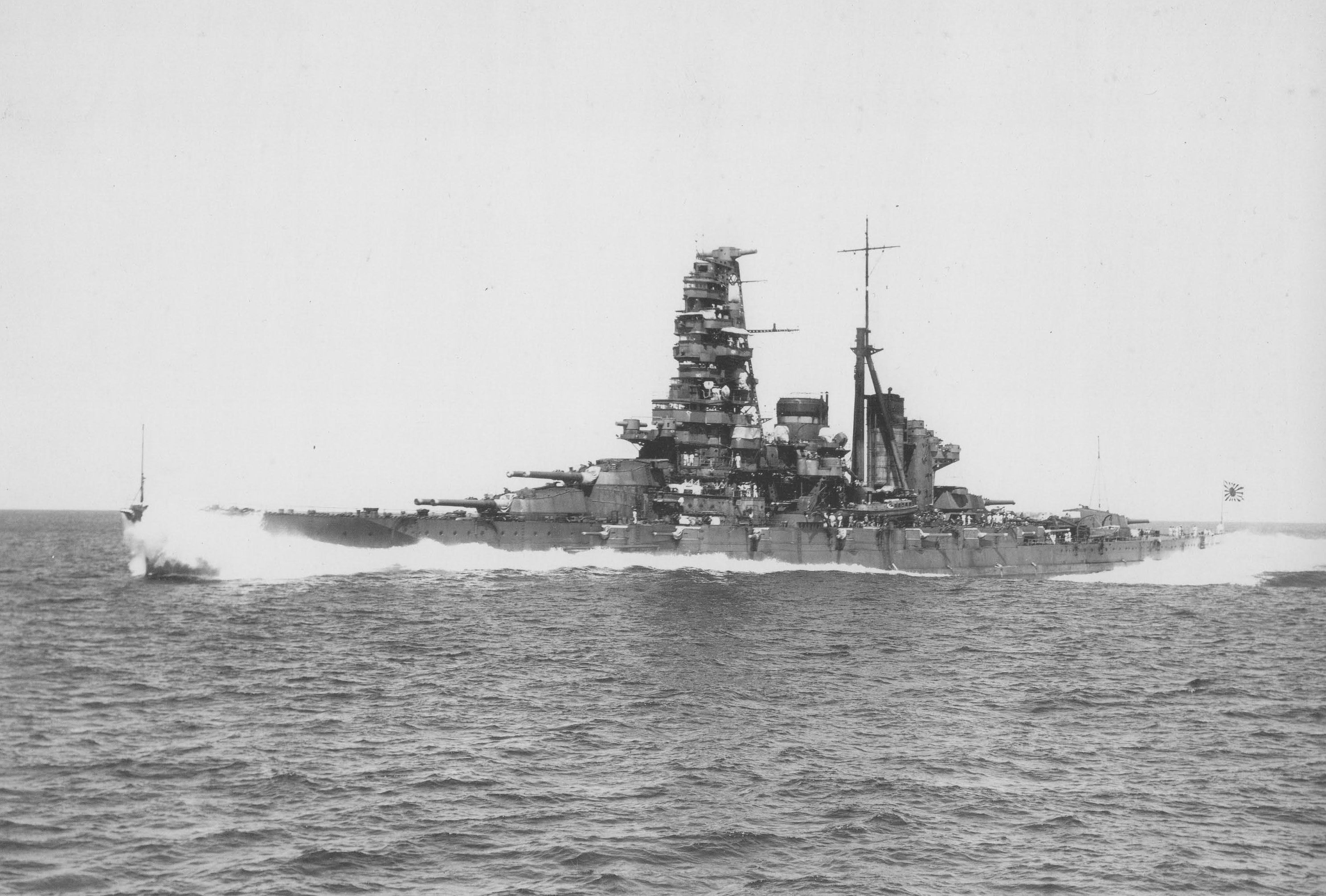
Haruna

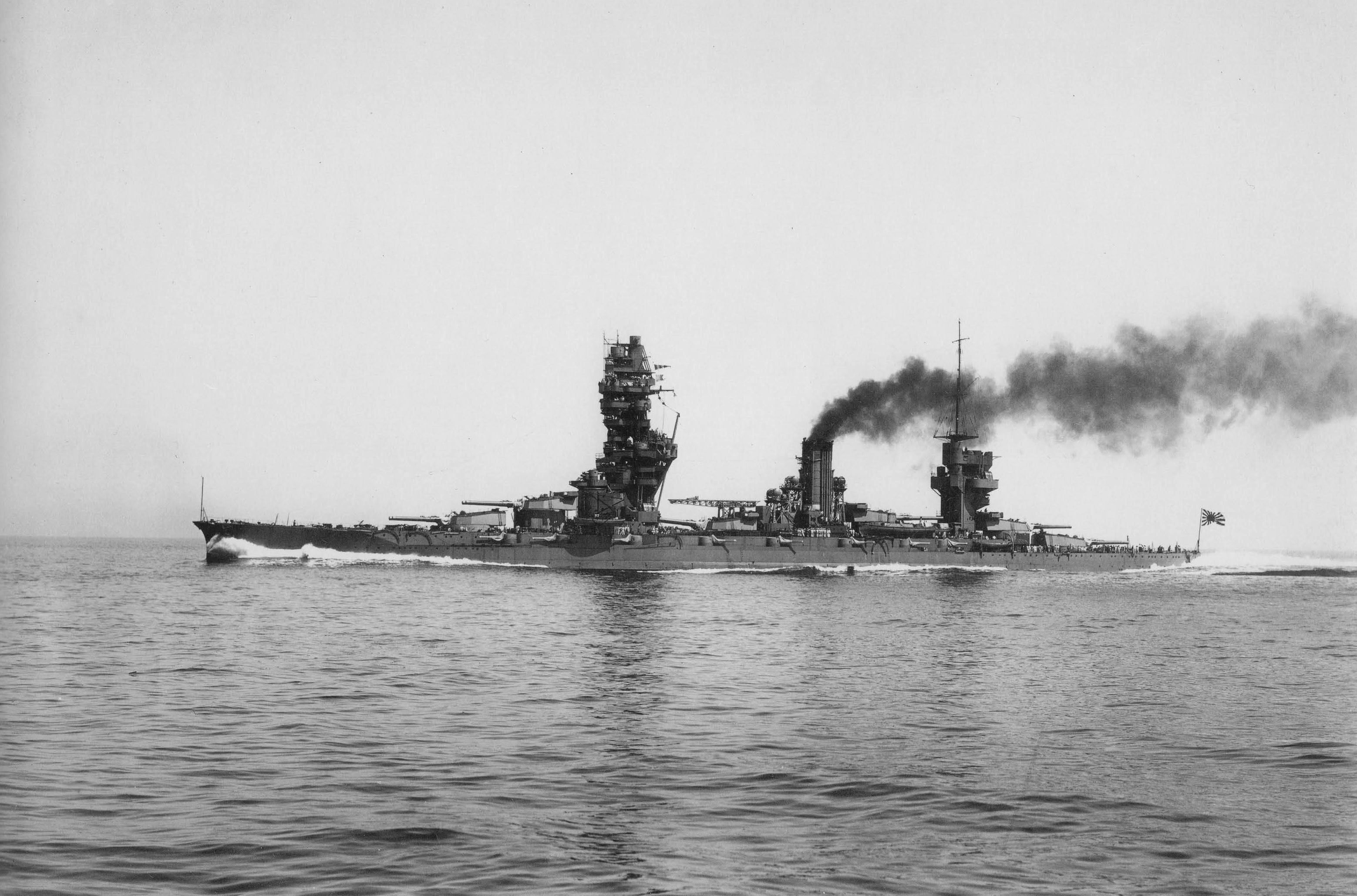
Fuso

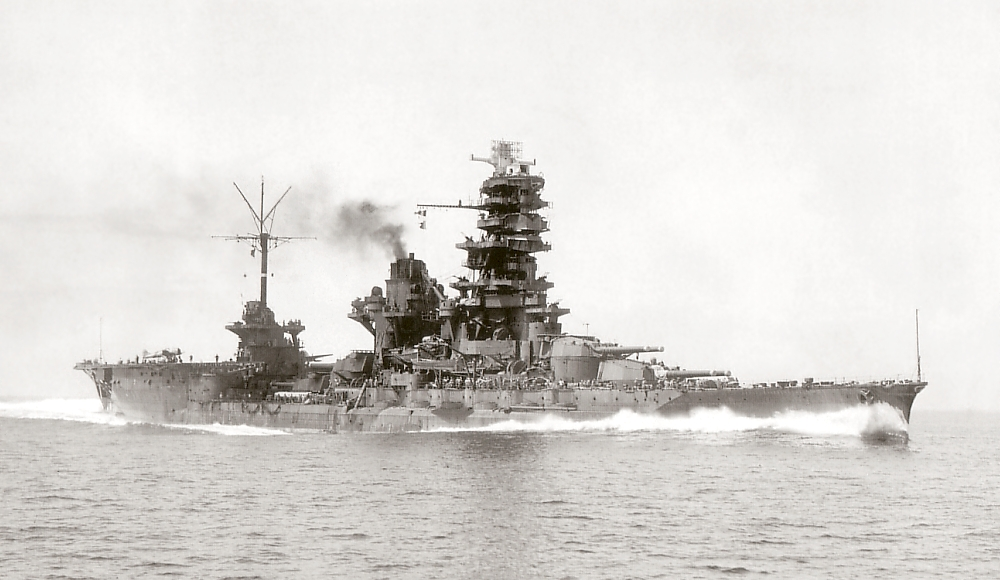
Ise after conversion

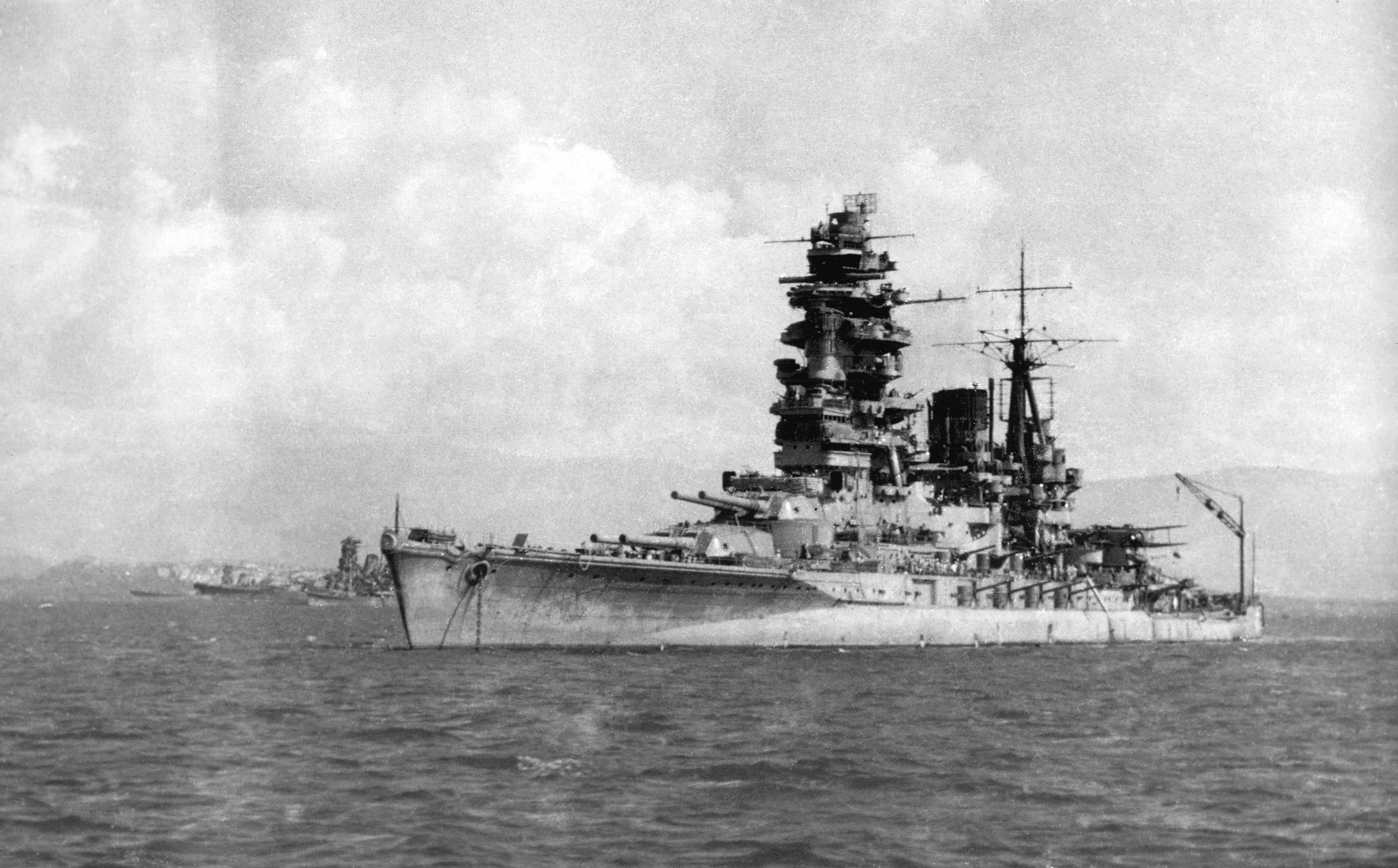
Nagato

Class	Displacement	Main Battery	Secondary Battery	Comple- ment	Speed	Ships in Class				
Class	Displacement	Main Battery	Secondary Battery	Comple- ment	Speed	Ship	Keel laid	Commis- sioned	War loss	Postwar
Kongō class	31,720 t exc. Kirishima 31,980	8x 14 in (360 mm)	14× 6 in (150 mm)	1,437	30.5 kn (56.5 km/h; 35.1 mph)	Kongō	Jan 1911	Aug 1913	sunk by USS Sealion (SS-315) Nov 1944	
Kongō class	31,720 t exc. Kirishima 31,980	8x 14 in (360 mm)	14× 6 in (150 mm)	1,437	30.5 kn (56.5 km/h; 35.1 mph)	Haruna	Mar 1912	Apr 1915	Hit in Bombing of Kure July 1945	Scrapped 1946
Kongō class	31,720 t exc. Kirishima 31,980	8x 14 in (360 mm)	14× 6 in (150 mm)	1,437	30.5 kn (56.5 km/h; 35.1 mph)	Hiei	Nov 1911	Apr 1915	Sunk at Naval Battle of Guadalcanal, Nov 1942	
Kongō class	31,720 t exc. Kirishima 31,980	8x 14 in (360 mm)	14× 6 in (150 mm)	1,437	30.5 kn (56.5 km/h; 35.1 mph)	Kirishima	Mar 1912	Apr 1915	Sunk at Naval Battle of Guadalcanal, Nov 1942	
Fusō class	34,700 t	12x 14 in (360 mm)	16× 6 in (150 mm)	1,376	25 kn (46 km/h; 29 mph)	Fusō	Mar 1912	Nov 1915	Sunk at Battle of Surigao Strait Oct 1944	
Fusō class	34,700 t	12x 14 in (360 mm)	16× 6 in (150 mm)	1,376	25 kn (46 km/h; 29 mph)	Yamashiro	Nov 1913	Mar 1917	Sunk at Battle of Surigao Strait Oct 1944	
Ise class ‡	42,001 t	12x 14 in (360 mm)	16x 140 mm (5.5 in)	1,376	25 kn (46 km/h; 29 mph)	Ise	May 1915	Nov 1915	Sunk by Air attack on Kure Jul 1945	
Ise class ‡	42,001 t	12x 14 in (360 mm)	16x 140 mm (5.5 in)	1,376	25 kn (46 km/h; 29 mph)	Hyūga	May 1915	Apr 1918	Sunk by Air attack on Kure Jul 1945	Scrapped, 1947
Nagato class	39,130 t	8x 410 mm (16 in)	18x 140 mm (5.5 in)	1,368	25 kn (46 km/h; 29 mph)	Nagato	Aug 1917	Nov 1920		Used at target in Operation Crossroads atomic bomb test, 1946
Nagato class	39,130 t	8x 410 mm (16 in)	18x 140 mm (5.5 in)	1,368	25 kn (46 km/h; 29 mph)	Mutsu	Jun 1918	Oct 1921	Internal explosion, Jun 1943	
Tosa class	38,500 t	10x 410 mm (16 in)	20x 140 mm (5.5 in)		26.5 kn (49.1 km/h; 30.5 mph)	Tosa	Feb 1920		Cancelled, 1922; hull used for tests and scuttled 1925	
Tosa class	38,500 t	10x 410 mm (16 in)	20x 140 mm (5.5 in)		26.5 kn (49.1 km/h; 30.5 mph)	Kaga	Jul 1920	Mar 1928	Completed as aircraft carrier	

‡ Before conversion to hybrid aircraft carriers

==== Super battleships ====
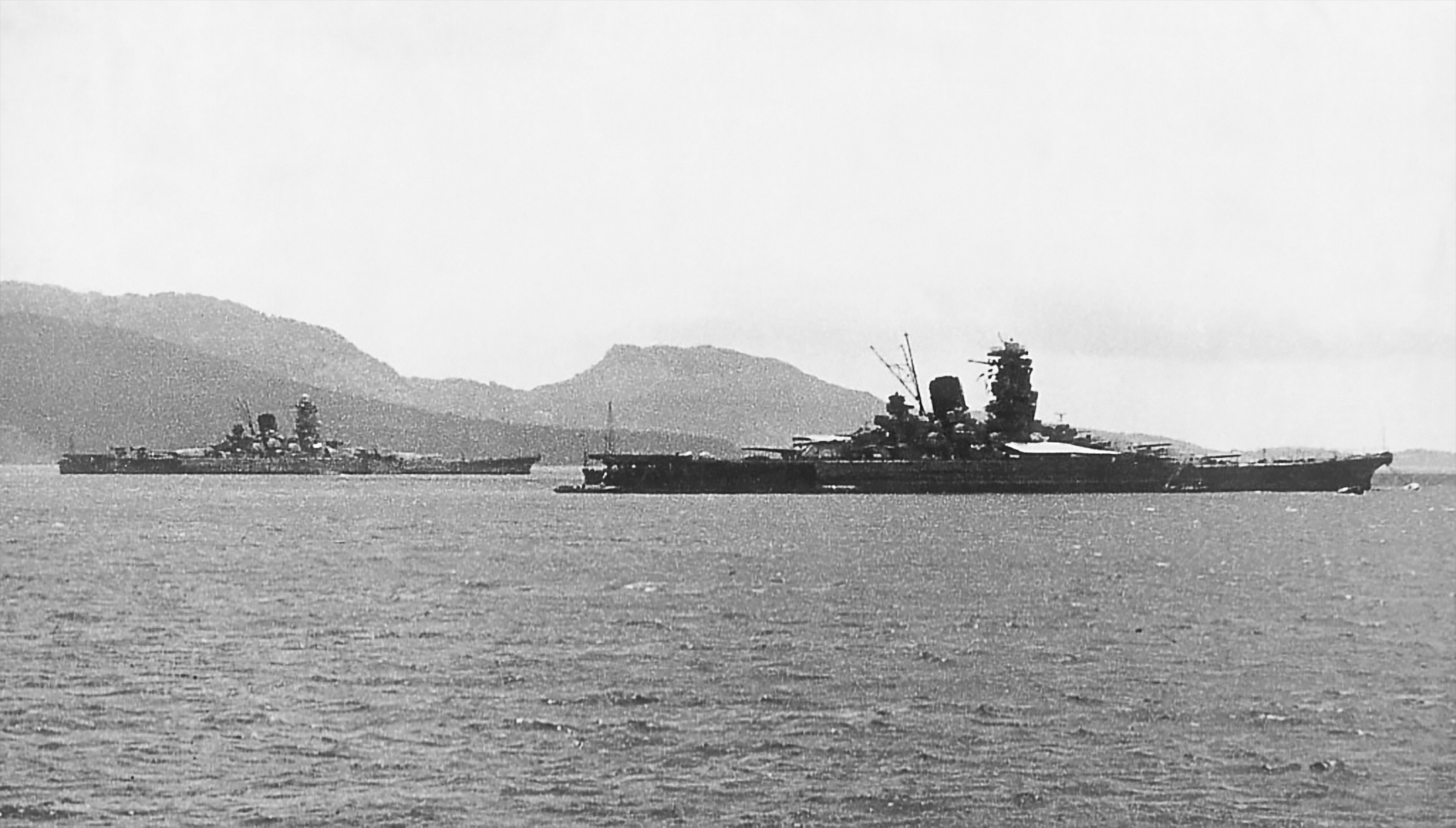
Yamato and Musashi in Truk Atoll, 1943

Class	Displacement	Main Battery	Secondary Battery	Complement	Speed	Ships in Class			
Class	Displacement	Main Battery	Secondary Battery	Complement	Speed	Ship	Keel Laid	Commissioned	War Loss
Yamato class	64,170 t	9x 460 mm (18 in)	12x 155 mm (6.1 in)	2,500	27.5 kn (50.9 km/h; 31.6 mph)	Yamato	Nov 1937	Dec 1941	Sunk by air attack during Operation Ten-Go Apr 1945
Yamato class	64,170 t	9x 460 mm (18 in)	12x 155 mm (6.1 in)	2,500	27.5 kn (50.9 km/h; 31.6 mph)	Musashi	Mar 1938	Aug 1942	Sunk at Battle of the Sibuyan Sea Oct 1944
Yamato class	64,170 t	9x 460 mm (18 in)	12x 155 mm (6.1 in)	2,500	27.5 kn (50.9 km/h; 31.6 mph)	Shinano	May 1940	completed as aircraft carrier	sunk by submarine attack 29 November 1944
Yamato class	64,170 t	9x 460 mm (18 in)	12x 155 mm (6.1 in)	2,500	27.5 kn (50.9 km/h; 31.6 mph)	Hull 111	scrapped		
Yamato class	64,170 t	9x 460 mm (18 in)	6x 155 mm (6.1 in)	2,500	27.5 kn (50.9 km/h; 31.6 mph)	Hull 797	cancelled		
Design A-150 battleship	70,000 t	6x 510 mm (20 in)	"Many" 100 mm (3.9 in)			Hull 798	cancelled		
Design A-150 battleship	70,000 t	6x 510 mm (20 in)	"Many" 100 mm (3.9 in)			Hull 799	cancelled		

== Seaplane tenders ==
- Wakamiya (1913)
- Notoro (1920)
- Akitsushima-class
  - Akitsushima
  - Chihaya (not completed)
- Kamoi
- Chitose class (converted to aircraft carriers)
  - Chiyoda
  - Chitose
- Mizuho
- Nisshin
- Kamikawa Maru class
  - Kamikawa Maru
  - Kiyokawa Maru
  - Kimikawa Maru
  - Kunikawa Maru

== Aircraft carriers ==
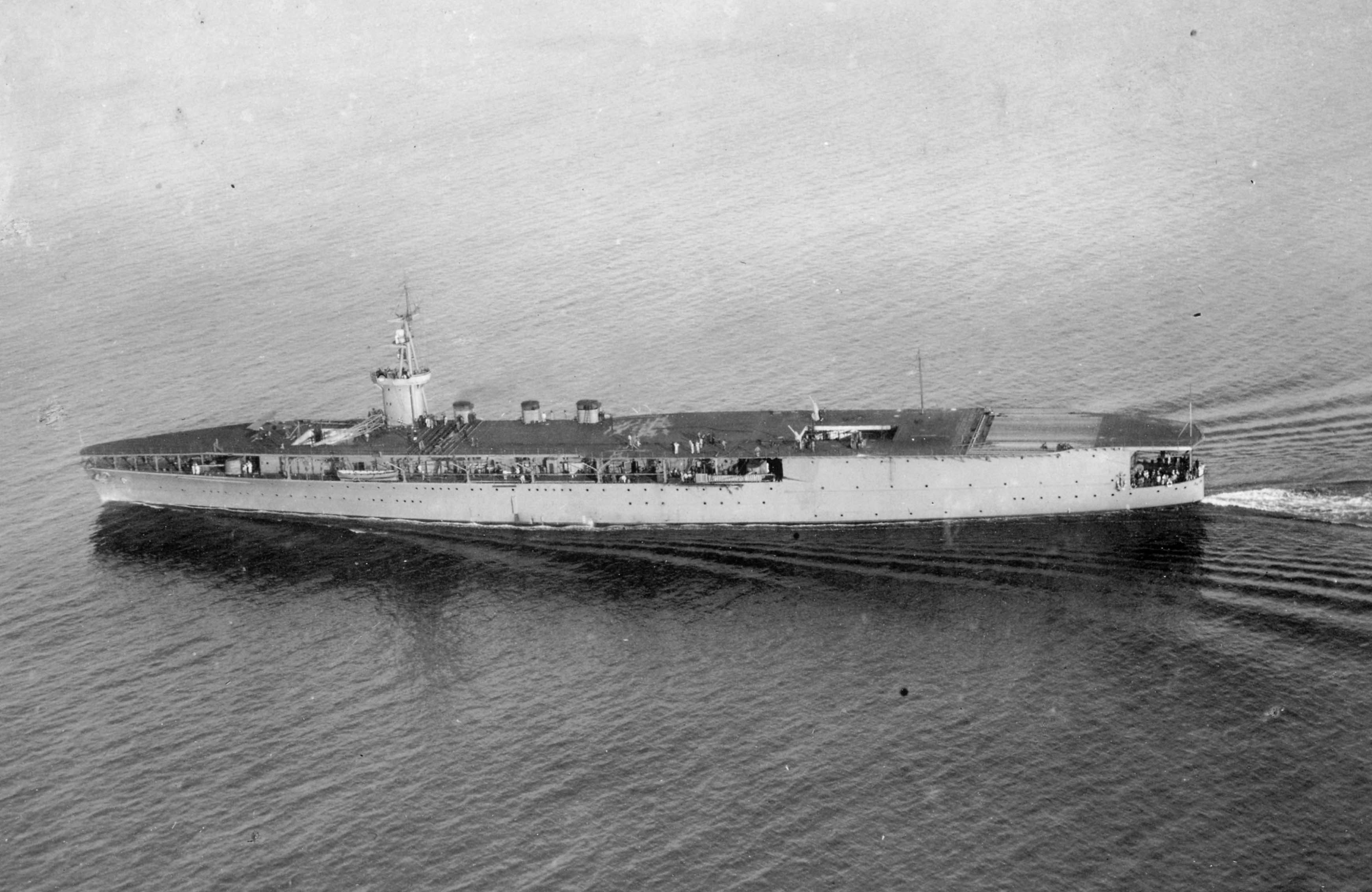
Hōshō (1921)

=== Standard aircraft carriers ===
- Akagi (1925)
- Kaga (1928)
- Sōryū (1935)
- Hiryū (1937)
- Shōkaku class
  - Shōkaku (1939)
  - Zuikaku (1939)

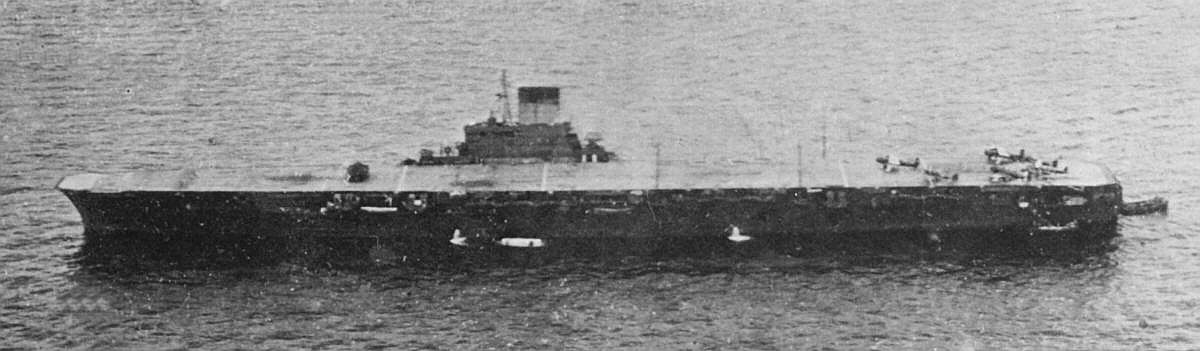
Taihō

- Taihō (1943)
- Unryū class
  - Amagi (1943)
  - Unryū (1943)
  - Katsuragi (1944)
  - Kasagi (not completed)
  - Aso (not completed)
  - Ikoma (not completed)
- Shinano (1944)

=== Light aircraft carriers ===
- Hōshō (1921)
- Ryūjō (1931)
- Zuihō class
  - Zuihō (converted from submarine tender in 1940)
  - Shōhō (converted from submarine tender in 1941)
- Hiyō class
  - Jun'yō (converted from ocean liner in 1941)
  - Hiyō (converted from ocean liner in 1941)
- Chitose class
  - Chiyoda (converted from seaplane tender in 1943)
  - Chitose (converted from seaplane tender in 1944)
- Ibuki (not completed, converted from heavy cruiser)

=== Escort aircraft carriers ===
- Taiyō class
  - Taiyō (converted from ocean liner in 1941)
  - Unyō (converted from ocean liner in 1942)
  - Chūyō (converted from ocean liner in 1942)
- Kaiyō (converted from ocean liner in 1942)
- Ryūhō (converted from submarine tender in 1942)
- Shin'yō (converted from ocean liner in 1943)
- Special 1TL Type auxiliary escort carrier
  - Shimane Maru (1944)
  - Otakisan Maru (not completed)

== Cruisers ==
=== Unprotected cruisers ===
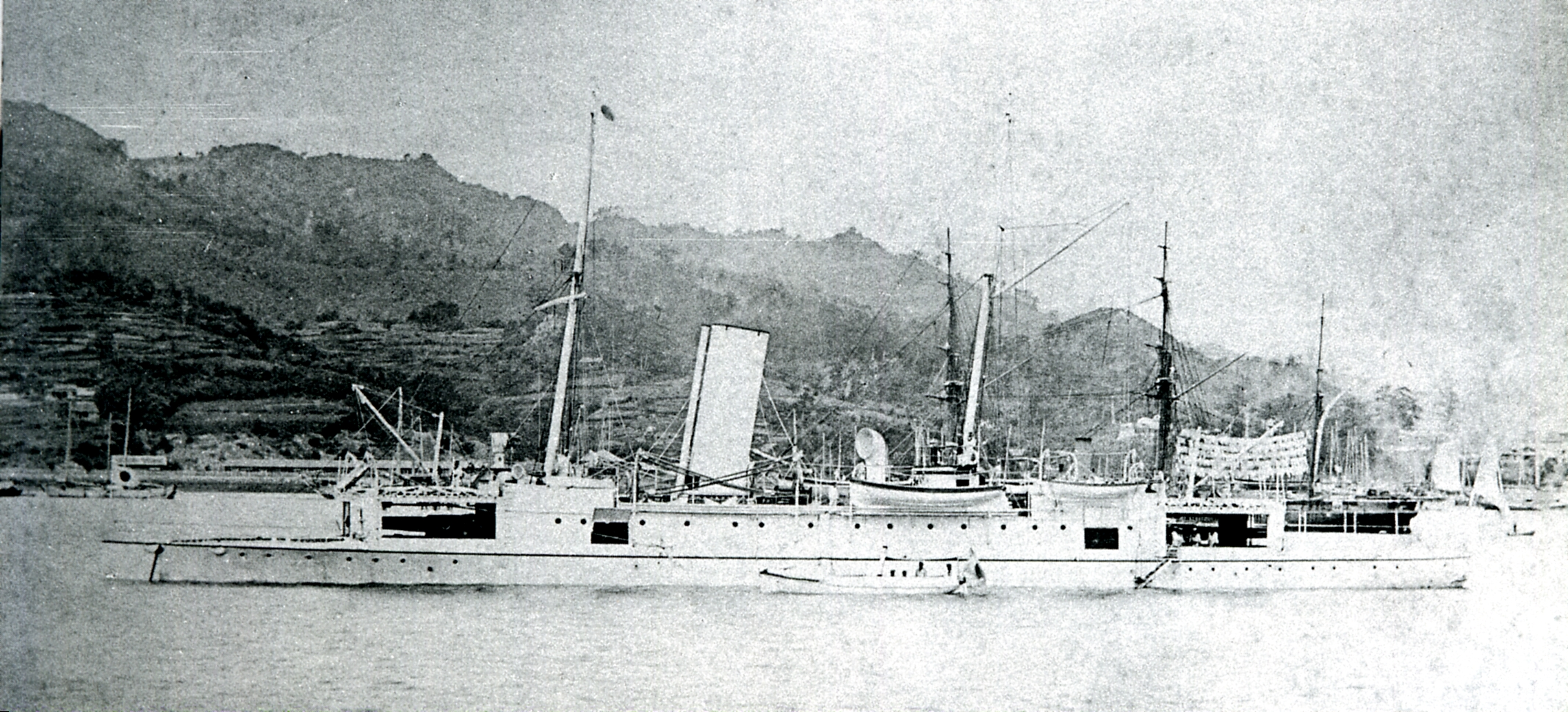
Tsukushi circa 1888

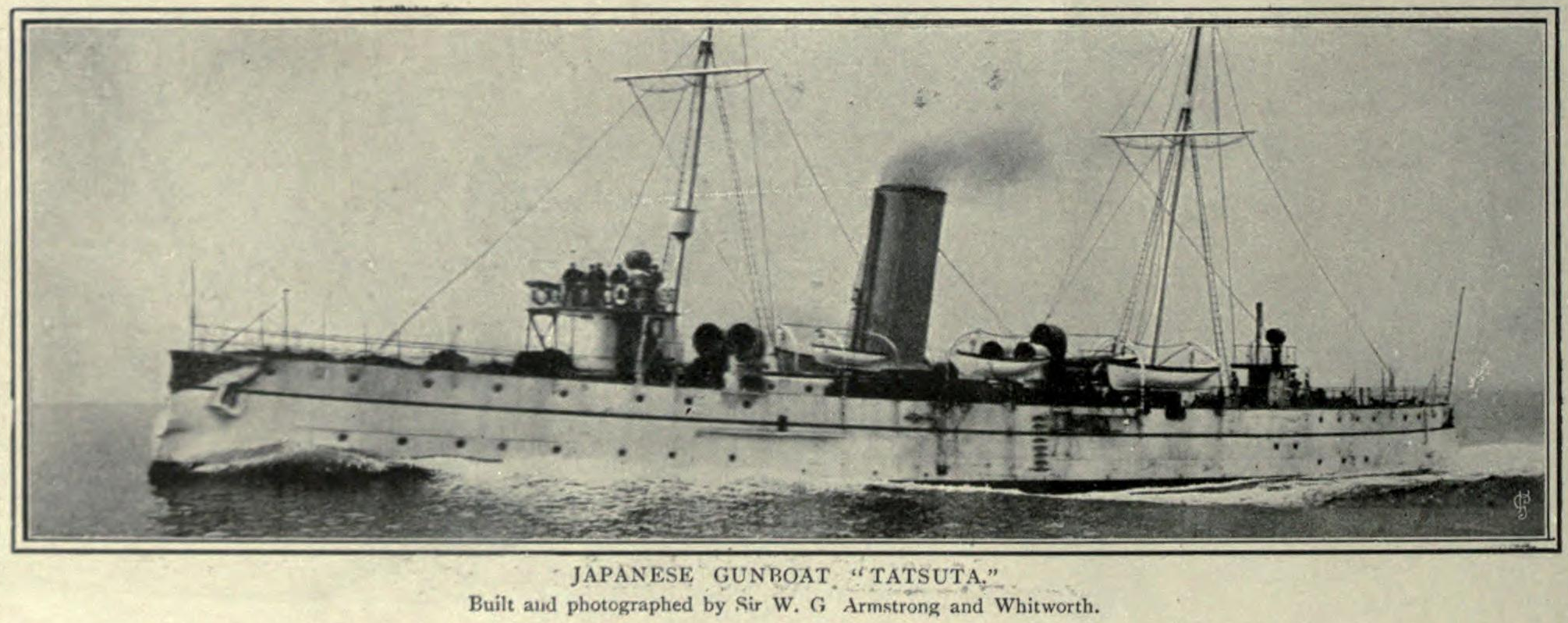
Tatsuta in 1894

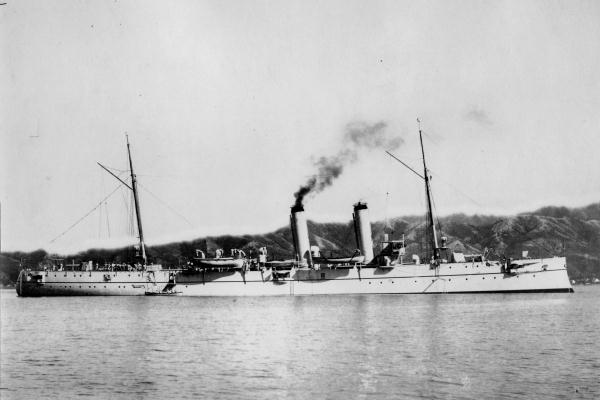
Miyako in 1902

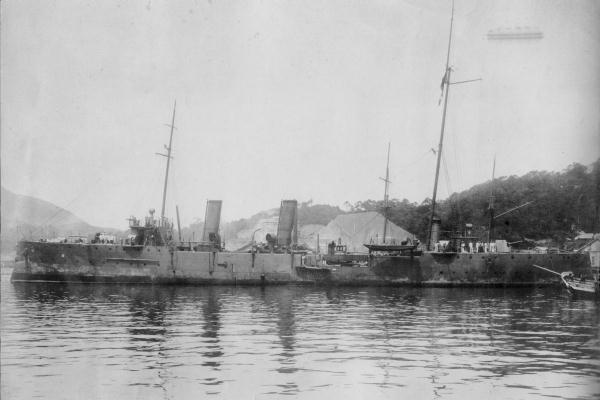
Chihaya in 1906

Class or Ship	Displace- ment	Main Battery	Secondary Battery	Torpedo Tubes	Comple- ment	Speed	Ships in Class			
Class or Ship	Displace- ment	Main Battery	Secondary Battery	Torpedo Tubes	Comple- ment	Speed	Ship	Keel Laid	Completed	Fate
Chilean cruiser Arturo Prat sold to Japan	1,370 t	2× 10 in (250 mm)	4x 120 mm (4.7 in)	2x 18 in (460 mm)	186	16.5 kn (30.6 km/h; 19.0 mph)	Tsukushi	Feb 1879	Jun 1883	Scrapped, 1911
Takao	1,778 t	4x 150 mm (5.9 in)	1x 4.7 in (120 mm)	2x 14 in (360 mm)	220	15 kn (28 km/h; 17 mph)	Takao	Oct 1886	Nov 1889	Scrapped, 1912
Yaeyama	1,609 t	3x 4.7 in (120 mm)	8× 47 mm (1.9 in)	2x 18 in (460 mm)	200	20.75 kn (38.43 km/h; 23.88 mph)	Yaeyama	Jun 1887	Mar 1890	Scrapped, 1912
Chishima	753 t	5x 76 mm (3.0 in)	6x 37 mm (1.5 in)	3x 15 in (380 mm)	90	19 kn (35 km/h; 22 mph)	Chishima	Jan 1890	Apr 1892	Sunk after collision, Nov 1892
Tatsuta	660 t	2x 4.7 in (120 mm)	4x 47 mm (1.9 in)	5x 18 in (460 mm)	100	21 kn (39 km/h; 24 mph)	Tatsuta	Apr 1893	Jul 1894	Scrapped, 1926
Miyako	1,800 t	2x 4.7 in (120 mm)	8x 47 mm (1.9 in)	2x 18 in (460 mm)	200	20 kn (37 km/h; 23 mph)	Miyako	May 1894	Mar 1899	Mined off Port Arthur, May 1904
Chihaya	1,258 t	2x 4.7 in (120 mm)	4x 47 mm (1.9 in)	2x 18 in (460 mm)	125	21 kn (39 km/h; 24 mph)	Chihaya	May 1898	Sep 1901	Scrapped, 1939

=== Protected cruisers ===
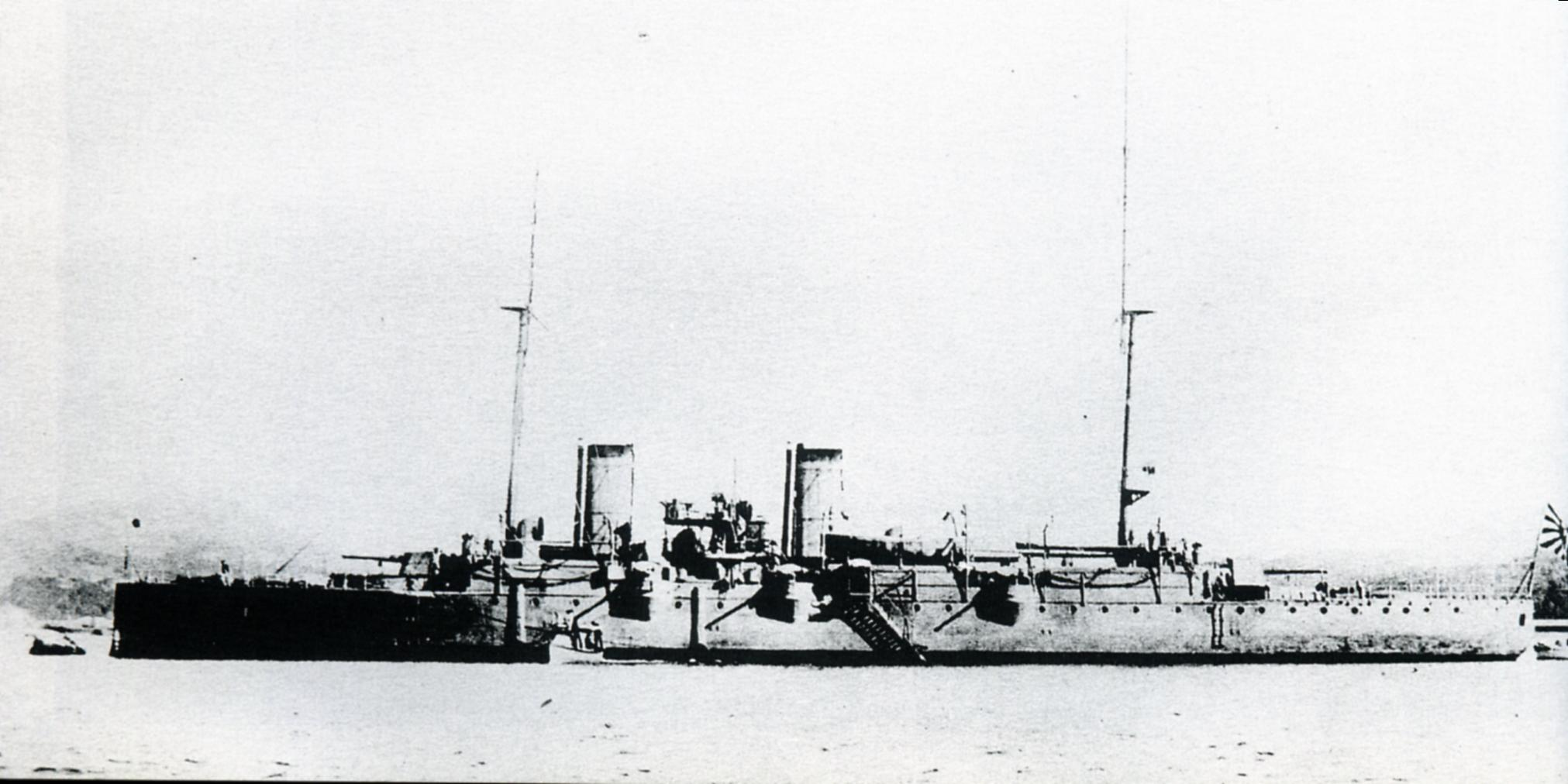
Izumi

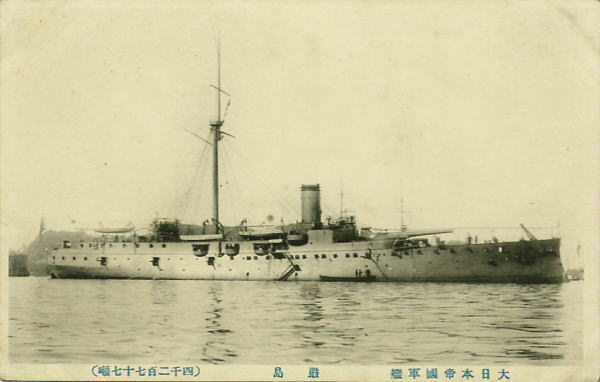
Itsukushima

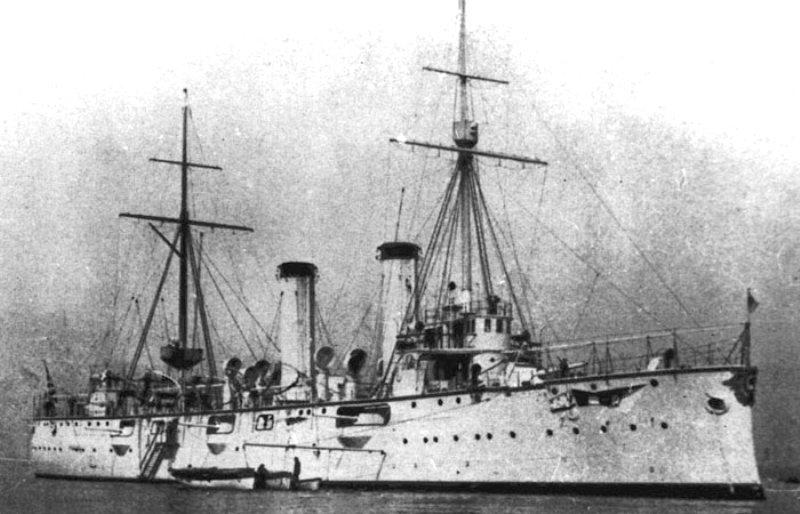
Akashi

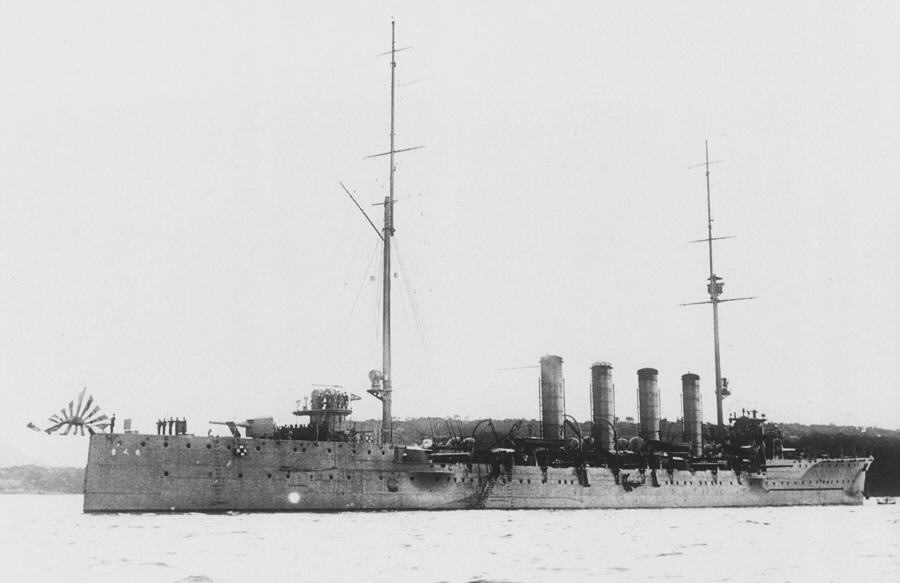
Chikuma

Class or Ship	Displace- ment	Main Battery	Secondary Battery	Torpedo Tubes	Comple- ment	Speed	Ships in Class			
Class or Ship	Displace- ment	Main Battery	Secondary Battery	Torpedo Tubes	Comple- ment	Speed	Ship	Keel Laid	Completed	Fate
ex-Chinese prize of First Sino-Japanese War Jiyuan	2,300 t	2x 8.2 in (210 mm)	1x 155 mm (6.1 in)	4	180	15 kn (28 km/h; 17 mph)	Saien	Jan 1883	Mar 1895	Mine, Nov 1904
Chilean corvette Esmeralda sold to Japan	2,950 t	2× 10 in (250 mm)	6x 6 in (150 mm)		296	18.3 kn (33.9 km/h; 21.1 mph)	Izumi	Apr 1881	1894	Scrapped
Naniwa class	3,727 t	2x 10.2 in (260 mm)	6x 155 mm (6.1 in)	4x 14 in (360 mm)	325	18 kn (33 km/h; 21 mph)	Naniwa	Mar 1884	Feb 1886	Sold for scrap, Jun 1913
Naniwa class	3,727 t	2x 10.2 in (260 mm)	6x 155 mm (6.1 in)	4x 14 in (360 mm)	325	18 kn (33 km/h; 21 mph)	Takachiho	Apr 1884	Mar 1886	Torpedoed off Tsingtao, Oct 1914
Unebi	3,615 t	4x 9.4 in (240 mm)	7x 155 mm (6.1 in)	4x 14 in (360 mm)	400	18 kn (33 km/h; 21 mph)	Unebi	May 1884	Oct 1886	Lost at sea, Dec 1886
Chiyoda	2,439 t	10x 120 mm (4.7 in)	14× 3-pdr.	3x 14 in (360 mm)	350	19 kn (35 km/h; 22 mph)	Chiyoda	Dec 1888	Jan 1891	Target, Aug 1927
Matsushima class	4,278 t	1x 12.66 in (322 mm)	11-12x 120 mm (4.7 in)	4x 14 in (360 mm)	360	16.5 kn (30.6 km/h; 19.0 mph)	Itsukushima	Jan 1888	Sep 1891	Scrapped, 1926
Matsushima class	4,278 t	1x 12.66 in (322 mm)	11-12x 120 mm (4.7 in)	4x 14 in (360 mm)	360	16.5 kn (30.6 km/h; 19.0 mph)	Matsushima	Feb 1888	Apr 1892	Explosion, Apr 1908
Matsushima class	4,278 t	1x 12.66 in (322 mm)	11-12x 120 mm (4.7 in)	4x 14 in (360 mm)	360	16.5 kn (30.6 km/h; 19.0 mph)	Hashidate	Aug 1888	Jun 1894	Scrapped, 1927
Akitsushima	3,100 t	4x 6 in (150 mm)	6x 120 mm (4.7 in)	4x 14 in (360 mm)	330	19 kn (35 km/h; 22 mph)	Akitsushima	Mar 1890	Mar 1894	Scrapped, 1927
Yoshino	4,150 t	4x 6 in (150 mm)	8x 120 mm (4.7 in)	5x 14 in (360 mm)	360	23 kn (43 km/h; 26 mph)	Yoshino	Dec 1892	Sep 1893	Collision, May 1904
Suma class	2,657 t	2x 6 in (150 mm)	6x 120 mm (4.7 in)	2x 15 in (380 mm)	256	20 kn (37 km/h; 23 mph)	Suma	Aug 1892	Dec 1896	Scrapped, 1928
Suma class	2,657 t	2x 6 in (150 mm)	6x 120 mm (4.7 in)	2x 15 in (380 mm)	256	20 kn (37 km/h; 23 mph)	Akashi	Aug 1894	Mar 1899	Target, Aug 1930
Takasago	4,160 t	2x 8 in (200 mm)	10x 120 mm (4.7 in)	5x 18 in (460 mm)	425	23.5 kn (43.5 km/h; 27.0 mph)	Takasago	Apr 1896	May 1898	Mined off Port Arthur, Dec 1904
Kasagi class	4,979 t	2x 8 in (200 mm)	10x 120 mm (4.7 in)	5x 14 in (360 mm)	405	22.5 kn (41.7 km/h; 25.9 mph)	Kasagi	Feb 1897	Oct 1898	Ran aground Tsugaru Strait, Jul 1916
Kasagi class	4,979 t	2x 8 in (200 mm)	10x 120 mm (4.7 in)	5x 14 in (360 mm)	405	22.5 kn (41.7 km/h; 25.9 mph)	Chitose	Jan 1898	Mar 1899	Target, Jul 1931
Niitaka class	3,366 t	6x 6 in (150 mm)	10× 12-pdr.		320	20 kn (37 km/h; 23 mph)	Niitaka	Jan 1902	Jan 1904	Wrecked Kamchatka Peninsula, Aug 1922
Niitaka class	3,366 t	6x 6 in (150 mm)	10× 12-pdr.		320	20 kn (37 km/h; 23 mph)	Tsushima	Oct 1901	Feb 1904	Target, 1944
Otowa	3,000 t	2x 6 in (150 mm)	6x 120 mm (4.7 in)		312	21 kn (39 km/h; 24 mph)	Otowa	Jan 1903	Sep 1904	Grounded in dense fog off Daiozaki, Shima peninsula, Jul 1917
Tone	4,113 t	2x 6 in (150 mm)	10x 120 mm (4.7 in)	3x 18 in (460 mm)	370	23 kn (43 km/h; 26 mph)	Tone	Nov 1905	May 1910	Target, Apr 1933
Chikuma class	5,000 t	8x 6 in (150 mm)	4× 12-pdr.	3x 18 in (460 mm)		36 kn (67 km/h; 41 mph)	Chikuma	Apr 1909	May 1912	Target, 1935
Chikuma class	5,000 t	8x 6 in (150 mm)	4× 12-pdr.	3x 18 in (460 mm)		36 kn (67 km/h; 41 mph)	Hirado	Aug 1910	Jul 1912	Scrapped, 1947
Chikuma class	5,000 t	8x 6 in (150 mm)	4× 12-pdr.	3x 18 in (460 mm)		36 kn (67 km/h; 41 mph)	Yahagi	Jun 1910	Jul 1912	Scrapped, 1947

==== Prizes of Russo-Japanese War ====
Class or Ship	Displace- ment	Main Battery	Secondary Battery	Torpedo Tubes	Comple- ment	Speed	Keel Laid	Commissioned into IJN	Fate
Tsugaru (ex-Russian Pallada)	6,932 t	8x 6 in (150 mm)	12x 3.1 in (79 mm)	3x 18 in (460 mm)	514	20 kn (37 km/h; 23 mph)	Dec 1895	Aug 1908	Scuttled, May 1924
Soya (ex-Russian Varyag)	6,500 t	12x 6 in (150 mm)	10x 3 in (76 mm)	4x 18 in (460 mm)	571	23 kn (43 km/h; 26 mph)	Oct 1899	Jul 1907	Returned to Russia, Apr 1916
Suzuya (ex-Russian Novik)	3,080 t	2x 120 mm (4.7 in)	4x 3 in (76 mm)		340	25 kn (46 km/h; 29 mph)	Feb 1900	May 1904	Sold, Apr 1913

=== Armored cruisers ===
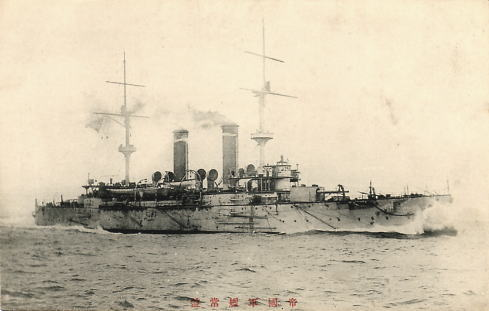
Tokiwa

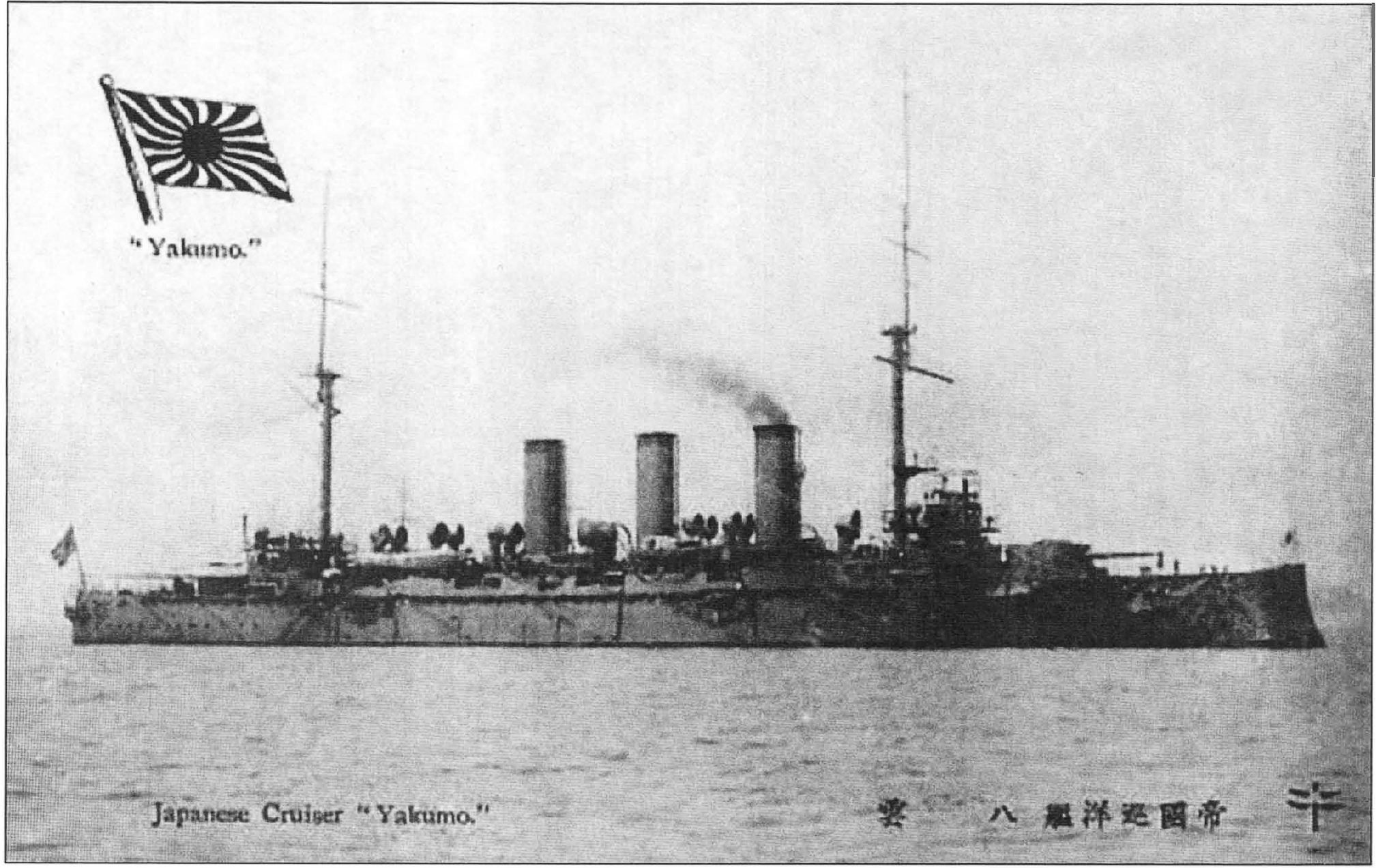
Yakumo

Class	Displace- ment	Main Battery	Secondary Battery	Torpedo Tubes	Comple- ment	Speed	Ships in Class			
Class	Displace- ment	Main Battery	Secondary Battery	Torpedo Tubes	Comple- ment	Speed	Ship	Keel Laid	Completed	Fate
Asama class	9,557 t	4x 8 in (200 mm)	14x 6 in (150 mm)	5x 18 in (460 mm)	676	21 kn (39 km/h; 24 mph)	Asama	Oct 1896	Mar 1899	Scrapped, 1947
Asama class	9,557 t	4x 8 in (200 mm)	14x 6 in (150 mm)	5x 18 in (460 mm)	676	21 kn (39 km/h; 24 mph)	Tokiwa	Jan 1897	May 1899	Air attack, Aug 1944
Izumo class	9,353 t	4x 8 in (200 mm)	14x 6 in (150 mm)	4x 18 in (460 mm)	672	20.75 kn (38.43 km/h; 23.88 mph)	Izumo	May 1898	Sep 1900	Air attack, Jul 1945
Izumo class	9,353 t	4x 8 in (200 mm)	14x 6 in (150 mm)	4x 18 in (460 mm)	672	20.75 kn (38.43 km/h; 23.88 mph)	Iwate	Nov 1898	Mar 1901	Air attack, Jul 1945
Yakumo	9,646 t	4x 8 in (200 mm)	12x 6 in (150 mm)	5x 18 in (460 mm)	670	20 kn (37 km/h; 23 mph)	Yakumo	Sep 1897	Jun 1900	Scrapped, Jul 1946
Azuma	9,278 t	4x 8 in (200 mm)	12x 6 in (150 mm)	5x 18 in (460 mm)	670	20 kn (37 km/h; 23 mph)	Azuma	Feb 1898	Jul 1900	Scrapped, 1946
Kasuga class	7,698 t	4x 8 in (200 mm).	14x 6 in (150 mm)	4x 18 in (460 mm)	600	20 kn (37 km/h; 23 mph)	Kasuga ex-Argentine Bernardino Rivadavia	Mar 1902	Jan 1904	Air attack, Jul 1945
Kasuga class	7,698 t	4x 8 in (200 mm).	14x 6 in (150 mm)	4x 18 in (460 mm)	600	20 kn (37 km/h; 23 mph)	Nisshin ex-Argentine Mariano Moreno	Mar1902	Jan1904	Target, 1936 and again 1942
Prize of Russo-Japanese War	7,802 t	2x 8 in (200 mm)	8x 6 in (150 mm)	2x 18 in (460 mm)	573	21 kn (39 km/h; 24 mph)	Aso (ex-Russian Bayan)	Mar 1899	Dec 1902	Target, Aug 1932

=== Other cruisers ===
==== Dispatch vessels ====
Class	Displace- ment	Main Battery	Secondary Battery	Torpedo Tubes	Comple- ment	Speed	Ships in Class			
Class	Displace- ment	Main Battery	Secondary Battery	Torpedo Tubes	Comple- ment	Speed	Ship	Keel Laid	Commis- sioned	Fate
Yodo class	1,270 t	2x 120 mm (4.7 in)	4× 12-pdr.	12x 610 mm (24 in)	116	22 kn (41 km/h; 25 mph)	Yodo	Oct 1906	Apr 1908	Scrapped, 1945
Yodo class	1,270 t	2x 120 mm (4.7 in)	4× 12-pdr.	12x 610 mm (24 in)	116	22 kn (41 km/h; 25 mph)	Mogami	Mar 1907	Sep 1908	Scrapped, 1929

==== Foreign ships ====
Class	Displace- ment	Main Battery	Secondary Battery	Torpedo Tubes	Comple- ment	Speed	Ships in Class			
Class	Displace- ment	Main Battery	Secondary Battery	Torpedo Tubes	Comple- ment	Speed	Ship	Keel Laid	Commis- sioned	Fate
Prize of World War I	4,350 t	6x 15cm/45 (5.9") SK L/45	2x 88mm/45 (3.46") SK L/45	2x45cm (17.7") C45/91S Torpedoe Tubes	380	27.25 kn (50.47 km/h; 31.36 mph)	Y (ex-German Augsburg)	1910		Scrapped, 1922
Ioshima-class (prizes of Second Sino-Japanese War, used as Kaibōkan)	2,526 t	6x 140 mm (5.5 in)	6x 3.1 in (79 mm)	4x 21 in (530 mm)	351	23 kn (43 km/h; 26 mph)	training vessel Mikura, Jul 1938; renamed Ioshima, Jun 1944 (ex-Chinese Ning-Hai)	Feb 1931	Sep 1932	Submarine, Sep 1944
Ioshima-class (prizes of Second Sino-Japanese War, used as Kaibōkan)	2,526 t	6x 140 mm (5.5 in)	6x 3.1 in (79 mm)	4x 21 in (530 mm)	351	23 kn (43 km/h; 26 mph)	barracks hulk Mishima, 1938; renamed Yasoshima, Jun 1944 (ex-Chinese P'ing-Hai)	Jun 1931	Jun 1936	Air attack, Nov 1944

=== In commission during World War II ===
==== Old light cruisers ====
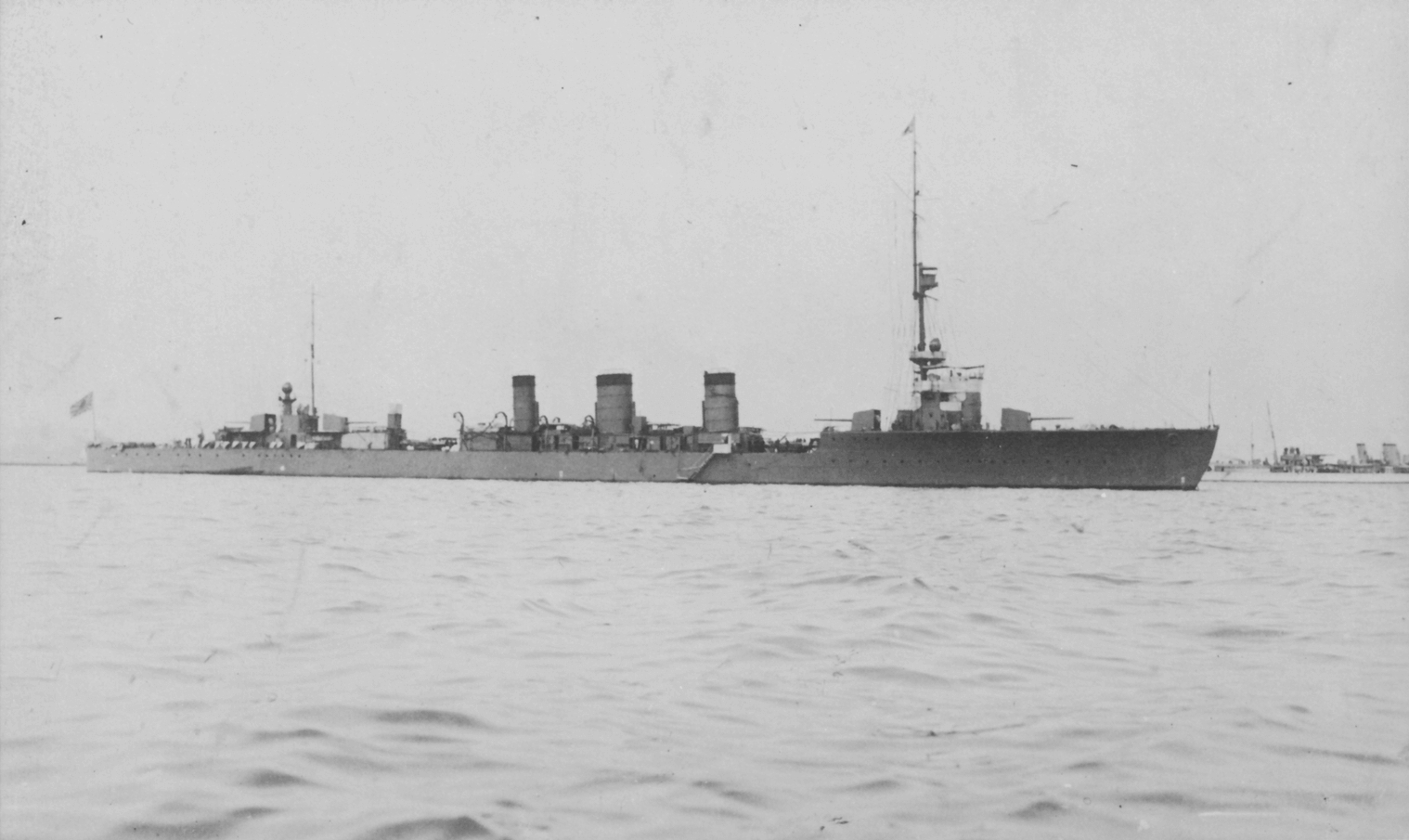
Tenryu

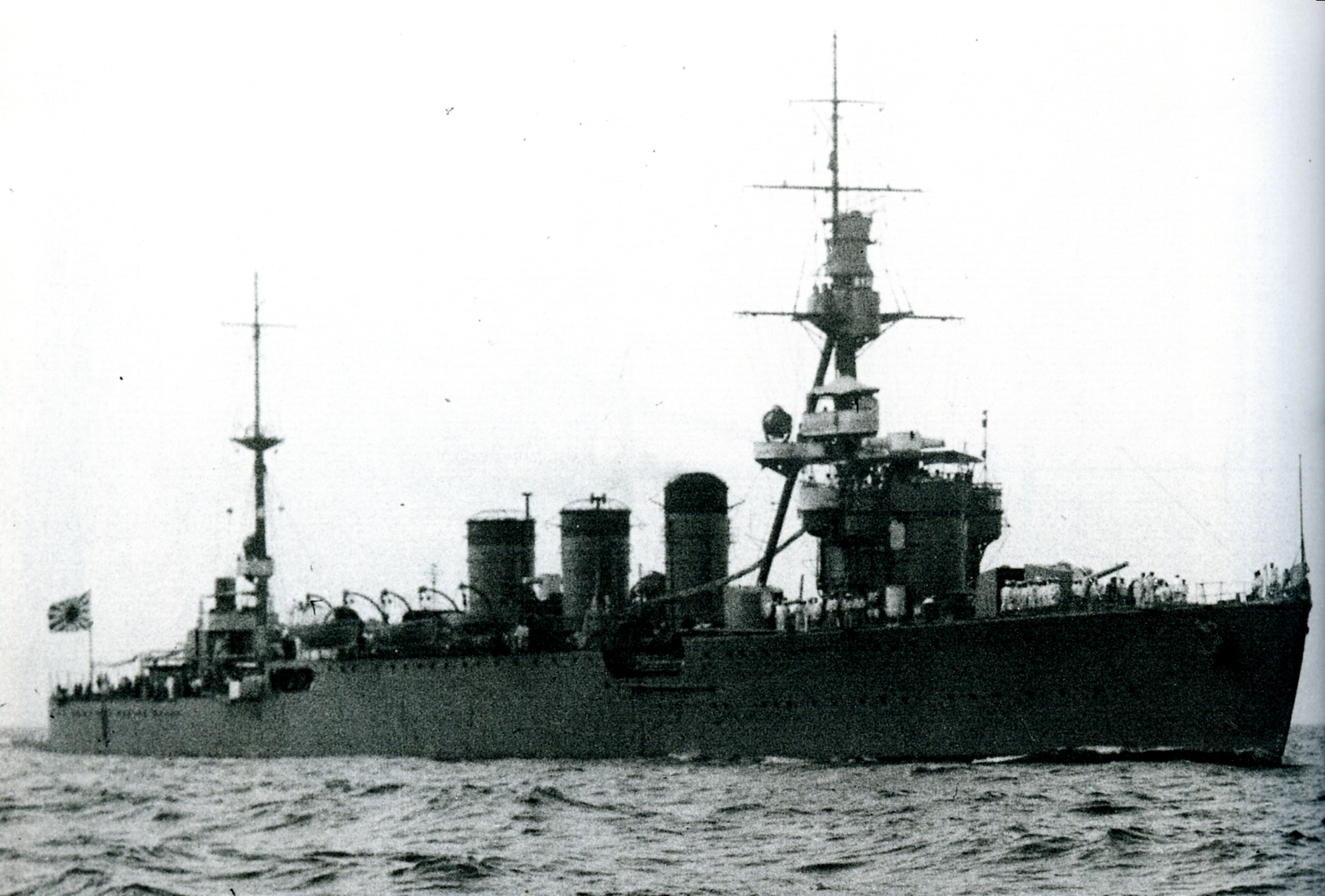
Kitakami

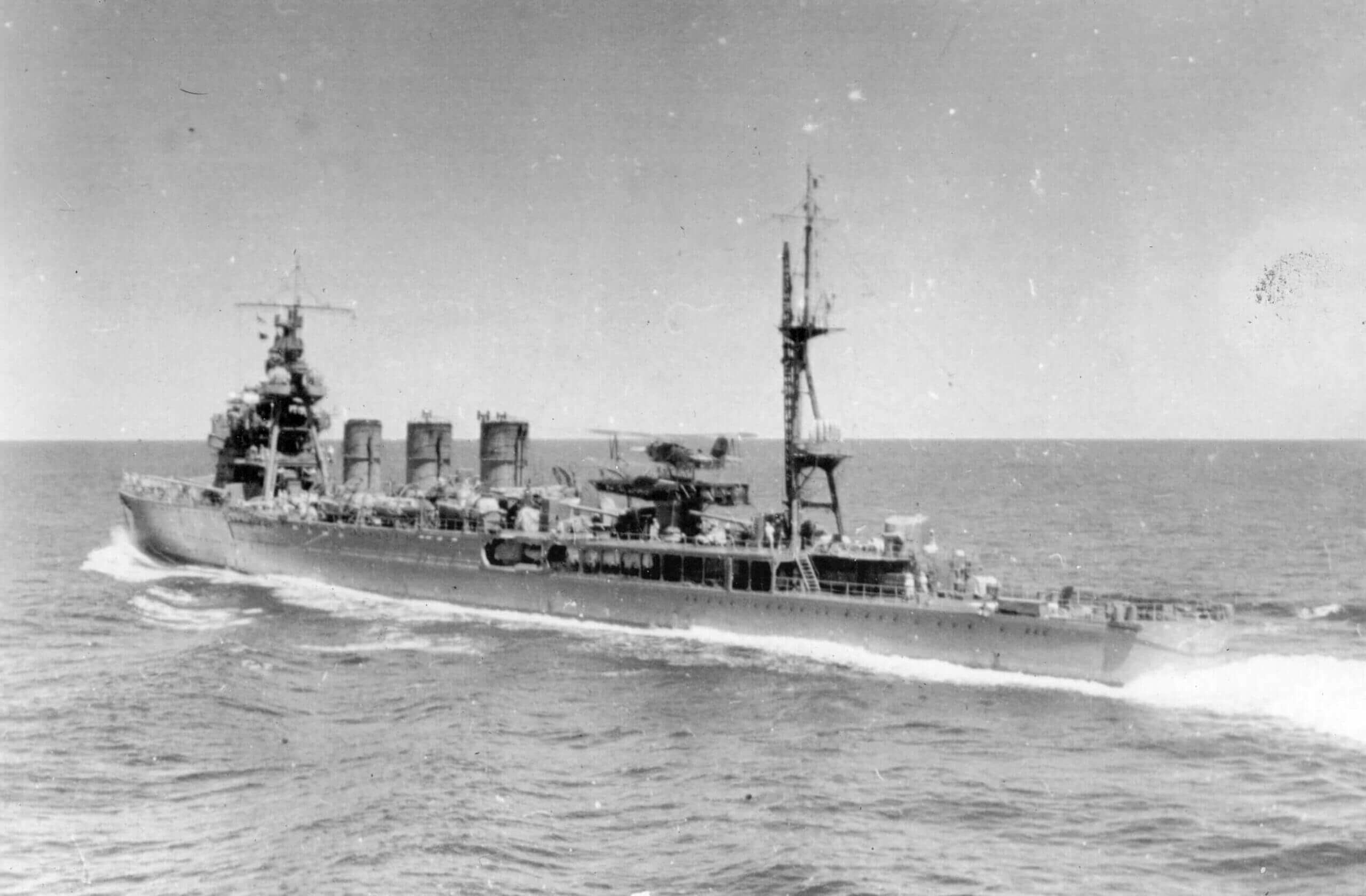
Abukuma

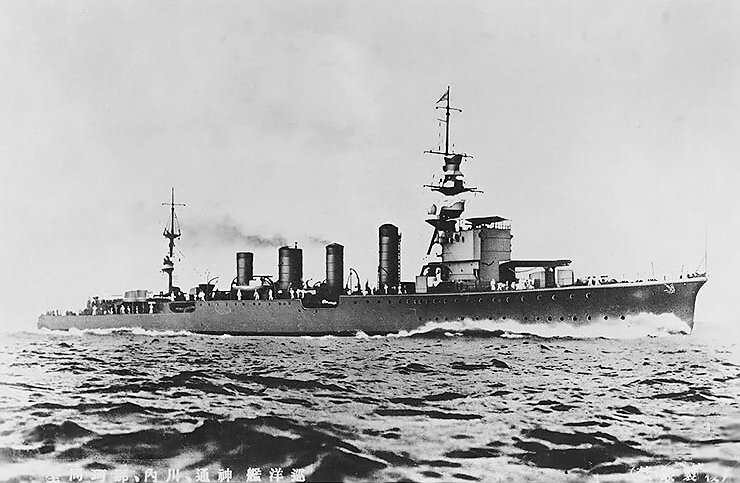
Sendai

Class	Displacement	Main Battery	Torpedo Tubes	Comple- ment	Speed	Ships in Class				
Class	Displacement	Main Battery	Torpedo Tubes	Comple- ment	Speed	Ship	Keel Laid	Commis- sioned	War Loss	Postwar
Tenryū class	3,230 t	4x 140 mm (5.5 in)	6x 21 in (530 mm)	332	33 kn (61 km/h; 38 mph)	Tatsuta	Jul 1917	May 1919	Submarine, Mar 1944	
Tenryū class	3,230 t	4x 140 mm (5.5 in)	6x 21 in (530 mm)	332	33 kn (61 km/h; 38 mph)	Tenryū	May 1917	Nov 1919	Submarine, Dec 1942	
Kuma class	5,870 t	7x 140 mm (5.5 in)	8x 610 mm (24 in)	439	31.75 kn (58.80 km/h; 36.54 mph)	Kuma	Aug 1918	Aug 1920	Submarine, Jan 1944	
Kuma class	5,870 t	7x 140 mm (5.5 in)	8x 610 mm (24 in)	439	31.75 kn (58.80 km/h; 36.54 mph)	Tama	Aug 1918	Jan 1921	Submarine, Oct 1944	
Kuma class	5,870 t	7x 140 mm (5.5 in)	8x 610 mm (24 in)	439	31.75 kn (58.80 km/h; 36.54 mph)	Kitakami	Sep 1919	Apr 1921		Scrapped, 1946
Kuma class	5,870 t	7x 140 mm (5.5 in)	8x 610 mm (24 in)	439	31.75 kn (58.80 km/h; 36.54 mph)	Kiso	Aug 1918	May 1921	Air attack, Nov 1944	
Kuma class	5,870 t	7x 140 mm (5.5 in)	8x 610 mm (24 in)	439	31.75 kn (58.80 km/h; 36.54 mph)	Ōi	Nov 1919	Oct 1921	Submarine, Jul 1944	
Nagara class	5,170 t	7x 140 mm (5.5 in)	8x 610 mm (24 in)	438	36 kn (67 km/h; 41 mph)	Nagara	Sep 1920	Apr 1922	Submarine, Oct 1944	
Nagara class	5,170 t	7x 140 mm (5.5 in)	8x 610 mm (24 in)	438	36 kn (67 km/h; 41 mph)	Natori	Dec 1920	Sep 1922	Submarine, Aug 1944	
Nagara class	5,170 t	7x 140 mm (5.5 in)	8x 610 mm (24 in)	438	36 kn (67 km/h; 41 mph)	Kinu	Jan 1921	Nov 1922	Air attack, Oct 1944	
Nagara class	5,170 t	7x 140 mm (5.5 in)	8x 610 mm (24 in)	438	36 kn (67 km/h; 41 mph)	Yura	May 1921	Mar 1923	Guadalcanal, Oct 1942	
Nagara class	5,170 t	7x 140 mm (5.5 in)	8x 610 mm (24 in)	438	36 kn (67 km/h; 41 mph)	Isuzu	Aug 1920	Aug 1923	Submarine, Apr 1945	
Nagara class	5,170 t	7x 140 mm (5.5 in)	8x 610 mm (24 in)	438	36 kn (67 km/h; 41 mph)	Abukuma	Dec 1921	May 1925	Air attack, Oct 1944	
Yūbari class	2,890 t	6x 140 mm (5.5 in)	4x 610 mm (24 in)	328	35.5 kn (65.7 km/h; 40.9 mph)	Yūbari	Jun 1922	Jul 1923	Submarine, Apr 1944	
Sendai class	5,195 t	7x 140 mm (5.5 in)	8x 610 mm (24 in)	450	35.25 kn (65.28 km/h; 40.56 mph)	Sendai	Feb 1922	Apr 1924	Empr. Aug. Bay, Nov 1943	
Sendai class	5,195 t	7x 140 mm (5.5 in)	8x 610 mm (24 in)	450	35.25 kn (65.28 km/h; 40.56 mph)	Jintsū	Aug 1922	Jul 1925	Kolombangara, Jul 1943	
Sendai class	5,195 t	7x 140 mm (5.5 in)	8x 610 mm (24 in)	450	35.25 kn (65.28 km/h; 40.56 mph)	Naka	Jun 1922	Nov 1925	Truk, Feb 1944	

==== Heavy cruisers ====
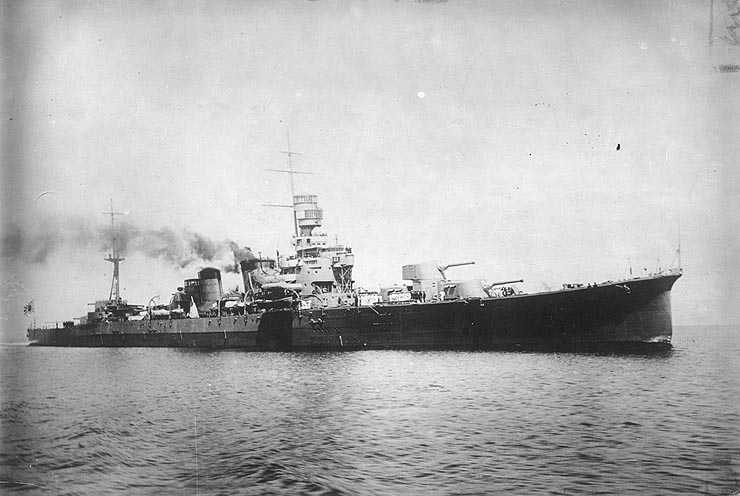
Kako

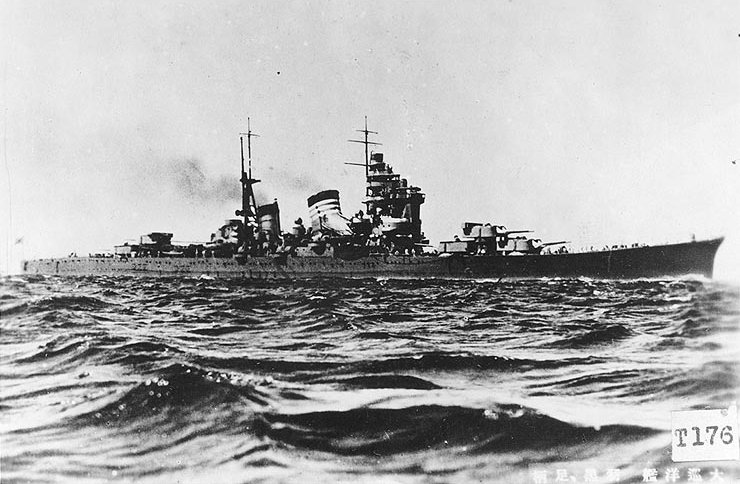
Haguro

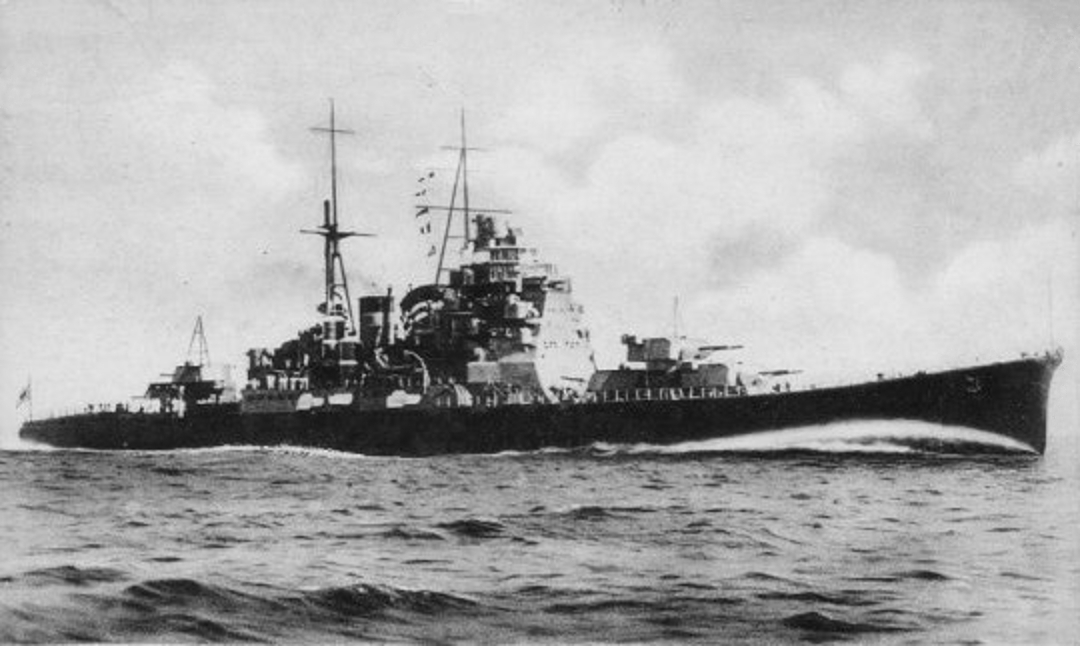
Maya

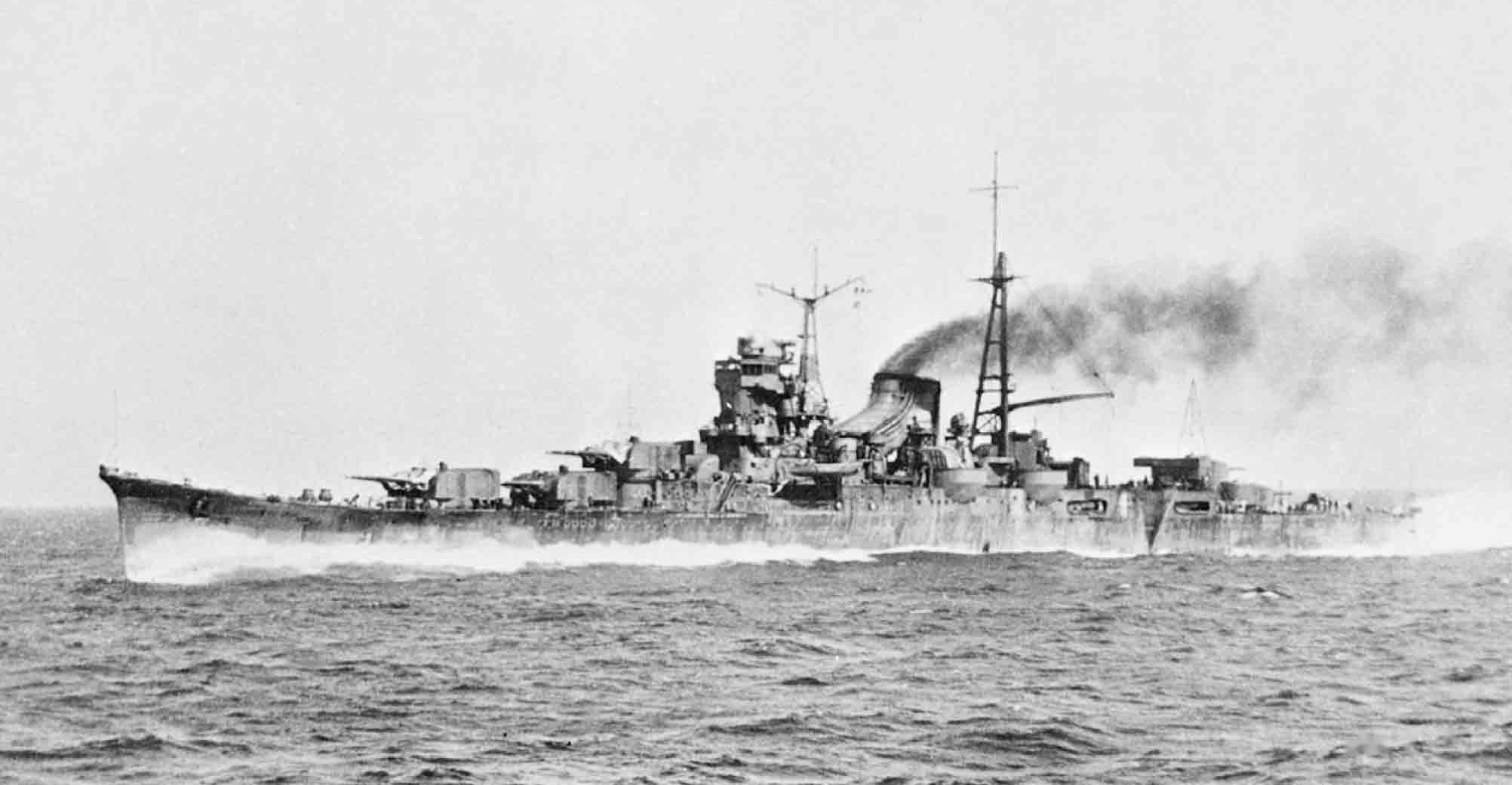
Mogami

Class	Displacement	Main Battery	Torpedo Tubes	Complement	Speed	Ships in Class				
Class	Displacement	Main Battery	Torpedo Tubes	Complement	Speed	Ship	Keel Laid	Commis- sioned	War Loss	Postwar
Furutaka class	9,150 t	6x 200 mm (7.9 in)	12x 610 mm (24 in)	625	33 kn (61 km/h; 38 mph)	Furutaka	Dec 1922	Mar 1926	Cape Esperance, Oct 1942	
Furutaka class	9,150 t	6x 200 mm (7.9 in)	12x 610 mm (24 in)	625	33 kn (61 km/h; 38 mph)	Kako	Dec 1922	Jul 1926	Submarine, Aug 1942	
Aoba class	9,380 t exc. Aoba 9,000	6x 200 mm (7.9 in)	12x 610 mm (24 in)	773	33.3 kn (61.7 km/h; 38.3 mph)	Aoba	Jan 1924	Sep 1927	Air attack, Jul 1945	
Aoba class	9,380 t exc. Aoba 9,000	6x 200 mm (7.9 in)	12x 610 mm (24 in)	773	33.3 kn (61.7 km/h; 38.3 mph)	Kinugasa	Oct 1924	Sep 1927	Guadalcanal, Nov 1942	
Myōkō class	13,380 t	10x 200 mm (7.9 in)	16x 610 mm (24 in)	773	33.75 kn (62.51 km/h; 38.84 mph)	Myōkō	Oct 1924	Jul 1929		Scuttled, 1946
Myōkō class	13,380 t	10x 200 mm (7.9 in)	16x 610 mm (24 in)	773	33.75 kn (62.51 km/h; 38.84 mph)	Nachi	Nov 1924	Nov 1928	Air attack, Nov 1944	
Myōkō class	13,380 t	10x 200 mm (7.9 in)	16x 610 mm (24 in)	773	33.75 kn (62.51 km/h; 38.84 mph)	Haguro	Mar 1925	Apr 1929	Surface action, May 1945	
Myōkō class	13,380 t	10x 200 mm (7.9 in)	16x 610 mm (24 in)	773	33.75 kn (62.51 km/h; 38.84 mph)	Ashigara	Apr 1925	Aug 1929	Surface action, Jun 1945	
Takao class	13,160 t	10x 8 in (200 mm)	16x 610 mm (24 in)	773	34.25 kn (63.43 km/h; 39.41 mph)	Takao	Apr 1927	Mar 1932		Target, 1946
Takao class	13,160 t	10x 8 in (200 mm)	16x 610 mm (24 in)	773	34.25 kn (63.43 km/h; 39.41 mph)	Atago	Apr 1927	Mar 1932	Submarine, Oct 1944	
Takao class	13,160 t	10x 8 in (200 mm)	16x 610 mm (24 in)	773	34.25 kn (63.43 km/h; 39.41 mph)	Chōkai	Apr 1931	Jun 1932	Off Samar, Oct 1944	
Takao class	13,160 t	10x 8 in (200 mm)	16x 610 mm (24 in)	773	34.25 kn (63.43 km/h; 39.41 mph)	Maya	Dec 1928	Jun 1932	Submarine, Oct 1944	
Mogami class	12,400 t	10x 8 in (200 mm)	12x 610 mm (24 in)	850	34.75 kn (64.36 km/h; 39.99 mph)	Mogami	Oct 1931	Jul 1935	Surigao Strait, Oct 1944	
Mogami class	12,400 t	10x 8 in (200 mm)	12x 610 mm (24 in)	850	34.75 kn (64.36 km/h; 39.99 mph)	Mikuma	Dec 1931	Aug 1935	Midway, Jun 1942	
Mogami class	12,400 t	10x 8 in (200 mm)	12x 610 mm (24 in)	850	34.75 kn (64.36 km/h; 39.99 mph)	Suzuya	Dec 1933	Oct 1937	Off Samar, Oct 1944	
Mogami class	12,400 t	10x 8 in (200 mm)	12x 610 mm (24 in)	850	34.75 kn (64.36 km/h; 39.99 mph)	Kumano	Apr 1934	Jul 1935	Air attack, Nov 1944	
Tone class	11,215 t	8x 8 in (200 mm)	12x 610 mm (24 in)	850	35 kn (65 km/h; 40 mph)	Tone	Dec 1934	Nov 1938	Air attack, Jul 1945	
Tone class	11,215 t	8x 8 in (200 mm)	12x 610 mm (24 in)	850	35 kn (65 km/h; 40 mph)	Chikuma	Oct 1935	May 1939	Off Samar, Oct 1944	
Ibuki class	12,200 t	10x 8 in (200 mm)	16x 610 mm (24 in)		35 kn (65 km/h; 40 mph)	Ibuki	Apr 1942	May 1943	completed as aircraft carrier	
Ibuki class	12,200 t	10x 8 in (200 mm)	16x 610 mm (24 in)		35 kn (65 km/h; 40 mph)	No. 301	cancelled	cancelled		

==== New light cruisers ====
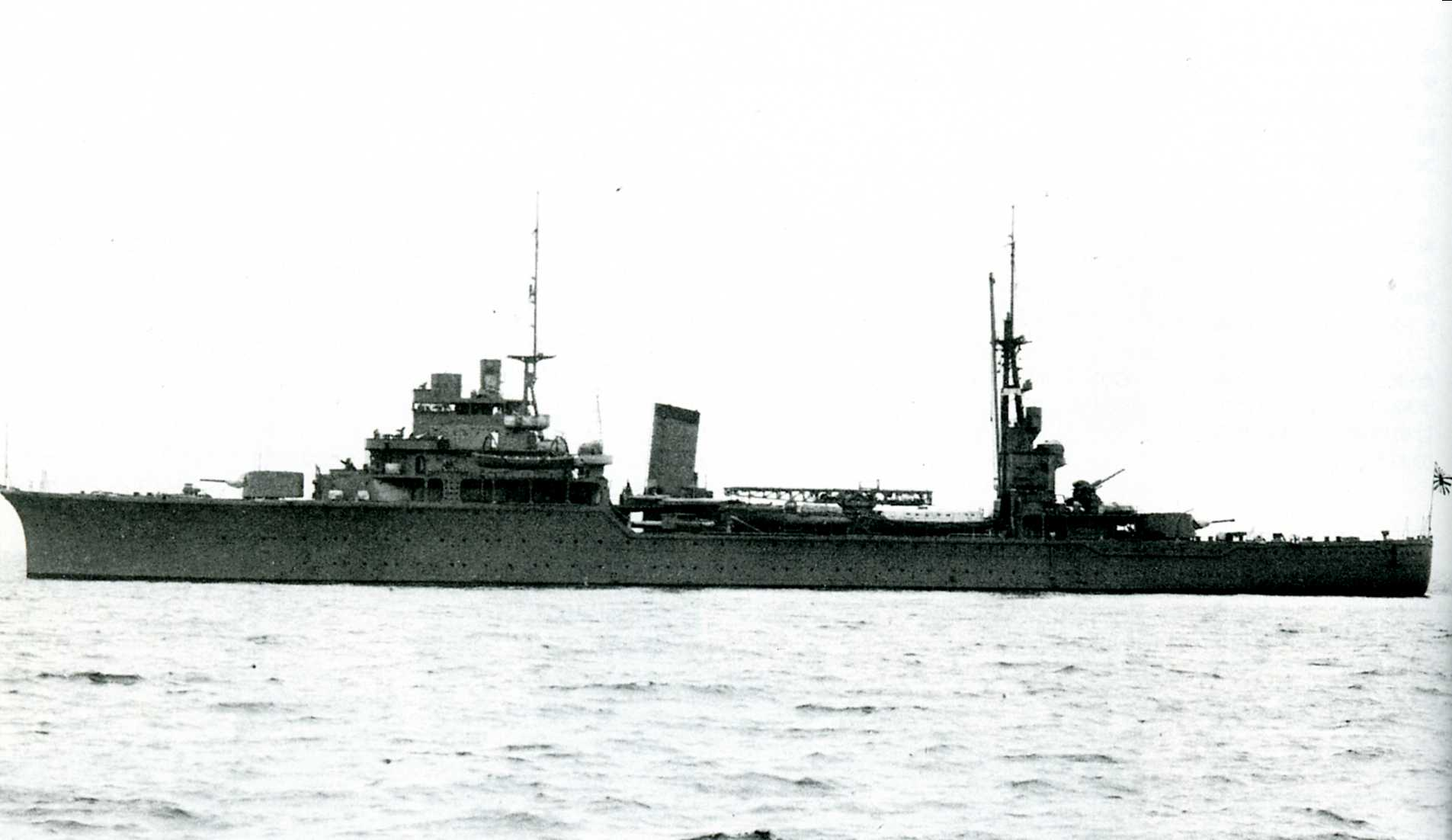
Kashii

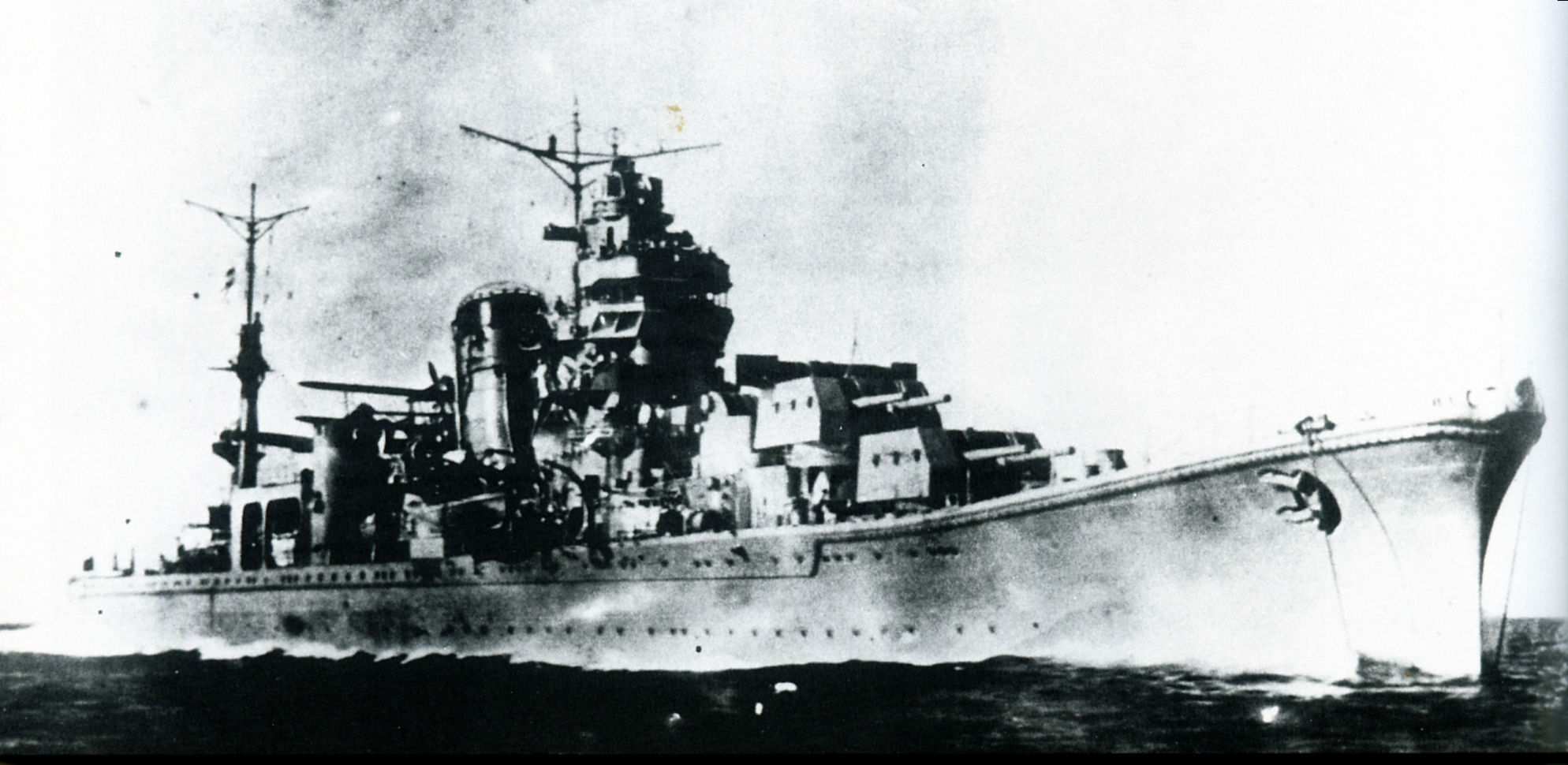
Agano

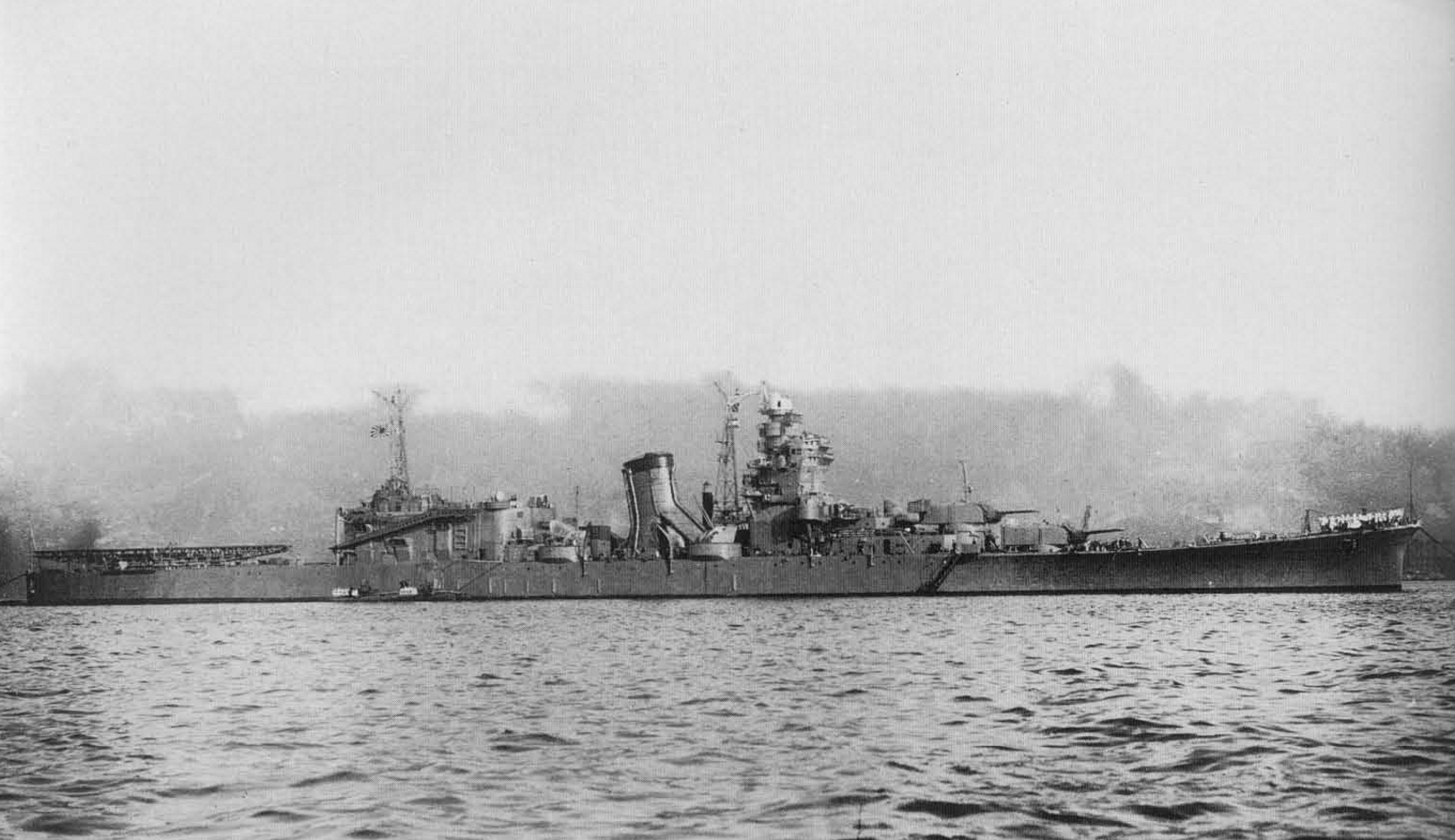
Ōyodo

Class	Displacement	Main Battery	Torpedo Tubes	Comple- ment	Speed	Ships in Class				
Class	Displacement	Main Battery	Torpedo Tubes	Comple- ment	Speed	Ship	Keel Laid	Commis- sioned	War Loss	Postwar
Katori class	5,890 t	4x 140 mm (5.5 in)	4x 21 in (530 mm)	590	18 kn (33 km/h; 21 mph)	Katori	Aug 1938	Apr 1940	Truk, Feb 1944	
Katori class	5,890 t	4x 140 mm (5.5 in)	4x 21 in (530 mm)	590	18 kn (33 km/h; 21 mph)	Kashima	Oct 1938	May 1940		Scrapped, 1947
Katori class	5,890 t	4x 140 mm (5.5 in)	4x 21 in (530 mm)	590	18 kn (33 km/h; 21 mph)	Kashii	Oct 1939	Jul 1941	Air attack, Jan 1945	
Katori class	5,890 t	4x 140 mm (5.5 in)	4x 21 in (530 mm)	590	18 kn (33 km/h; 21 mph)	Kashiwara	cancelled	cancelled		
Agano class	6,652 t	6x 6 in (150 mm)	8x 610 mm (24 in)	730	35 kn (65 km/h; 40 mph)	Agano	Jun 1940	Oct 1942	Submarine, Feb 1945	
Agano class	6,652 t	6x 6 in (150 mm)	8x 610 mm (24 in)	730	35 kn (65 km/h; 40 mph)	Noshiro	Sep 1941	Jun 1943	Air attack, Oct 1944	
Agano class	6,652 t	6x 6 in (150 mm)	8x 610 mm (24 in)	730	35 kn (65 km/h; 40 mph)	Yahagi	Nov 1941	Dec 1943	Air attack, Apr 1945	
Agano class	6,652 t	6x 6 in (150 mm)	8x 610 mm (24 in)	730	35 kn (65 km/h; 40 mph)	Sakawa	Nov 1942	Nov 1944		Atomic bomb test, Jul 1946
Ōyodo class	8,164 t	6x 155 mm (6.1 in)	designed to carry 6 seaplanes	782	36 kn (67 km/h; 41 mph)	Ōyodo	Feb 1941	Feb 1943	Air attack, Jul 1945	Scrapped, 1948
Ōyodo class	8,164 t	6x 155 mm (6.1 in)	designed to carry 6 seaplanes	782	36 kn (67 km/h; 41 mph)	Niyodo	cancelled	cancelled		

== Destroyers ==
=== 1st Class destroyers ===
==== World War I era ====
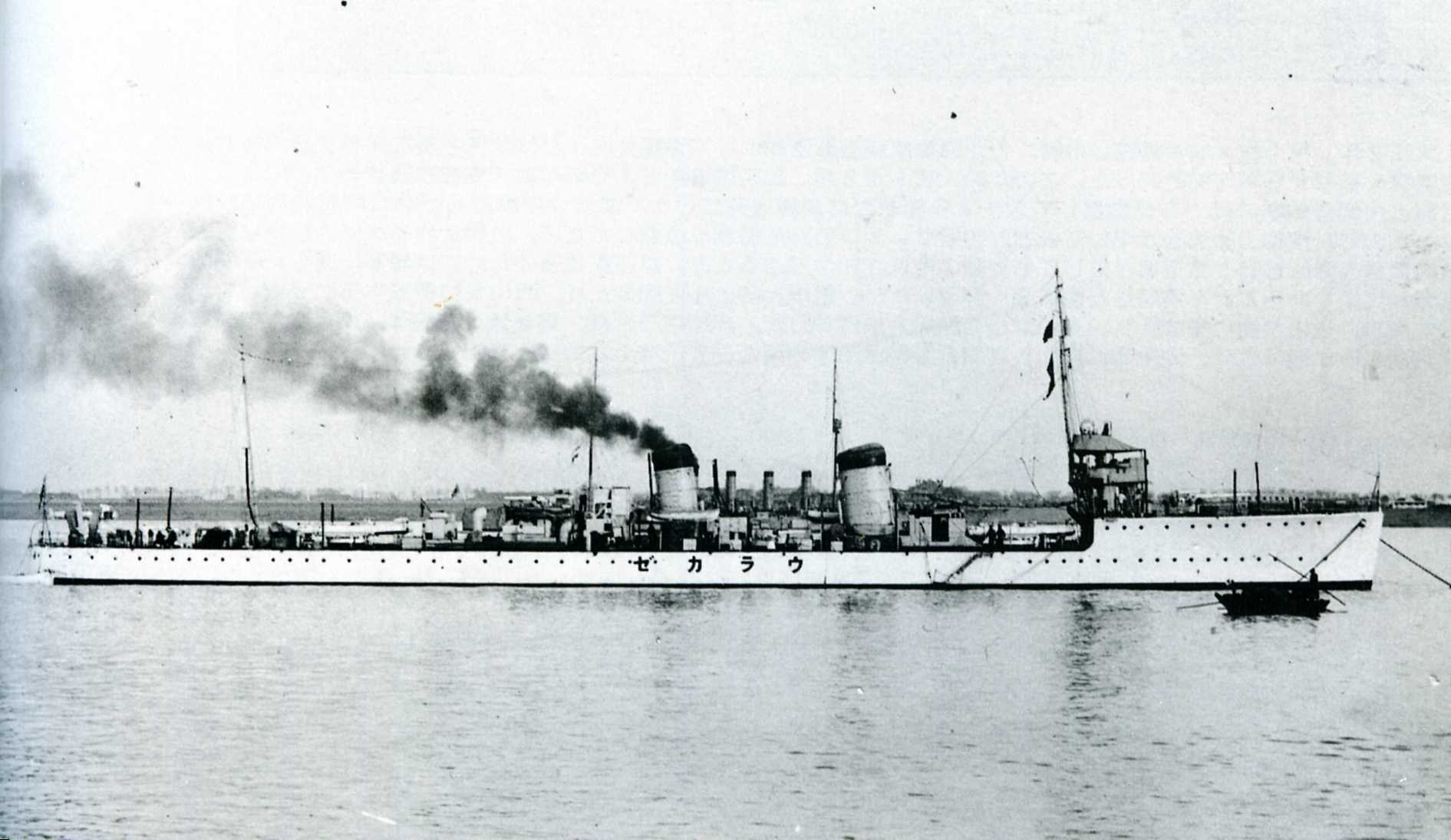
Urakaze

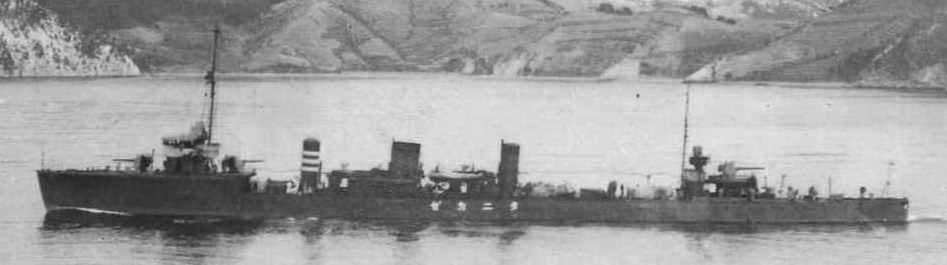
Tanikaze

Class	Displacement	Main Battery	Torpedo Tubes	Complement	Speed	Ships in Class			
Class	Displacement	Main Battery	Torpedo Tubes	Complement	Speed	Ship	Keel Laid	Completed or Commissioned	Fate
Umikaze class	1,030 t	2x 120 mm (4.7 in); 5× 12‑pndr.	2x 17.7 in (450 mm)	141	33 kn (61 km/h; 38 mph)	Umikaze	Nov 1909	Sep 1911	Minesweeper W-7, 1930; Retired, 1936
Umikaze class	1,030 t	2x 120 mm (4.7 in); 5× 12‑pndr.	2x 17.7 in (450 mm)	141	33 kn (61 km/h; 38 mph)	Yamakaze	Jun 1910	Oct 1911	Minesweeper W-8, 1930; Retired, 1936
Urakaze class	907 t	1x 120 mm (4.7 in); 4× 12‑pndr.	4x 21 in (530 mm)	120	30 kn (56 km/h; 35 mph)	Urakaze	Oct 1913	Oct 1915	Air attack, Jul 1945
Urakaze class	907 t	1x 120 mm (4.7 in); 4× 12‑pndr.	4x 21 in (530 mm)	120	30 kn (56 km/h; 35 mph)	Kawakaze	Oct 1913	Dec 1916	Transferred to Italy as Audace, Jul 1916
Isokaze class	1,227 t	4x 120 mm (4.7 in)	6x 18 in (460 mm)	128	34 kn (63 km/h; 39 mph)	Isokaze	Apr 1916	Feb 1917	Retired, 1935
Isokaze class	1,227 t	4x 120 mm (4.7 in)	6x 18 in (460 mm)	128	34 kn (63 km/h; 39 mph)	Amatsukaze	Apr 1916	Apr 1917	Retired, 1935
Isokaze class	1,227 t	4x 120 mm (4.7 in)	6x 18 in (460 mm)	128	34 kn (63 km/h; 39 mph)	Hamakaze	Apr 1916	Mar 1917	Retired, 1935
Isokaze class	1,227 t	4x 120 mm (4.7 in)	6x 18 in (460 mm)	128	34 kn (63 km/h; 39 mph)	Tokitsukaze	Dec 1916	Mar 1917	Training ship Haikan No.20, 1940; Wrecked in storm, 1945
Acorn class *	730 t	2x 4 in (100 mm); 2x 12‑pndr.	2x 21 in (530 mm)	72	27 kn (50 km/h; 31 mph)	Kanran (HMS Nemesis)	Nov 1909	Mar 1911	Loaned, 1917; Returned, 1919
Acorn class *	730 t	2x 4 in (100 mm); 2x 12‑pndr.	2x 21 in (530 mm)	72	27 kn (50 km/h; 31 mph)	Sendan (HMS Minstrel)	Mar 1910	May 1911	Loaned, 1917; Returned, 1919
Kawakaze class	1,300 t	3x 120 mm (4.7 in)	6x 21 in (530 mm)	128	37.5 kn (69.5 km/h; 43.2 mph)	Kawakaze	Feb 1917	Nov 1918	Retired, 1934
Kawakaze class	1,300 t	3x 120 mm (4.7 in)	6x 21 in (530 mm)	128	37.5 kn (69.5 km/h; 43.2 mph)	Tanikaze	Sep 1916	Jan 1919	Retired, 1935
* On loan from Royal Navy

==== In commission during World War II ====
Class	Displace- ment	Main Battery	Torpedo Tubes	Comple- ment	Speed	Number Commis- sioned	War Losses				Survived War
Class	Displace- ment	Main Battery	Torpedo Tubes	Comple- ment	Speed	Number Commis- sioned	Air Attack	Sub- marine	Surface Action	Other	Survived War
Minekaze class	1,650 t	4x 120 mm (4.7 in)	6x 21 in (530 mm)	148	39 kn (72 km/h; 45 mph)	15	1	9			5
Kamikaze class	1,720 t	4x 120 mm (4.7 in)	6x 21 in (530 mm)	154	37.25 kn (68.99 km/h; 42.87 mph)	9	2	4		1	2
Mutsuki class	1,445 t	4x 120 mm (4.7 in)	6x 610 mm (24 in)	154	37.25 kn (68.99 km/h; 42.87 mph)	12	9	1	2		none
Fubuki class	2,050 t	6x 127 mm (5.0 in)	9x 610 mm (24 in)	219	38 kn (70 km/h; 44 mph)	20	7	6	4	2	1
Akatsuki class	2,050 t	6x 127 mm (5.0 in)	9x 610 mm (24 in)	233	38 kn (70 km/h; 44 mph)	4		2		1	1
Hatsuharu class	1,802 t	5x 127 mm (5.0 in)	6x 610 mm (24 in)	212	36 kn (67 km/h; 41 mph)	6	4	1		1	none
Shiratsuyu class	1,685 t	5x 127 mm (5.0 in)	8x 610 mm (24 in)	180	34 kn (63 km/h; 39 mph)	10	1	6	2	1	none
Asashio class	2,370 t	6x 127 mm (5.0 in)	8x 610 mm (24 in)	200	35 kn (65 km/h; 40 mph)	10	4	2	4		none
Kagerō class	2,500 t	6x 127 mm (5.0 in)	8x 610 mm (24 in)	239	35.5 kn (65.7 km/h; 40.9 mph)	19	6	4	6	2	1
Yūgumo class	2,520 t	6x 127 mm (5.0 in)	8x 610 mm (24 in)	225	35.5 kn (65.7 km/h; 40.9 mph)	19	9	4	5	1	none
Akizuki class	3,700 t	8x 100 mm (3.9 in)	4x 610 mm (24 in)	263	33 kn (61 km/h; 38 mph)	12	1	1	4		6
Shimakaze	3,300 t	6x 127 mm (5.0 in)	15x 610 mm (24 in)	267	40.9 kn (75.7 km/h; 47.1 mph)	1	1				none
Matsu class	1,530 t	3x 127 mm (5.0 in)	4x 610 mm (24 in)	211	27.8 kn (51.5 km/h; 32.0 mph)	19	2	1	3	1	12
Tachibana class	1,530 t	3x 127 mm (5.0 in)	4x 610 mm (24 in)	211	27.8 kn (51.5 km/h; 32.0 mph)	14	1			1	12
Totals						170	48	41	30	11	40

===== Minekaze-class =====
Minekaze underway near Yokosuka Naval Base, 1932	Minekaze class (15)	
Minekaze underway near Yokosuka Naval Base, 1932	Displacement:	1,650 t
Minekaze underway near Yokosuka Naval Base, 1932	Main battery:	4x 120 mm (4.7 in)
Minekaze underway near Yokosuka Naval Base, 1932	Torpedo tubes:	6x 21 in (530 mm)
Minekaze underway near Yokosuka Naval Base, 1932	Complement:	148
Minekaze underway near Yokosuka Naval Base, 1932	Speed:	39 kn (72 km/h; 45 mph)

Ship	Keel Laid	Completed or Commissioned	Fate	
Ship	Keel Laid	Completed or Commissioned	War Loss	Postwar
Minekaze (Summit Wind)	Apr 1918	May 1920	Submarine off Formosa, Feb 1944	
Sawakaze (Marsh Wind)	Jan 1918	Mar 1920		Scuttled, 1948
Okikaze (Offshore Wind)	Feb 1919	Aug 1920	Submarine near Yokosuka, Jan 1943	
Shimakaze (Island Wind)	Sep 1919	Nov 1920	Submarine near Kavieng, Jan 1943	
Nadakaze (High Seas Wind)	Jan 1920	Sep 1920	Submarine near Lombok Strait, Jul 1945	
Yakaze (Arrow Wind)	Jan 1918	Jul 1920		Scrapped, 1948
Hakaze (Winged Wind)	Nov 1918	Sep 1920	Submarine near Kavieng, Jan 1943	
Shiokaze (Tide Wind)	May 1920	Jul 1921		Scuttled, 1945
Akikaze (Autumn Wind)	Jun 1920	Sep 1921	Submarine west of Luzon, Nov 1944 ‡	
Yūkaze (Evening Wind)	Dec 1920	Aug 1921		To Royal Navy, 1947
Tachikaze (Sword Wind)	Aug 1920	Dec 1921	Air attack at Truk, Feb 1944	
Hokaze (Sail Wind)	Nov 1920	Dec 1921	Submarine in Celebes Sea, Jul 1944	
Nokaze (Field Wind)	Apr 1921	Mar 1922	Submarine in South China Sea, Feb 1945	
Namikaze (Wave Wind)	Nov 1921	Nov 1922		To Rep. of China, 1947
Numakaze (Marsh Wind)	Aug 1921	Jul 1922	Submarine off Okinawa, Dec 1943 ‡	
‡ Lost with all hands

===== Kamikaze-class =====
Kamikaze underway, 1922	Kamikaze class (9)	
Kamikaze underway, 1922	Displacement:	1,720 t
Kamikaze underway, 1922	Main battery:	4x 120 mm (4.7 in)
Kamikaze underway, 1922	Torpedo tubes:	6x 120 mm (4.7 in)
Kamikaze underway, 1922	Complement:	154
Kamikaze underway, 1922	Speed:	37.25 kn (68.99 km/h; 42.87 mph)

Ship	Keel Laid	Completed or Commissioned	Fate	
Ship	Keel Laid	Completed or Commissioned	War Loss	Postwar
Asakaze (Morning Wind)	Feb 1922	Jun 1923	Submarine off Luzon, Aug 1944	
Asanagi (Morning Calm)	Mar 1923	Dec 1924	Submarine south of Honshu, May 1944	
Harukaze (Spring Wind)	May 1922	May 1923		Scuttled, 1947
Hatakaze (Flag Wind)	Jul 1923	Aug 1924	Air attack at Takao, Jan 1945	
Hayate (Gale)	Nov 1922	Dec 1925	Coastal battery at Wake Atoll, Dec 1941*	
Kamikaze (Divine Wind)	Dec 1921	Dec 1922		Scrapped, 1947
Matsukaze (Pine Wind)	Dec 1922	Apr 1924	Submarine south of Honshu, Jun 1944	
Oite (Tail Wind)	Mar 1923	Oct 1925	Air attack at Truk, Feb 1944	
Yūnagi (Evening Calm)	Sep 1923	May 1925	Submarine off Luzon, Aug 1944	
*First Japanese warship lost in Pacific War

===== Mutsuki-class =====
Mutsuki underway	Mutsuki class (12)	
Mutsuki underway	Displacement:	1,445 t
Mutsuki underway	Main battery:	4x 120 mm (4.7 in)
Mutsuki underway	Torpedo tubes:	6x 610 mm (24 in)
Mutsuki underway	Complement:	154
Mutsuki underway	Speed:	37.25 kn (68.99 km/h; 42.87 mph)

Ship	Keel Laid	Completed or Commissioned	War Loss
Fumizuki (July)	Oct 1924	Jul 1926	Air attack at Truk, Feb 1944
Kikuzuki (Chrysanthemum Moon)	Jun 1925	Nov 1926	Air attack at Tulagi, May 1942
Kisaragi (February)	Jun 1924	Dec 1925	Air attack at Wake Atoll, Dec 1941*‡
Mikazuki (Crescent Moon)	Aug 1925	May 1927	Air attack at Tuluvu, Jul 1943
Minazuki (June)	Mar 1925	Mar 1927	Submarine off Tawitawi, Jun 1944
Mochizuki (Full Moon)	Mar 1926	Oct 1927	Air attack off Rabaul, Oct 1943
Mutsuki (January)	May 1924	Mar 1926	Battle of the Eastern Solomons, Aug 1942
Nagatsuki (September)	Apr 1926	Apr 1927	Battle of Kula Gulf, Jul 1943
Satsuki (May)	Dec 1924	Nov 1925	Air attack on Manila Bay, Sep 1944
Uzuki (April)	Jan 1924	Sep 1926	PT boat attack off Cebu, Dec 1944
Yayoi (March)	Jan 1924	Aug 1926	Air attack off New Guinea, Sep 1942
Yūzuki (Evening Moon)	Nov 1926	Jul 1927	Air attack off Cebu, Dec 1944
* Second Japanese warship lost in Pacific War
‡ Lost with all hands

===== Fubuki-class =====
Fubuki	Fubuki class (20)	
Fubuki	Displacement:	2,050 t
Fubuki	Main battery:	6x 127 mm (5.0 in)
Fubuki	Torpedo tubes:	18x 610 mm (24 in)
Fubuki	Complement:	219
Fubuki	Speed:	38 kn (70 km/h; 44 mph)

Ship	Keel Laid	Completed or Commissioned	Fate		
Ship	Keel Laid	Completed or Commissioned	Prewar	War Loss	Postwar
Akebono (Daybreak)	Nov 1929	Jul 1931		Air attack near Manila, Nov 1944	
Amagiri (Fogged or Clouded Sky)	Nov 1928	Nov 1930		Struck mine in Makassar Strait, Apr 1944	
Asagiri (Morning Fog)	Dec 1928	Jun 1930		Battle of the Eastern Solomons, Aug 1942	
Ayanami (Twilled Waves)	Jan 1928	Apr 1930		Naval Battle of Guadalcanal, Nov 1942	
Fubuki (Blizzard)	Jun 1926	Aug 1928		Battle of Cape Esperance, Oct 1942	
Hatsuyuki (First Snow)	Apr 1927	Mar 1929		Air attack near Shortlands, Jul 1943	
Isonami (Breakers or Surf)	Oct 1926	Jun 1928		Submarine in Sulu Sea, Apr 1943	
Miyuki (Deep Snow)	Apr 1927	Jun 1929	Collision in Korea Strait, Jun 1934*		
Murakumo (Massed Clouds)	Apr 1927	May 1929		Battle of Cape Esperance, Oct 1942	
Oboro (Moonlight)	Oct 1929	Nov 1931		Air attack in Aleutians, Oct 1942	
Sagiri (Haze)	Mar 1929	Jan 1931		Submarine near Borneo, Dec 1941	
Sazanami (Ripples)	Mar 1930	Jun 1931		Submarine near Caroline Islands, Jan 1944	
Shikinami (Spreading Waves)	Jul 1928	Dec 1929		Submarine in South China Sea, Sep 1944	
Shinonome (Daybreak)	Oct 1924	Jul 1926		Air attack near British Borneo, Dec 1941	
Shirakumo (White Cloud)	Oct 1924	Jul 1926		Submarine off Hokkaidō, Mar 1944	
Shirayuki (White Snow)	Mar 1927	Dec 1928		Battle of the Bismarck Sea, Mar 1943	
Uranami (Shore Wave)	Oct 1924	Jul 1926		Air attack off Panay, Oct 1944	
Ushio (Tide)	Oct 1924	Jul 1926			Scrapped, 1948
Usugumo (Thin Clouds)	Oct 1924	Jul 1926		Submarine in Sea of Okhotsk, Jul 1944	
Yūgiri (Evening Mist)	Oct 1924	Jul 1926		Battle of Cape St. George, Nov 1943	
* Only Japanese modern destroyer loss prewar; only Japanese modern destroyer loss to collision

===== Akatsuki-class =====
Ikazuchi in Chinese waters, 1938	Akatsuki class (4)	
Ikazuchi in Chinese waters, 1938	Displacement:	2,050 t
Ikazuchi in Chinese waters, 1938	Main battery:	6x 127 mm (5.0 in)
Ikazuchi in Chinese waters, 1938	Torpedo tubes:	9x 610 mm (24 in)
Ikazuchi in Chinese waters, 1938	Complement:	233
Ikazuchi in Chinese waters, 1938	Speed:	38 kn (70 km/h; 44 mph)

Ship	Keel Laid	Completed or Commissioned	Fate	
Ship	Keel Laid	Completed or Commissioned	War Loss	Postwar
Akatsuki (Dawn)	Feb 1930	Nov 1932	Naval Battle of Guadalcanal, Nov 1942	
Hibiki (Echo)	Feb 1930	Mar 1933		To USSR, 1949
Ikazuchi (Thunder)	Mar 1930	Aug 1932	Submarine off Guam, Jul 1944 ‡	
Inazuma (Lightning)	Mar 1930	Nov 1932	Submarine off Tawitawi, May 1944	
‡ Lost with all hands

===== Hatsuharu-class =====
Hatsuharu	Hatsuharu class (6)	
Hatsuharu	Displacement:	1,802 t
Hatsuharu	Main battery:	5x 127 mm (5.0 in)
Hatsuharu	Torpedo tubes:	6x 610 mm (24 in)
Hatsuharu	Complement:	212
Hatsuharu	Speed:	36 kn (67 km/h; 41 mph)

Ship	Keel Laid	Completed or Commissioned	War Loss
Ariake (Daybreak)	Jan 1933	Mar 1935	Air attack near Tuluvu, Jul 1943
Hatsuharu (Early Spring)	May 1931	Sep 1933	Air attack on Manila Bay, Nov 1944
Hatsushimo (First Frost)	Jan 1933	Sep 1934	Mined and beached in Miyazu Bay, Jul 1945
Nenohi (New Year Day)	Dec 1931	Sep 1933	Submarine in Aleutians, Jul 1942
Wakaba (Young Leaves)	Dec 1931	Oct 1934	Air attack off Panay, Oct 1944
Yūgure (Twilight)	Apr 1933	Mar 1935	Air attack off Kolombangara, Jul 1943 †
† Survivors rescued but subsequently lost

===== Shiratsuyu-class =====
Harusame underway, 1943	Shiratsuyu class (10)	
Harusame underway, 1943	Displacement:	1,685 t
Harusame underway, 1943	Main battery:	5x 127 mm (5.0 in)
Harusame underway, 1943	Torpedo tubes:	8x 610 mm (24 in)
Harusame underway, 1943	Complement:	180
Harusame underway, 1943	Speed:	34 kn (63 km/h; 39 mph)

Ship	Keel Laid	Completed or Commissioned	War Loss
Harusame (Spring Rain)	Feb 1935	Aug 1937	Air attack near New Guinea, Jun 1944
Kawakaze (River Wind)	Apr 1935	Apr 1937	Battle of Vella Gulf, Aug 1943
Murasame (Passing Shower)	Feb 1934	Jan 1937	Submarine in Blackett Strait, Mar 1943
Samidare (Early Summer Rain)	Dec 1934	Jan 1937	Submarine near Palau, Aug 1944
Shigure (Drizzle)	Dec 1933	Sep 1936	Submarine in Gulf of Siam, Jan 1945
Shiratsuyu (White Dew)	Nov 1933	Sep 1936	Collision near Surigao Strait, Jun 1944
Suzukaze (Cool Breeze)	Jul 1935	Aug 1937	Submarine off Ponape, Jan 1944
Umikaze (Sea Breeze)	May 1935	May 1937	Submarine at Truk, Feb 1944
Yamakaze (Mountain Wind)	May 1935	Jun 1937	Submarine off Honshu, Jun 1942 ‡
Yūdachi (Evening Squall)	Oct 1934	Jan 1937	Naval Battle of Guadalcanal, Nov 1942
‡ Lost with all hands

===== Asashio-class =====
Asashio	Asashio class (10)	
Asashio	Displacement:	2,370 t
Asashio	Main battery:	6x 127 mm (5.0 in)
Asashio	Torpedo tubes:	8x 610 mm (24 in)
Asashio	Complement:	200
Asashio	Speed:	35 kn (65 km/h; 40 mph)

Ship	Keel Laid	Completed or Commissioned	War Loss
Arare (Hailstone)	Mar 1937	Apr 1939	Submarine in Aleutians, Jul 1942
Arashio (Stormy Tide)	Oct 1935	Dec 1937	Battle of the Bismarck Sea, Mar 1943
Asagumo (Morning Cloud)	Dec 1936	Mar 1938	Battle of Surigao Strait, Oct 1944
Asashio (Morning Tide)	Sep 1935	Aug 1937	Battle of the Bismarck Sea, Mar 1943
Kasumi (Haze)	Dec 1936	Jun 1939	Air attack off Okinawa, Apr 1945
Michishio (Full Tide)	Nov 1935	Oct 1937	Battle of Surigao Strait, Oct 1944
Minegumo (Summit Cloud)	Mar 1937	Apr 1938	Battle of Blackett Strait, Mar 1943
Natsugumo (Summer Cloud)	Jul 1936	Feb 1938	Air attack off Guadalcanal, Oct 1942
Ōshio (High Tide)	Aug 1936	Oct 1936	Submarine off Manus, Feb 1943
Yamagumo (Mountain Cloud)	Nov 1936	Jan 1938	Battle of Surigao Strait, Oct 1944

===== Kagerō-class =====
Yukikaze underway, 1939	Kagerō class (19)	
Yukikaze underway, 1939	Displacement:	2,500 t
Yukikaze underway, 1939	Main battery:	6x 127 mm (5.0 in)
Yukikaze underway, 1939	Torpedo tubes:	8x 610 mm (24 in)
Yukikaze underway, 1939	Complement:	239
Yukikaze underway, 1939	Speed:	35.5 kn (65.7 km/h; 40.9 mph)

Ship	Keel Laid	Completed or Commissioned	Fate	
Ship	Keel Laid	Completed or Commissioned	War Loss	Postwar
Akigumo (Autumn Clouds)	Jul 1940	Sep 1941	Submarine off Zamboanga Peninsula, Apr 1944	
Amatsukaze (Heavenly Wind)	Feb 1939	Oct 1940	Scuttled off Amoy, Apr 1945	
Arashi (Storm)		Nov 1940	Battle of Vella Gulf, Aug 1943	
Hagikaze (Clover Wind)		Jun 1940	Battle of Vella Gulf, Aug 1943	
Hamakaze (Beach Wind)	Nov 1939	Jun 1941	Air attack in East China Sea, Apr 1945	
Hatsukaze (First Wind)	Dec 1937	Feb 1940	Battle of Empress Augusta Bay, Nov 1943	
Hayashio (Swift Tide)	Jun 1938	Aug 1940	Air attack in Huon Gulf, Nov 1942	
Isokaze (Wind on the Beach)	Nov 1938	Nov 1940	Air attack off Okinawa, Apr 1945	
Kagerō (Mirage)	Sep 1937	Nov 1939	Air attack off Rendova, May 1943	
Kuroshio (Black Tide)	Aug 1937	Jan 1940	Struck mine off Kolombangara, May 1943	
Maikaze (Dancing Wind)	Apr 1940	Jul 1941	Surface action near Truk, Feb 1944	
Natsushio (Summer Tide)	Dec 1937	Aug 1940	Submarine off Makassar, Feb 1942	
Nowaki (Autumn Gale)	Nov 1939	Apr 1941	Surface action off Samar, Oct 1944	
Oyashio (Father Current)	Mar 1938	Aug 1940	Air attack off Kolombangara, May 1943	
Shiranui (Phosphorescent Light)	Aug 1937	Dec 1939	Air attack off Panay, Oct 1944	
Tanikaze (Valley Wind)		Apr 1941	Submarine near TawiTawi, Jun 1944	
Tokitsukaze (Favorable Wind)	Feb 1939	Dec 1940	Battle of the Bismarck Sea, Mar 1943	
Urakaze (Wind on the Sea)	Apr 1939	Dec 1940	Submarine off Formosa, Nov 1944	
Yukikaze (Snowy Wind)		Jan 1940		To Rep. of China, Jul 1947

===== Yūgumo-class =====
Naganami at anchor	Yugumo class (19)	
Naganami at anchor	Displacement:	2,520 t
Naganami at anchor	Main battery:	6x 127 mm (5.0 in)
Naganami at anchor	Torpedo tubes:	8x 610 mm (24 in)
Naganami at anchor	Complement:	225
Naganami at anchor	Speed:	35.5 kn (65.7 km/h; 40.9 mph)

Ship	Keel Laid	Commis- sioned	War Loss
Akishimo (Autumn Frost)	May 1943	Mar 1944	Air attack at Cavite, Nov 1944
Asashimo (Morning Frost)	Jan 1943	Nov 1943	Air attack off Okinawa, Apr 1945
Fujinami (Purple Wave)	Aug 1942	Jul 1943	Air attack following Battle off Samar, Oct 1944 †
Hamanami (Beach Waves)	Apr 1943	Oct 1943	Air attack off Leyte, Nov 1944
Hayanami (Early Waves)	Jan 1942	Jul 1943	Submarine near TawiTawi, Jun 1944
Hayashimo (Early Frost)	Jan 1943	Feb 1944	Grounded and abandoned following Battle off Samar, Oct 1944
Kazagumo (Wind and Clouds)	Dec 1940	Mar 1942	Submarine near Davao Gulf, Jun 1944
Kishinami (Shore Waves)	Aug 1943	Dec 1943	Submarine near Palawan, Dec 1944
Kiyonami (Clear Wave)	Oct 1941	Jan 1943	Air attack off Kolombangara, Jul 1943 ↔
Kiyoshimo (Clear Frost)	Feb 1944	May 1944	Air attack and PT boat off Mindoro, Dec 1944
Makigumo (Cirrus Clouds)	Dec 1940	Mar 1942	Scuttled after striking mine off Savo Island, Feb 1943
Makinami (Overflowing Waves)	Apr 1941	Aug 1942	Battle of Cape St. George, Nov 1943
Naganami (Long Waves)	Apr 1941	Jun 1942	Air attack Ormoc Bay, Nov 1944
Okinami (High Seas Waves)	Aug 1942	Dec 1943	Air attack Manila Bay, Nov 1944
Ōnami (Big Rough Waves)	Nov 1941	Dec 1942	Battle of Cape St. George, Nov 1943 ‡
Suzunami (Breaking Waves)	Mar 1942	Jul 1943	Air attack Rabaul, Nov 1943
Takanami (Tall Wave)	May 1941	Aug 1942	Battle of Tassafaronga, Nov 1942
Tamanami (Jade Wave)	Mar 1942	Apr 1943	Submarine off Manila Bay, Jun 1944 ‡
Yūgumo (Evening Clouds)	Jul 1940	Dec 1941	Battle of Vella Lavella, Oct 1943
‡ Lost with all hands
† Lost with all hands, including survivors of Chokai
↔ Very few survivors; all previously rescued from Yugumo lost

===== Akizuki-class =====
Akizuki underway	Akizuki class (12)	
Akizuki underway	Displacement:	2,700 t
Akizuki underway	Main battery:	8x 100 mm (3.9 in)
Akizuki underway	Torpedo tubes:	4x 610 mm (24 in)
Akizuki underway	Complement:	263
Akizuki underway	Speed:	33 kn (61 km/h; 38 mph)

Ship	Keel Laid	Commis- sioned	War Loss	Postwar
Akizuki (Autumn Moon)	Jul 1940	Jun 1942	Battle off Cape Engaño, Oct 1944	
Fuyutsuki (Winter Moon)	May 1943	May 1944		Converted to breakwater, May 1948
Hanazuki (Flower Moon)	Feb 1944	Dec 1944		Sunk as target, Feb 1948
Harutsuki (Spring Moon)	Dec 1943	Dec 1944		To Soviet Navy, Aug 1947
Hatsuzuki (New Moon in Autumn)	Jul 1941	Dec 1942	Battle off Cape Engaño, Oct 1944	
Michitsuki	--	--		
Natsuzuki (Summer Moon)	May 1944	Apr 1945		To Royal Navy, Aug 1947
Niizuki (New Moon)	Dec 1941	Mar 1943	Battle of Kula Gulf, Jul 1943	
Shimotsuki (November)	Jul 1942	Mar 1944	Submarine off Singapore, Nov 1944	
Suzutsuki (Clear Moon in Autumn)	Mar 1941	Dec 1942		Converted to breakwater, May 1948
Teruzuki (Shining Moon)	Nov 1941	Jan 1943	Surface action off Savo Island, Dec 1942	
Wakatsuki (Young Moon)	Mar 1942	May 1943	Air attack off Ormoc Bay, Nov 1944	
Yoizuki (Evening Moon)	Aug 1943	Jan 1942		To Rep. of China, Aug 1947

===== Shimakaze =====
Shimakaze underway	Shimakaze (1)	
Shimakaze underway	Displacement:	3,300 t
Shimakaze underway	Main battery:	6x 127 mm (5.0 in)
Shimakaze underway	Torpedo tubes:	15x 610 mm (24 in)
Shimakaze underway	Complement:	267
Shimakaze underway	Speed:	40.9 kn (75.7 km/h; 47.1 mph)

Ship	Keel Laid	Completed or Commissioned	War Loss
Shimakaze (Island Wind)	Aug 1941	May 1943	Battle of Ormoc Bay, Nov 1944

===== Matsu-class =====
Momi at anchor	Matsu class (19)	
Momi at anchor	Displacement:	1,530 t
Momi at anchor	Main battery:	3x 127 mm (5.0 in)
Momi at anchor	Torpedo tubes:	4x 610 mm (24 in)
Momi at anchor	Complement:	211
Momi at anchor	Speed:	27.8 kn (51.5 km/h; 32.0 mph)

Ship	Keel Laid	Commis- sioned	War Loss	Postwar
Hinoki (Japanese Cypress)	Mar 1944	Sep 1944	Surface action off Manila Bay, Jan 1945 ‡	
Kaede (Maple)	Mar 1944	Oct 1944		To Rep. of China, Jul 1947
Kashi (Live Oak)	May 1944	Sep 1944		Scrapped; 1947
Kaya (Japanese Nutmeg-Yew)	Apr 1944	Sep 1944		To USSR, Jul 1947
Keyaki (Japanese Elm)	Jun 1944	Dec 1944		Sunk as target, 1947
Kiri (Paulownia Hardwood)	Feb 1944	Aug 1944		To USSR, Jul 1947
Kuwa (Mulberry)	Dec 1943	Jul 1944	Surface action off Ormoc Bay, Dec 1944	
Maki (Podocarp Hardwood)	Feb 1944	Aug 1944		Scrapped; 1947
Matsu (Pine Tree)	Aug 1943	Apr 1944	Air attack off Bonin Islands, Aug 1944	
Momi (White Fir)	Jan 1944	Sep 1944	Air attack off Manila Bay, Jan 1945	
Momo (Peach)	Nov 1943	Jun 1944	Submarine off Cape Bolinao, Luzon, Dec 1944	
Nara (Oak)	Jun 1944	Nov 1944		Scrapped, 1948
Sakura (Cherry Blossom)	Jun 1944	Nov 1944	Struck mine off Osaka, Jul 1945	
Sugi (Cedar)	Feb 1944	Aug 1944		To Rep. of China, Jul 1947
Sumire (Violet)	Oct 1944	Mar 1945		Sunk as target, 1947
Take (Bamboo)	Oct 1943	Jun 1944		Sunk as target, 1947
Tsubaki (Camellia)	Jun 1944	Nov 1944		Scrapped, Jul 1948
Ume (Apricot)	Jan 1944	Jun 1944	Air attack off Ormoc Bay, Jan 1945	
Yanagi (Willow)	Aug 1944	Jan 1945		Scrapped, Apr 1947
‡ Lost with all hands

===== Tachibana-class =====
Nire	Tachibana class (14)	
Nire	Displacement:	1,530 t
Nire	Main battery:	3x 127 mm (5.0 in)
Nire	Torpedo tubes:	4x 610 mm (24 in)
Nire	Complement:	211
Nire	Speed:	27.8 kn (51.5 km/h; 32.0 mph)

Ship	Keel Laid	Commis- sioned	War Loss	Postwar
Enoki (Nettle Tree)	Oct 1944	Mar 1945	Struck mine Jun 1945, scrapped	
Hagi (Bush Clover)	Sep 1944	Mar 1945		To Royal Navy, Apr 1947
Hatsuume (Early-blooming Plum)	Dec 1944	Jun 1945		To Rep. of China, Jul 1947
Hatsuzakura (Early-blooming Cherry)	Apr 1944	May 1945		To USSR, Jul 1947
Kaba (Birch)	Oct 1944	May 1945		To US, Aug 1947
Kaki (Persimmon)	Oct 1944	May 1945		To US, Jul 1947
Kusunoki (Camphor)	Nov 1944	May 1945		To Royal Navy, Jul 1947
Nashi (?)	Sep 1944	Mar 1945		Salvaged 1955 as JDS Wakaba
Nire (Elm)	Aug 1944	Jan 1945		Scrapped, Apr 1948
Odake (Great Bamboo)	Nov 1944	May 1945		To US, Jul 1945
Shii (Castanopsis)	Sep 1944	Mar 1945		To USSR, Jul 1945
Sumire (Violet)	Oct 1944	Mar 1945		To Royal Navy, Aug 1947
Tachibana (?)	Jul 1944	Jan 1945	Sunk by air attack, Jul 1945	
Tsuta (Ivy)	Jul 1944	Feb 1945		To Rep. of China, Jul 1947

=== 2nd Class destroyers ===
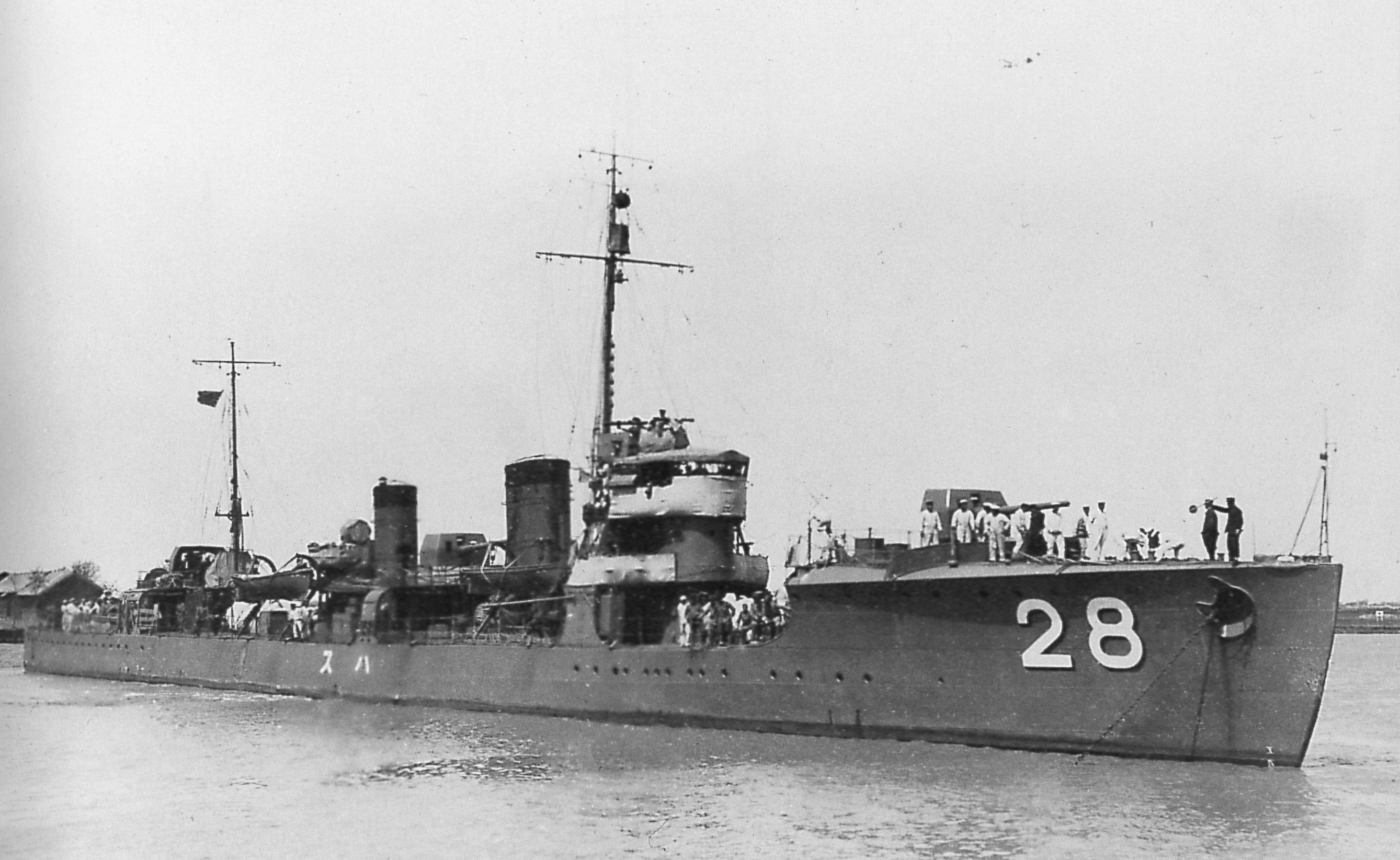
Hasu in 1919

- Sakura class (1911–1912)
  - Sakura, Tachibana
- Kaba class (1915)
  - Kaba, Kashiwa, Sakaki, Katsura, Sugi, Kaede, Ume, Kiri, Kusunoki, Matsu
- Momo class (1916–1917)
  - Momo, Kashi, Hinoki, Yanagi
- Enoki class (1917–1918)
  - Enoki, Maki, Nara, Keyaki, Kuwa, Tsubaki
- Momi class (1919–1922)
  - Momi, Kaya, Nire, Kuri, Nashi, Take, Kaki, Tsuga, Kiku, Aoi, Hagi, Susuki, Fuji, Tsuta, Ashi, Hishi, Hasu, Sumire, Yomogi, Warabi, Tade
- Wakatake class (1922–1923)
  - Wakatake, Kuretake, Sanae, Sawarabi, Asagao, Yūgao, Fuyo, Karukaya

=== 3rd Class destroyers ===
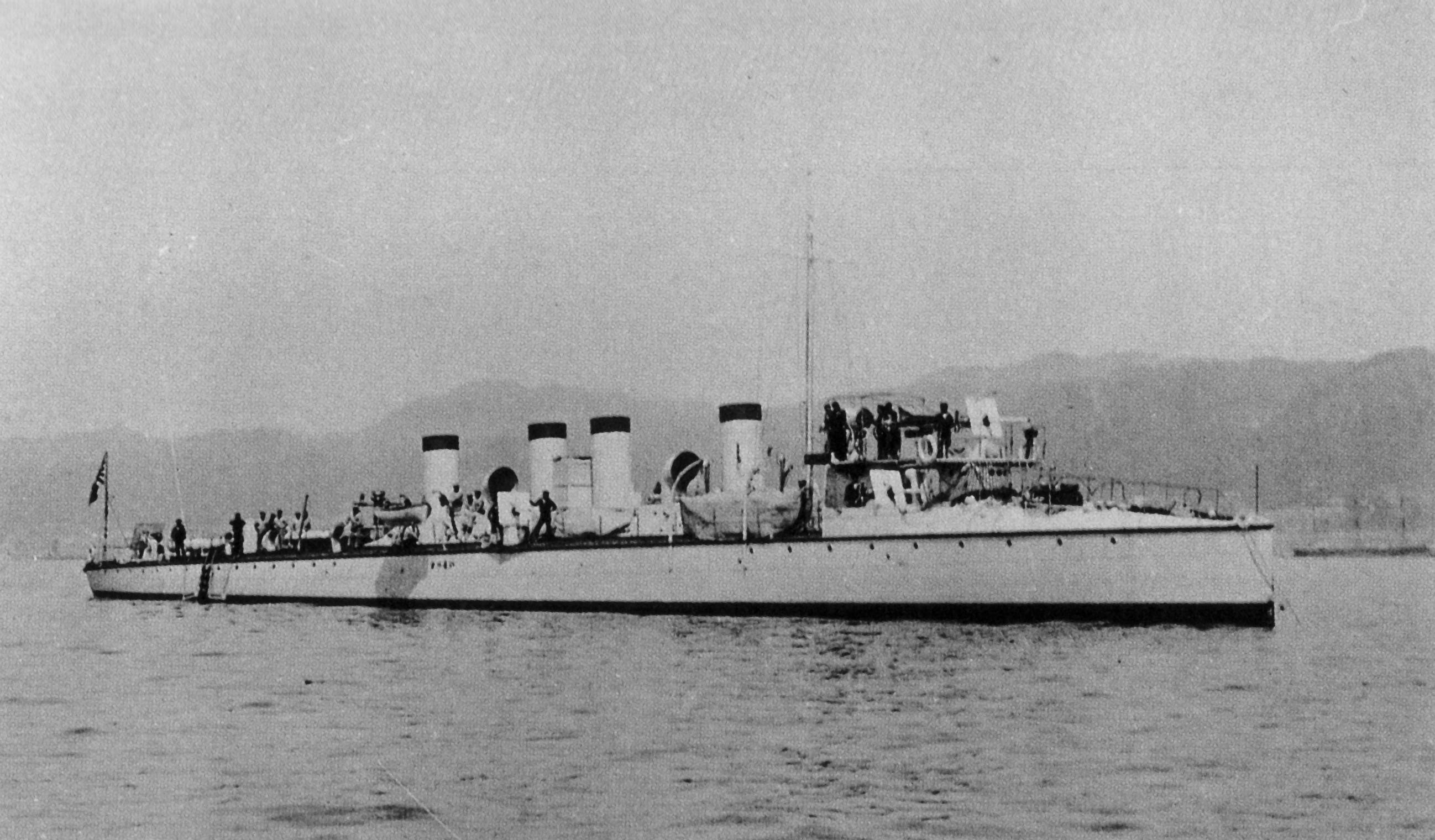
Inazuma circa 1900

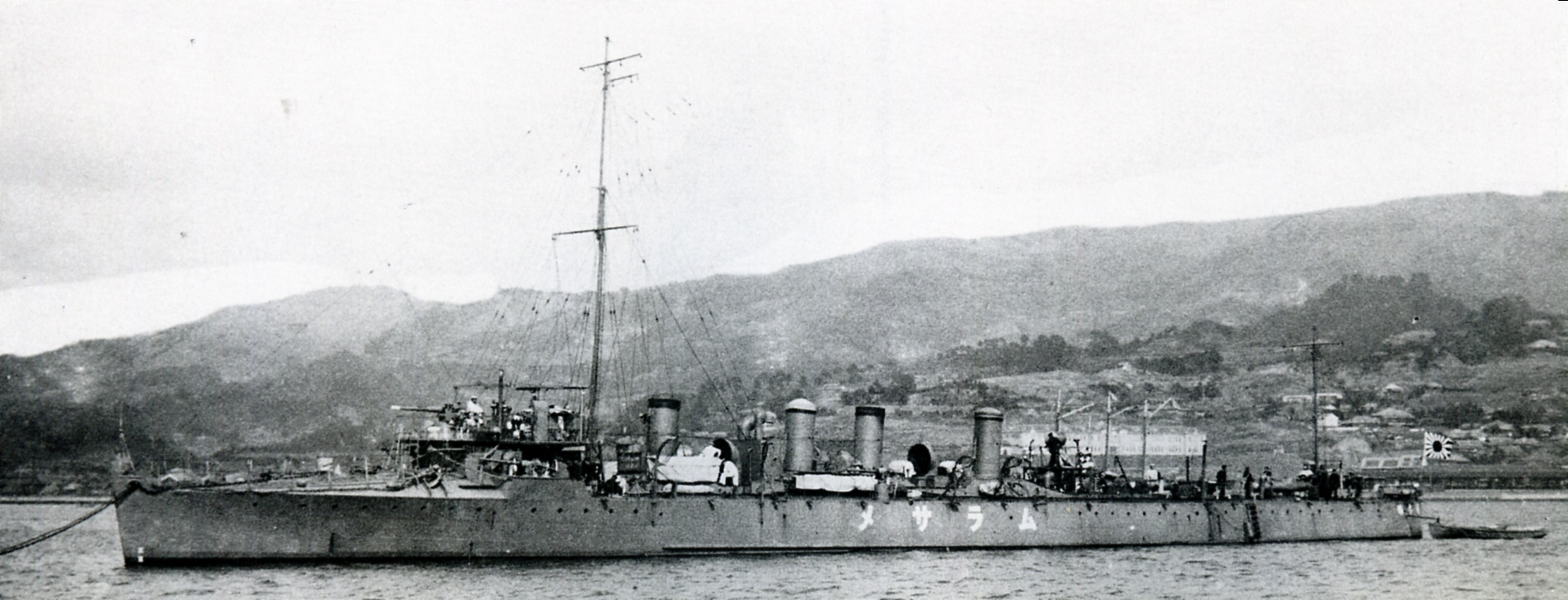
Murasame in 1929

- Ikazuchi class (1898–1899)
  - Ikazuchi, Inazuma, Akebono, Sazanami, Niji, Oboro
- Murakumo class (1898–1900)
  - Murakumo, Shinonome, Yūgiri, Shiranui, Kagerō, Usugumo
- Akatsuki class (1901–1902)
  - Akatsuki, Kasumi
- Shirakumo class (1901–1902)
  - Shirakumo, Asashio
- Harusame class (1902–1905)
  - Harusame, Murasame, Hayatori, Asagiri, Ariake, Fubuki, Arare
- Kamikaze class (1905–1909)
  - Kamikaze, Hatsushimo, Yayoi, Kisaragi, Asakaze, Shiratsuyu, Shirayuki, Matsukaze, Harukaze, Shigure, Asatsuyu, Hayate, Oite, Yūnagi, Yūgure, Yūdachi, Mikazuki, Nowaki, Ushio, Nenohi, Hibiki, Shirotae, Hatsuharu, Wakaba, Hatsuyuki, Uzuki, Minatsuki, Nagatsuki, Kikutsuki, Uranami, Isonami, Ayanami
- Russian destroyers captured during the Russo-Japanese War (1905)
  - Satsuki (ex-Bedovyi) (ru:Бедовый (миноносец)), Yamabiko (ex-Reshitel'nyi), Fumizuki (ex-Sil'nyi) (ru:Сильный (миноносец))

=== Kaibōkan ===
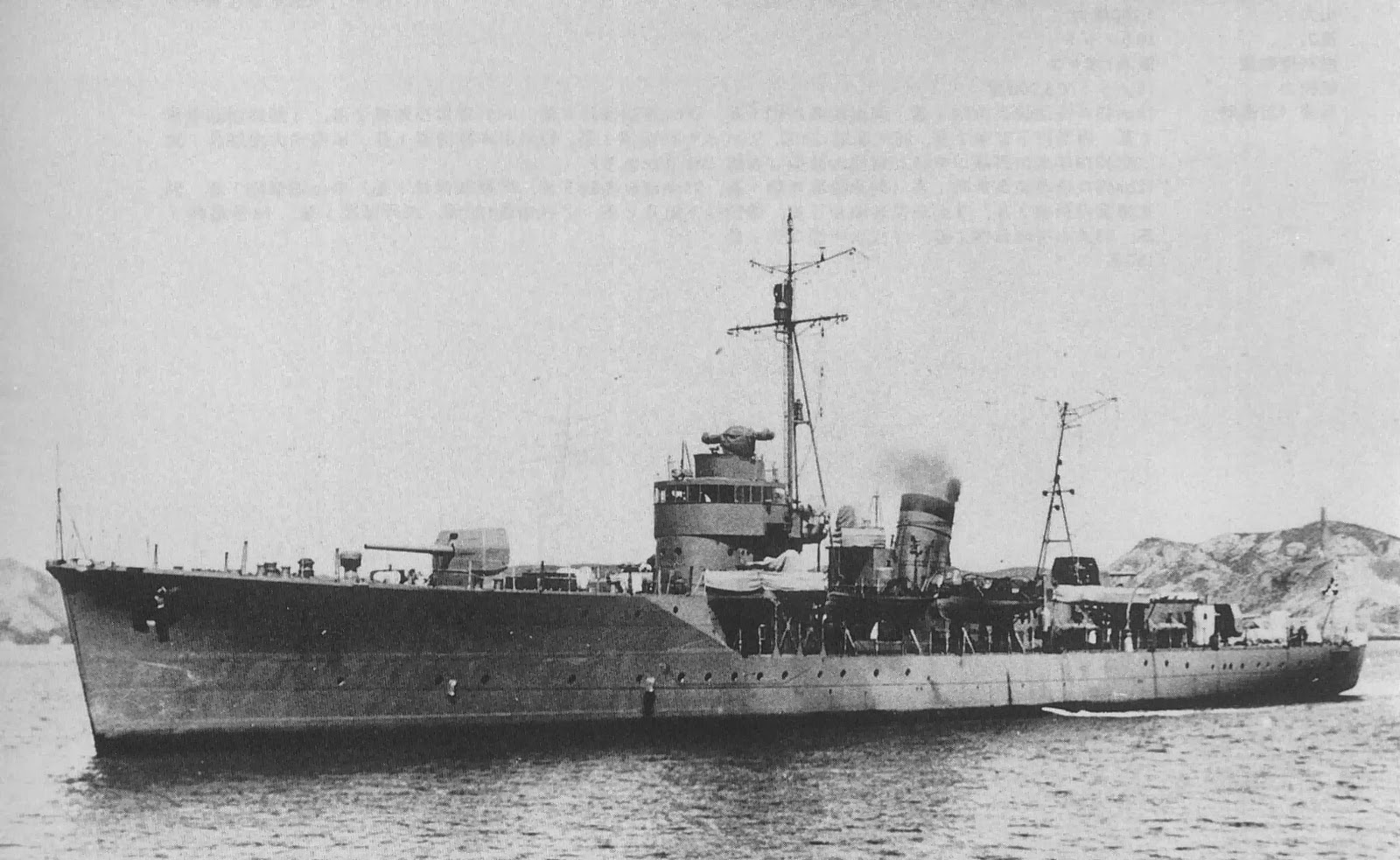
Matsuwa in 1943

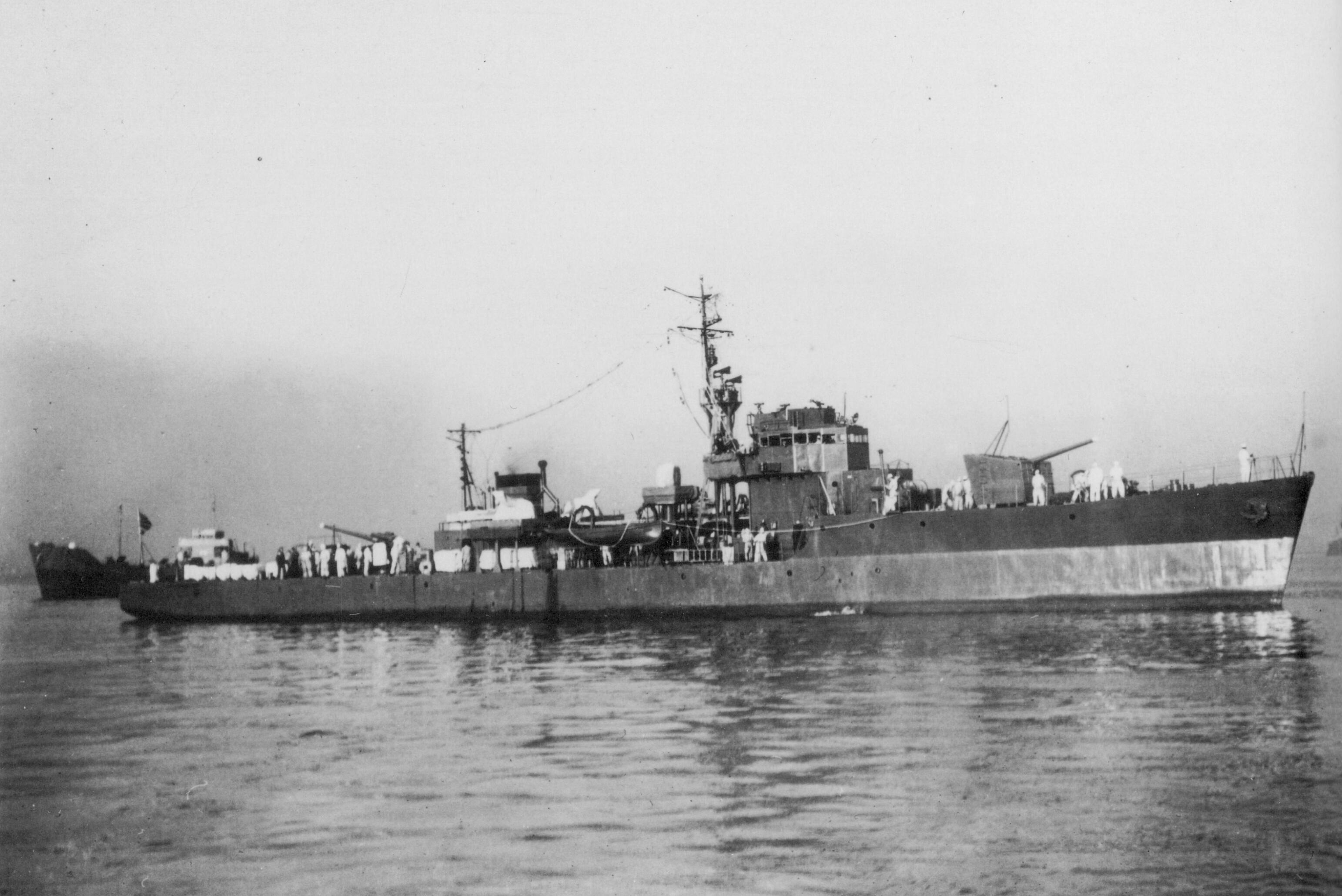
Escort ship CD-1 in 1944

Kaibōkan was originally a catchall term used by the Imperial Japanese Navy for obsolete warships which had been relegated to coastal defense duties. As a consequence of the London Naval Treaty, the Imperial Japanese Navy was constricted on the total tonnage of destroyers it was allowed to build, so Japanese naval planners designed a new class of vessel to take advantage of a loophole in the treaty which permitted ships of between 600 and 2,000 tons, with no more than four guns over 76 mm (3.0 in), no torpedoes, and a maximum speed of 20 knots, and gave them the obsolete designation of kaibōkan to further ensure that they would not be considered as destroyers. These ships were roughly equivalent to contemporary Allied destroyer escorts and frigates.

- Shimushu class (1939-1940)
  - Shimushu, Kunashiri, Ishigaki, Hachijo
- Etorofu class (1942-1943)
  - Etorofu, Matsuwa, Sado, Oki, Mutsure, Iki, Tsushima, Wakamiya, Hirado, Fukae, Amakusa, Manju, Kanju, Kasado
- Mikura class (1943-1944)
  - Mikura, Miyake, Awaji, Nōmi, Kurahashi, Yashiro, Chiburi, Kusagaki
- Ukuru class (1944-1945)
  - Ukuru, Okinawa, Amami, Aguni, Shinnan, Inagi, Habushi, Ojika, Kanawa, Uku, Takane, Kuga, Shiga, Iwō, Yaku, Chikubu, Kōzu, Hodaka, Ikara, Ikuno (Ōtsu, Tomoshiri not completed)
- Hiburi class (1944-1945)
  - Hiburi, Daitō, Shōnan, Kume, Ikuna, Shisaka, Sakito, Mokuto, Habuto (Murotsu, Urumi not completed)
- Type C (1943-1945)
  - CD-1, CD-3, CD-5, CD-7, CD-9, CD-11, CD-13, CD-15, CD-17, CD-19, CD-21, CD-23, CD-25, CD-27, CD-29, CD-31, CD-33, CD-35, CD-37, CD-39, CD-41, CD-43, CD-45, CD-47, CD-49, CD-51, CD-53, CD-55, CD-57, CD-59, CD-61, CD-63, CD-65, CD-67, CD-69, CD-71, CD-73, CD-75, CD-77, CD-79, CD-81, CD-85, CD-87, CD-95, CD-97, CD-105, CD-107, CD-205, CD-207, CD-213, CD-215, CD-217, CD-219, CD-221, CD-225, CD-227 (CD-83, CD-89, CD-93, CD-101, CD-109, CD-117, CD-223, CD-229, CD-235 not completed)
- Type D (1943-1945)
  - CD-2, CD-4, CD-6, CD-8, CD-10, CD-12, CD-14, CD-16, CD-18, CD-20, CD-22, CD-24, CD-26, CD-28, CD-30, CD-32, CD-34, CD-36, CD-38, CD-40, CD-42, CD-44, CD-46, CD-48, CD-50, CD-52, CD-54, CD-56, CD-58, CD-60, CD-64, CD-66, CD-68, CD-72, CD-74, CD-76, CD-78, CD-82, CD-84, CD-102, CD-104, CD-106, CD-112, CD-116, CD-118, CD-124, CD-126, CD-130, CD-132, CD-134, CD-138, CD-142, CD-144, CD-150, CD-154, CD-156, CD-158, CD-160, CD-186, CD-190, CD-192, CD-194, CD-196, CD-198, CD-200, CD-202, CD-204 (CD-62, CD-70, CD-80, CD-122 not completed)
- Chinese cruisers captured during the Second Sino-Japanese War (1944)
  - Ioshima (ex-Ning Hai), Yasoshima (ex-Ping Hai)

== Torpedo boats ==
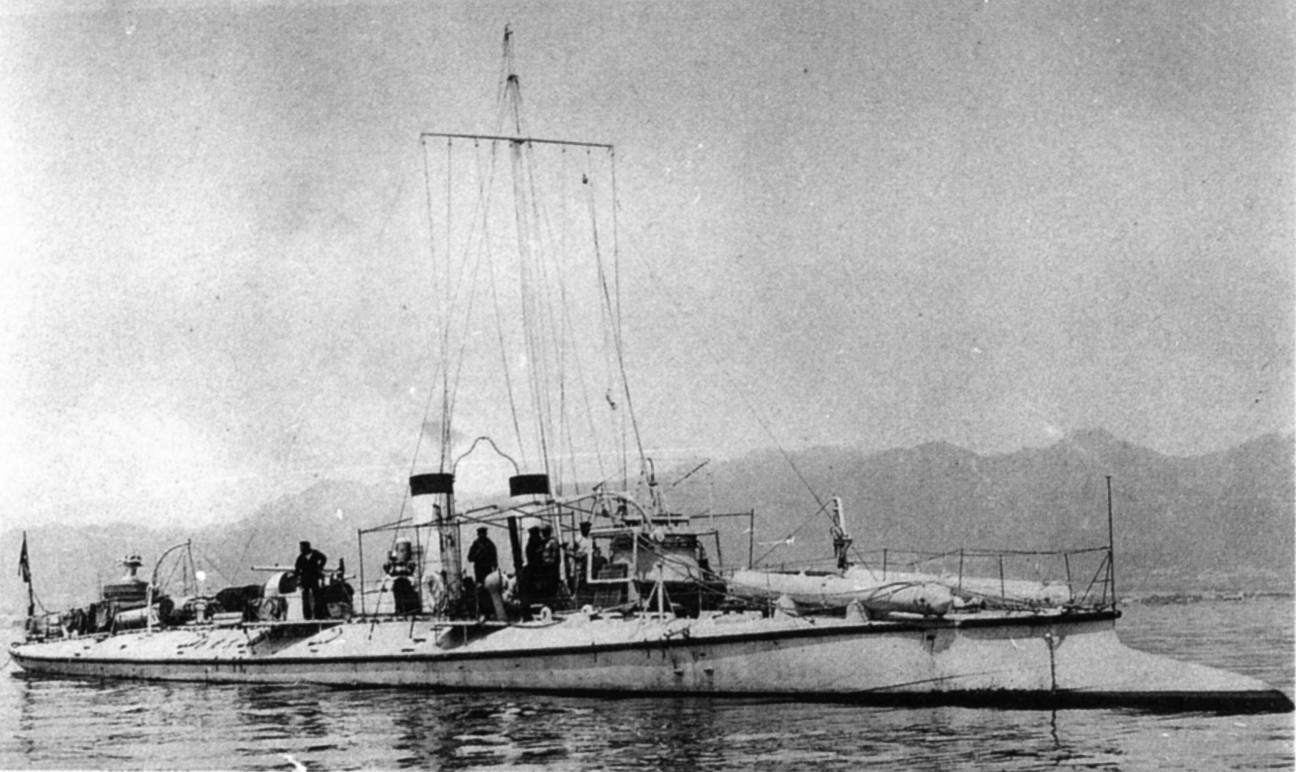
Kotaka circa 1898-1901

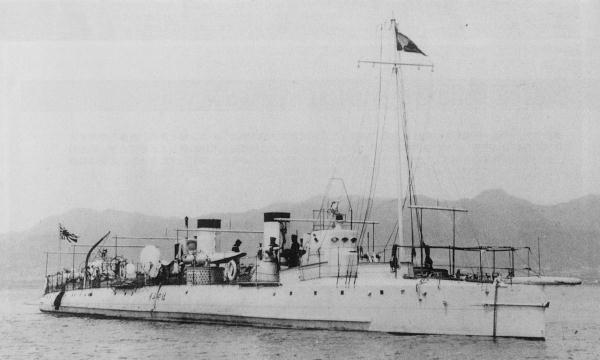
Hayabusa in 1900

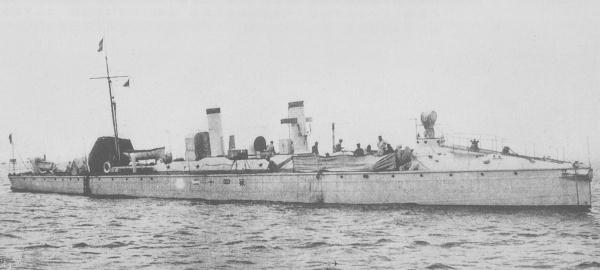
Torpedo boat No.42 circa 1902

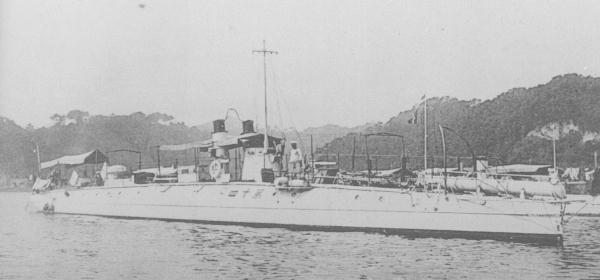
Torpedo boat No.14 circa 1900

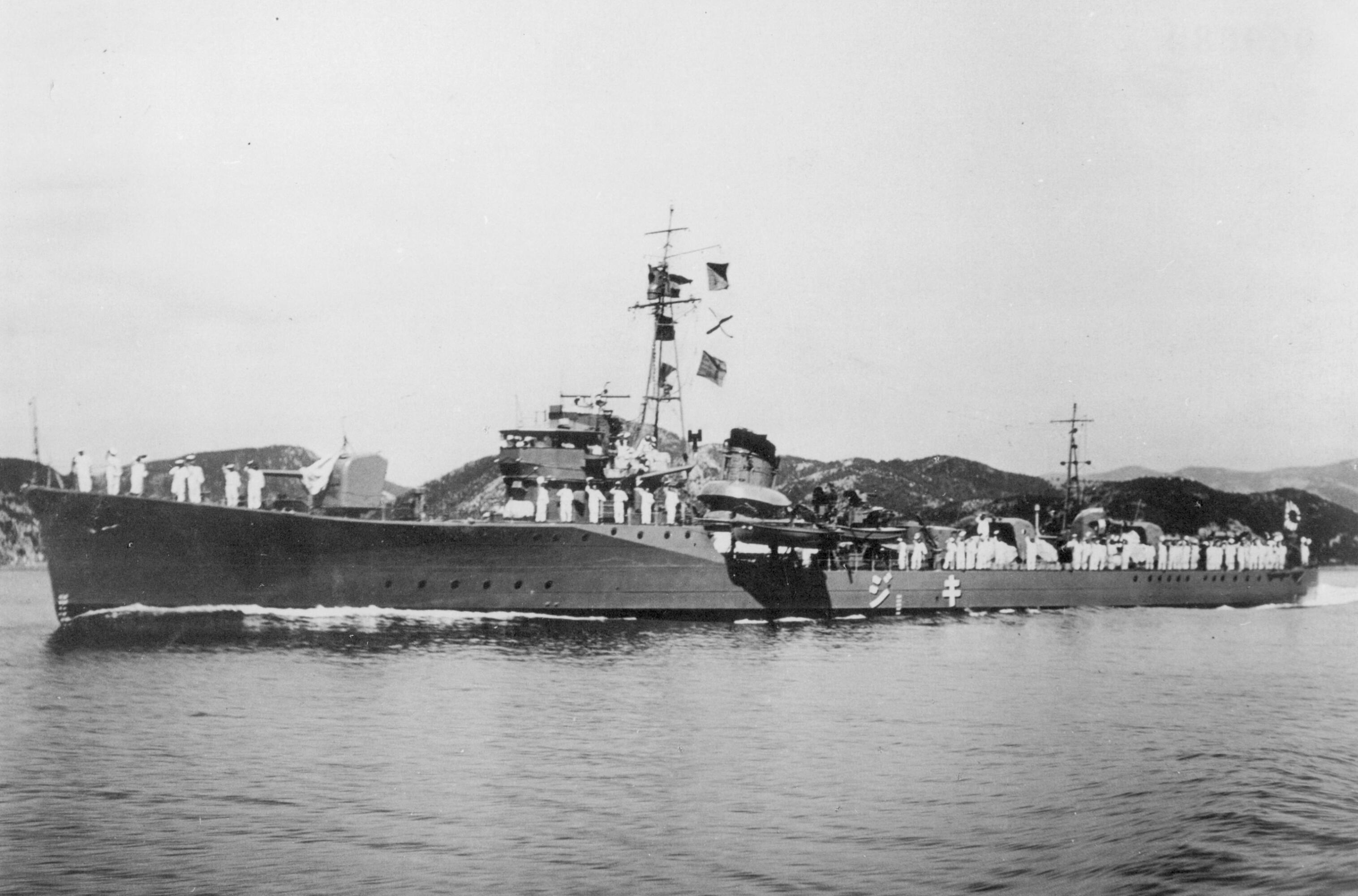
Kiji in 1937

=== 1st Class torpedo boats ===
- Kotaka (1888)
- Chinese torpedo boat captured during the First Sino-Japanese War (1895)
  - Fukuryū (ex-Fulong)
- Shirataka (1899)
- Hayabusa class (1899–1904)
  - Hayabusa, Kasasagi, Manazuru, Chidori, Aotaka, Kari, Hato, Tsubame, Hibari, Kiji, Hashitaka, Sagi, Uzura, Kamome, Ōtori
- German torpedo boats awarded as prizes of World War I (1920)
  - ex-S60, ex-V80, ex-V127, ex-V181
- Chinese torpedo boat captured during the Second Sino-Japanese War (1938)
  - Kawasemi (ex-Hu Oah)

=== 2nd Class torpedo boats ===
- Type 21 (1894-1895)
  - No.21, No.24
- Type 22 (1893-1901)
  - No.22, No.23, No.25, No.31, No.32, No.33, No.34, No.35, No.36, No.37, No.38, No.44, No.45, No.46, No.47, No.48, No.49, No.60, No.61
- Type 29 (1900)
  - No.29, No.30
- Type 39 (1901-1902)
  - No.39, No.40, No.41, No.42, No.43, No.62, No.63, No.64, No.65, No.66
- Type 67 (1903-1904)
  - No.67, No.68, No.69, No.70, No.71, No.72, No.73, No.74, No.75

=== 3rd Class torpedo boats ===
- Type 1 (1881-1884)
  - No.1, No.2, No.3, No.4
- Type 5 (1892–1894)
  - No.5, No.6, No.7, No.8, No.9, No.10, No.11, No.12, No.13, No.14, No.16, No.17, No.18, No.19
- Type 15 (1893)
  - No.15, No.20
- Chinese torpedo boats captured during the First Sino-Japanese War (1895)
  - No.26 (ex-You III) (ja:第二十六号水雷艇), No.27 (ex-You I) (ja:第二十七号水雷艇)
- Type 50 (1900-1902)
  - No.50, No.51, No.52, No.53, No.54, No.55, No.56, No.57, No.58, No.59

=== 4th Class torpedo boats ===
- Chinese torpedo boat captured during the First Sino-Japanese War (1895)
  - No.28 (ex-Chen II) (ja:第二十八号水雷艇)

=== London Naval Treaty era torpedo boats ===
As a consequence of the London Naval Treaty, the Imperial Japanese Navy was constricted on the total tonnage of destroyers it was allowed to build, so Japanese naval planners designed a new 600-ton class vessel, which was small enough not to be limited by the treaty, armed with half the armament of a Fubuki class destroyer, and gave them the obsolete designation of torpedo boats to further ensure that they would not be considered as destroyers.

- Chidori class (1933)
  - Chidori, Hatsukari, Manazuru, Tomozuru
- Ōtori class (1935–1937)
  - Hato, Hayabusa, Hiyodori, Kari, Kasasagi, Kiji, Ōtori, Sagi

== Gunboats ==
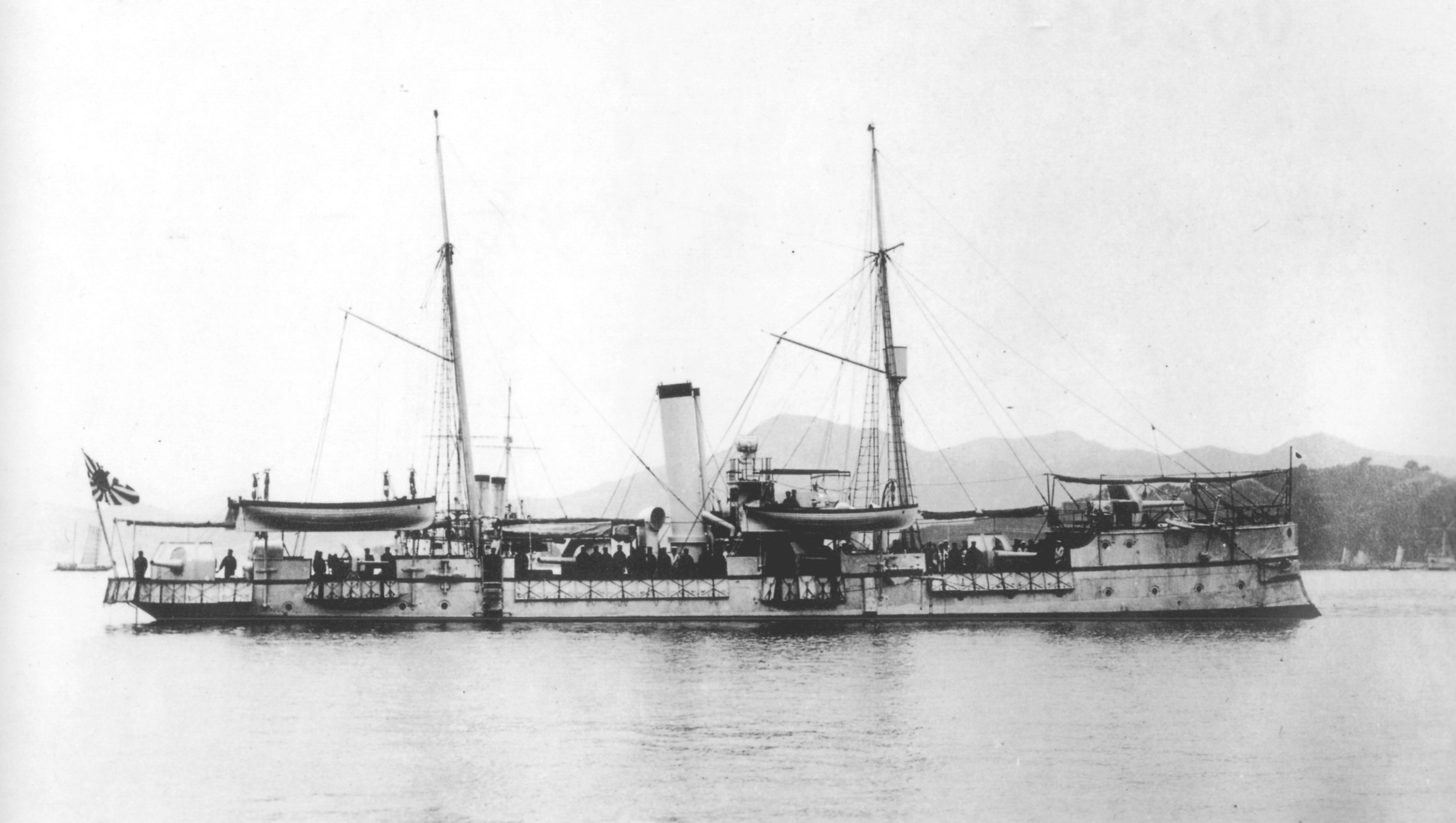
Akagi in 1902

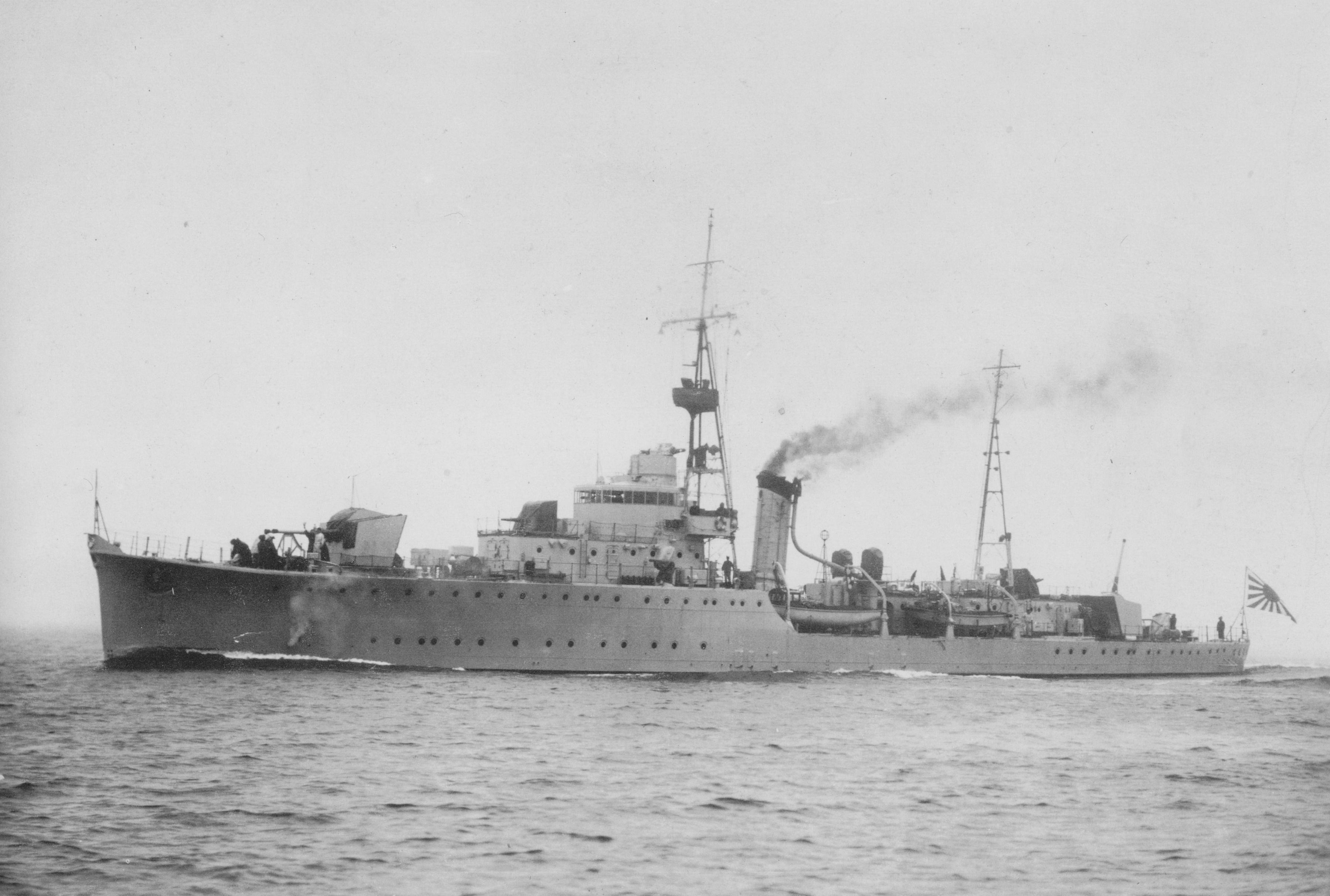
Hashidate in 1940

- Maya class (1886-1888)
  - Maya, Chōkai, Atago, Akagi
- Ōshima (1891)
- Chinese gunboats captured during the First Sino-Japanese War (1895)
  - Chinhoku (ex-Chen Pei) (ja:鎮北 (砲艦)), Chinnan (ex-Chen Nan) (ja:鎮南 (砲艦)), Chinzei (ex-Chen His) (ja:鎮西 (砲艦)), Chintō (ex-Chen Tung) (ja:鎮東 (砲艦)), Chinchu (ex-Chen Chung) (ja:鎮中 (砲艦)), Chinpen (ex-Chen Pien) (ja:鎮辺 (砲艦))
- Chinese ironclad coastal defence ship captured during the First Sino-Japanese War (1895)
  - Heien (ex-Pingyuan)
- Uji (1903)
- Saga (1912)
- Ataka (1922)
- Hashidate class (1939-1940)
  - Hashidate, Uji
- American gunboat captured during the Pacific War (1942)
  - Karatsu (ex-USS Luzon)
- Italian gunboat captured during the Pacific War (1943)
  - Okitsu (ex-Lepanto)

=== River gunboats ===
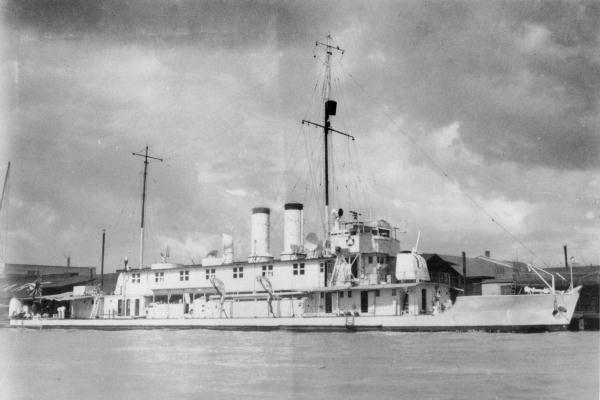
Hozu circa 1935

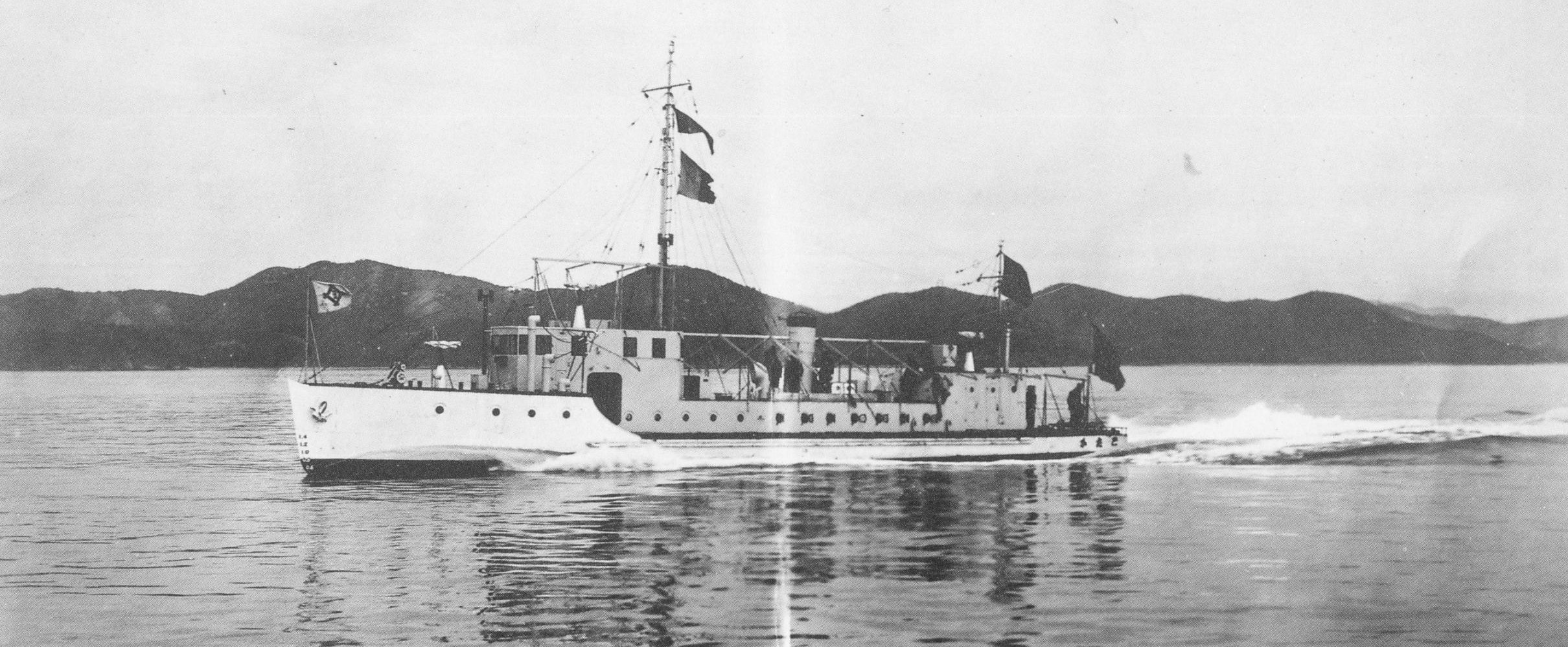
Kotaka in 1929

- Sumida (1903)
- Fushimi (1906)
- Toba (1911)
- Seta class (1922-1923)
  - Hira, Hozu, Katata, Seta
- Atami class (1929)
  - Atami, Futami
- Kotaka (1929)
- Kozakura class (1935)
  - Hakubai, Kozakura
- Fushimi class (1939)
  - Fushimi, Sumida
- American gunboat captured during the Pacific War (1941)
  - Tatara (ex-USS Wake)
- British gunboat captured during the Pacific War (1942)
  - Suma (ex-HMS Moth)
- Italian gunboat captured during the Pacific War (1943)
  - Narumi (ex-Ermanno Carlotto)

== Patrol boats ==
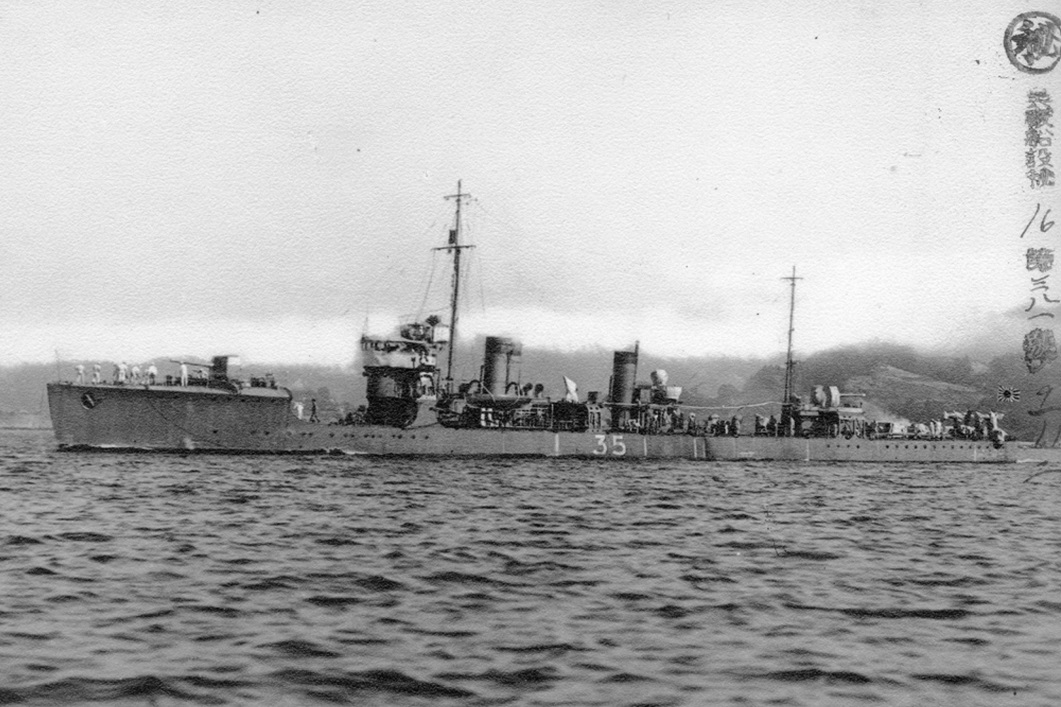
Patrol boat No.35 (ex-Tsuta) circa 1940

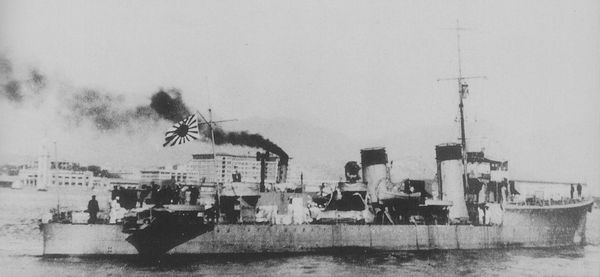
Patrol boat No.101 (ex-HMS Thracian) in 1942

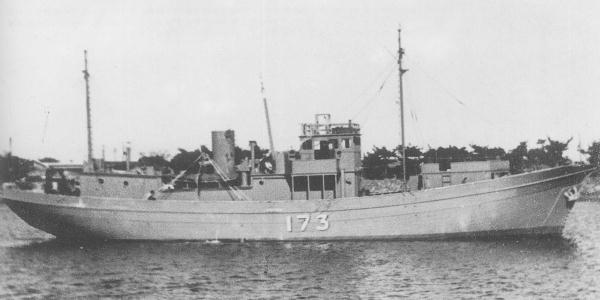
Auxiliary patrol boat No.173 in 1945

- No.1 class (ex-Minekaze class destroyers converted to patrol boats, 1940)
  - No. 1 (ex-Shimakaze), No. 2 (ex-Nadakaze)
- No.31 class (ex-Momi and Wakatake class destroyers converted to patrol boats, 1940)
  - No. 31 (ex-Kiku), No. 32 (ex-Aoi), No. 33 (ex-Hagi), No. 34 (ex-Susuki), No. 35 (ex-Tsuta), No. 36 (ex-Fuji), No. 37 (ex-Hishi), No. 38 (ex-Yomogi), No. 39 (ex-Tade), No. 46 (ex-Yūgao)
- British destroyer captured during the Pacific War (1942)
  - No.101 (ex-HMS Thracian)
- American destroyer captured during the Pacific War (1943)
  - No.102 (ex-USS Stewart)
- American torpedo boat captured during the Pacific War (1943)
  - No.114 (ex-Luzon)
- American minesweeper captured during the Pacific War (1943)
  - No.103 (ex-USS Finch)
- Philippine customs patrol boat captured during the Pacific War (1943)
  - No.105 (ex-Arayat)
- Dutch patrol boats captured during the Pacific War (1944)
  - No.104 (ex-HNLMS Valk), No.108 (ex-HNLMS Arend)
- American tugboat captured during the Pacific War (1944)
  - No.107 (ex-USS Genesee)
- Dutch patrol boat captured during the Pacific War (1945)
  - No.109 (ex-HNLMS Fazant)
- Dutch destroyer captured during the Pacific War (conversion not completed)
  - No.106 (ex-HNLMS Banckert)

=== Auxiliary patrol boats ===
In addition to the purpose-built No.1-class, during the Pacific War the Imperial Japanese Navy requisitioned and converted a number of civilian vessels into auxiliary patrol boats.

- No.1 class (1945)
  - 27 built during the Pacific War, 5 lost; 30 not completed.

== Submarine chasers ==
- No.1-class auxiliary submarine chaser (1943-1945)
  - 200 built during the Pacific War, 81 lost.

== Minelayers ==
- Okinoshima
- Itsukushima
- Yaeyama

== Minesweepers ==
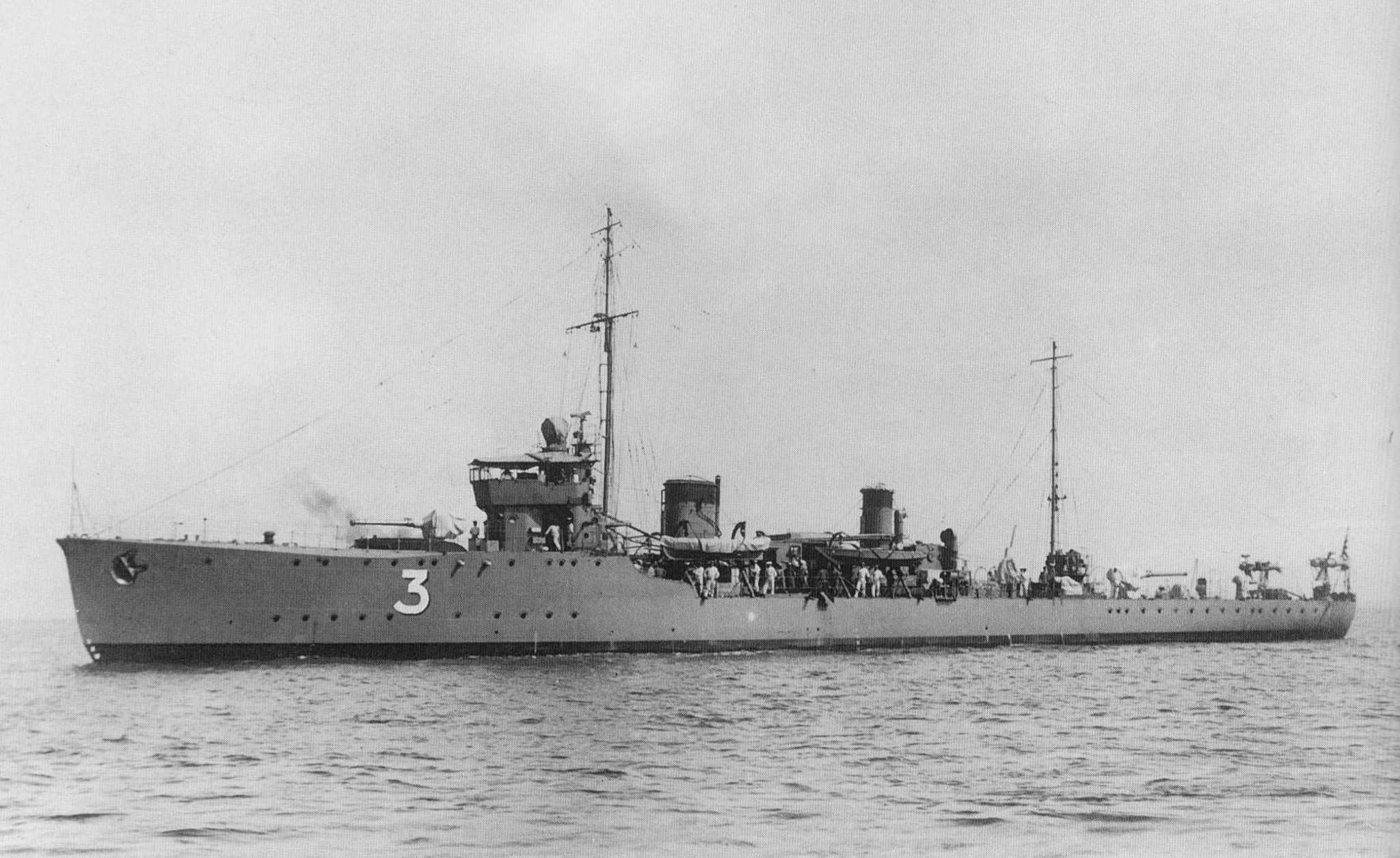
Minesweeper No.3 in 1923

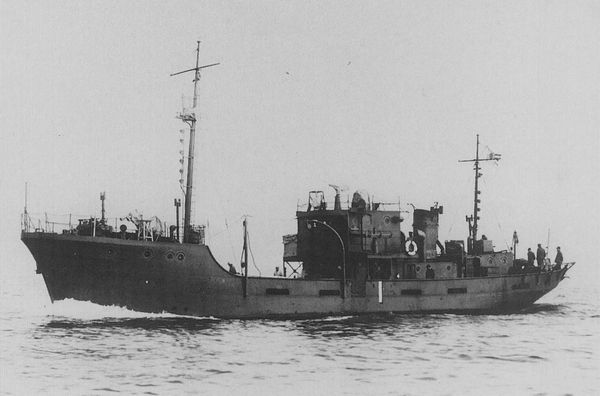
Auxiliary minesweeper No.1 in 1942

This section lists the purpose-built and numbered converted minesweepers of the Imperial Japanese Navy.

- No.1-class (1923-1928)
  - No.1, No.2, No.3, No.4, No.5, No.6
- No.7-class (ex-Kamikaze class destroyers converted to minesweepers, 1924)
  - No.7 (ex-Isonami), No.8 (ex-Uranami), No.9 (ex-Ayanami), No.10 (ex-Minatsuki), No.11 (ex-Nagatsuki), No.12 (ex-Kikutsuki)
- No.7-class (ex-Umikaze class destroyers converted to minesweepers, 1930)
  - No.7 (ex-Umikaze), No.8 (ex-Yamakaze)
- No.9-class (ex-Enoki class destroyers converted to minesweepers, 1930)
  - No.9 (ex-Enoki), No.10 (ex-Nara)
- No.13-class (1933-1935)
  - No.13, No.14, No.15, No.16, No.17, No.18
- No.7-class (1938-1939)
  - No.7, No.8, No.9, No.10, No.11, No.12
- No.19-class (1941-1944)
  - No.19, No.20, No.21, No.22, No.23, No.24, No.25, No.26, No.27, No.28, No.29, No.30, No.33, No.34, No.38, No.39, No.41
- British Bangor class minesweepers captured during the Pacific War (1944)
  - No.101 (ex-HMS Taitam), No.102 (ex-HMS Waglan)

=== Auxiliary minesweepers ===
In addition to the vessels listed below, during the Second Sino-Japanese War and the Pacific War the Imperial Japanese Navy requisitioned and converted a number of civilian vessels into auxiliary minesweepers.

- No.1-class (1941-1943)
  - No.1, No.2, No.3, No.4, No.5, No.6, No.7, No.8, No.9, No.10, No.11, No.12, No.13, No.14, No.15, No.16, No.17, No.18, No.19, No.20, No.21, No.22
- Dutch DEFG class minesweepers captured during the Pacific War (1943-1944)
  - No.101 (ex-HNLMS Flores), No.102 (ex-HNLMS Fakfak), No.103 (ex-HNLMS Garoet), No.104 (ex-HNLMS Djember), No.105 (ex-HNLMS Grissee), No.106 (ex-HNLMS Djombang), No.107 (ex-HNLMS Enggano), ex-HNLMS Djampea (conversion not completed)

== Landing craft ==
- Toku Daihatsu class
- No.1 class
- No.101 class

== Submarines ==
=== 1st Class submarines ===
- Kaidai type
  - Type KD1, Kaidai 1 gata (海大1型), I-51.
  - Type KD2, Kaidai 2 gata (海大2型), I-152 (ex-I-52).
  - Type KD3a, Kaidai 3 gata a (海大3型a), 4 units, I-153 (ex-I-53), I-154 (ex-I-54), I-155 (ex-I-55), I-158 (ex-I-58).
  - Type KD3b, Kaidai 3 gata b (海大3型b), 5 units, I-156 (ex-I-56), I-157 (ex-I-57), I-159 (ex-I-59), I-60, I-63.
  - Type KD4, Kaidai 4 gata (海大4型), 3 units, I-61, I-162 (ex-I-62), I-164 (ex-I-64)
  - Type KD5, Kaidai 5 gata (海大5型), 3 units, I-165 (ex-I-65), I-166 (ex-I-66), I-67
  - Type KD6a, Kaidai 6 gata a (海大6型a), 6 units, I-168 (ex-I-68), I-169 (ex-I-69), I-70, I-171 (ex-I-71), I-172 (ex-I-72), I-73.
  - Type KD6b, Kaidai 6 gata b (海大6型b), 2 units, I-174 (ex-I-74), I-175 (ex-I-75).
  - Type KD7, Kaidai 7 gata (海大7型), 10 units, I-176 (ex-I-76), I-177, I-178, I-179, I-180, I-181, I-182, I-183, I-184, I-185.
- Junsen type
  - Type J1, Junsen ichi gata (巡潜一型), 4 units, I-1, I-2, I-3, I-4.
  - Type J1M, Junsen ichi gata kai (巡潜一型改), I-5.
  - Type J2, Junsen ni gata (巡潜二型), I-6.
  - Type J3, Junsen san gata (巡潜三型), 2 units, I-7, I-8.
- Junsen Type A
  - Type A1, Kō gata (甲型), 3 units, I-9, I-10, I-11.
  - Type A2, Kō gata kai ichi (甲型改一), I-12.
  - Type A3, Kō gata kai ni (甲型改二), 2 units, I-13, I-14.
- Junsen Type B
  - Type B1, Otsu gata (乙型), 20 units, I-15, I-17, I-19, I-21, I-23, I-25, I-26, I-27, I-28, I-29, I-30, I-31, I-32, I-33, I-34, I-35, I-36, I-37, I-38, I-39.
  - Type B2, Otsu gata kai ichi (乙型改一), 6 units, I-40, I-41, I-42, I-43, I-44, I-45.
  - Type B3, Otsu gata kai ni (乙型改二), 3 units, I-54, I-55, I-58.
- Junsen Type C
  - Type C1, Hei gata (丙型), 8 units, I-16, I-18, I-20, I-22, I-24, I-46, I-47, I-48.

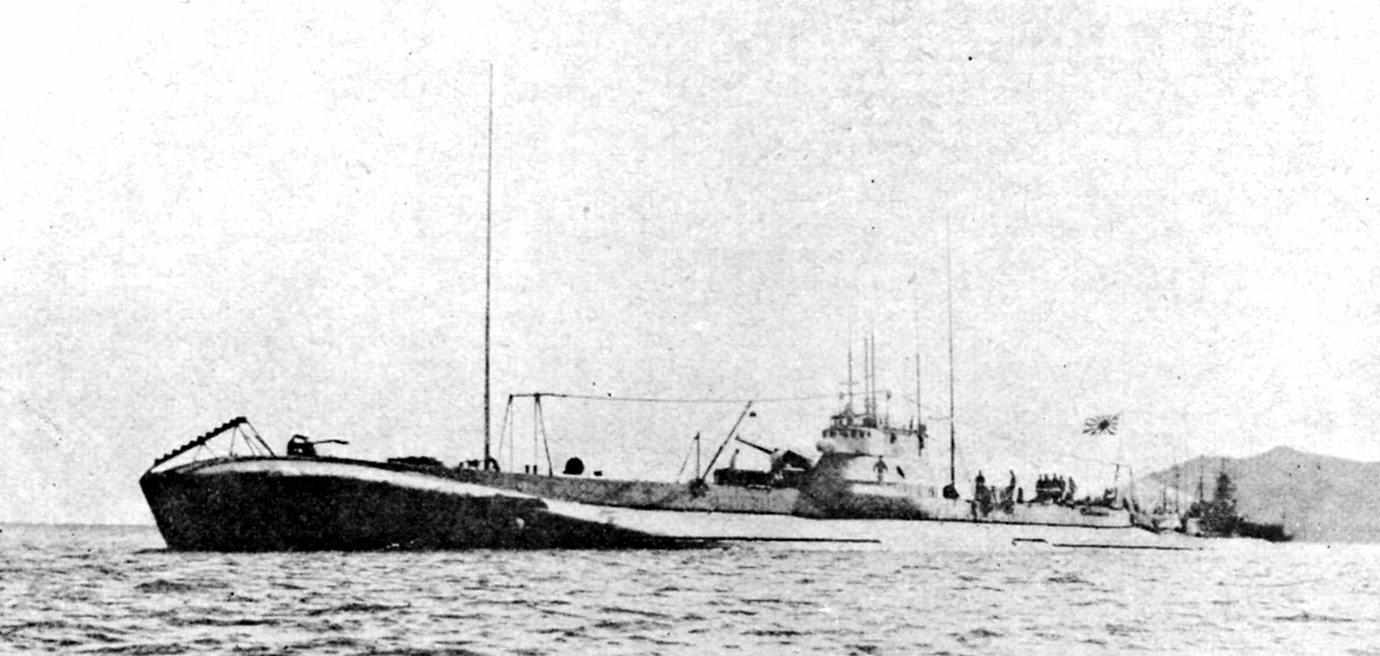
C3 type I-55

  - Type C3, Hei gata kai (丙型改), 3 units, I-52, I-53, I-55.
- Type D / Sen'yu-Dai type
  - Type D1, Tei gata (丁型), 12 units, I-361, I-362, I-363, I-364, I-365, I-366, I-367, I-368, I-369, I-370, I-371, I-372 (S51B).
  - Type D2, Tei gata kai (丁型改), I-373.

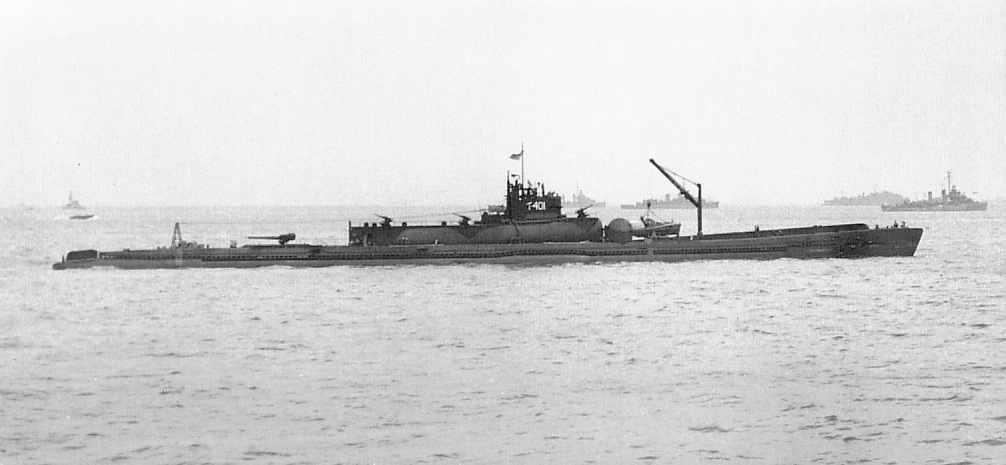
Sentoku type I-401

- Sentoku type, Toku gata (特型), 3 units, I-400, I-401, I-402 (I-404 not launched, I-405 not completed).
- Sentaka-Dai type, Sentaka (潜高), 3 units, I-201, I-202, I-203 (I-204 to I-208 not completed).
- Senho type, Senho (潜補), I-351 (I-352 not completed).
- Kiraisen type, Kiraisen (機雷潜), 4 units I-121 (ex-I-21), I-122 (ex-I-22), I-123 (ex-I-23), I-124 (ex-I-24).
- Captured German submarines, 6 units, I-501 (ex-U-181), I-502 (ex-U-862), I-503 (ex-UIT-24, ex-Comandante Cappellini), I-504 (ex-UIT-25, ex-Luigi Torelli), I-505 (ex-U-219), I-506 (ex-U-195).

=== 2nd Class submarines ===
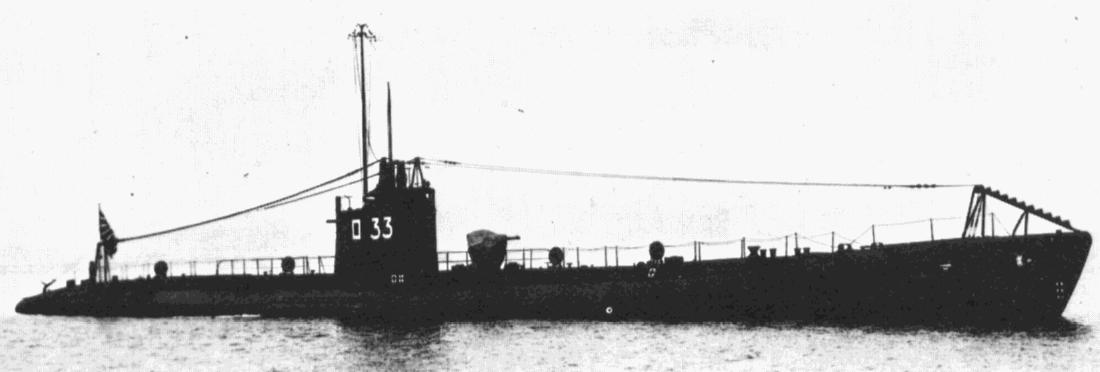
Kaichū VI Ro-33

- Type F
  - Type F1, Ro-ichi-gata (F1型（呂一型) 2 units, Ro-1, Ro-2.
  - Type F2, Ro-san-gata (F2型（呂三型), 3 units, Ro-3, Ro-4, Ro-5.
- Kaichū type
  - Type K1, Kaichū 1 gata (海中I型), 2 units, Ro-11, Ro-12.
  - Type K2, Kaichū 2 gata (海中II型), 3 units, Ro-13, Ro-14, Ro-15.
  - Type K3, Kaichū 3 gata (海中III型), 10 units, Ro-16, Ro-17, Ro-18, Ro-19, Ro-20, Ro-21, Ro-22, Ro-23, Ro-24, Ro-25.
  - Type K4, Kaichū 4 gata (海中IV型), 3 units, Ro-26, Ro-27, Ro-28.
  - Type K5 (Toku-Chū), Kaichū 5 gata/Toku-Chū (海中V型/特中型), 5 units, Ro-29, Ro-30, Submarine No.70, Ro-31, Ro-32.
  - Type K6, Kaichū 6 gata (海中VI型), 2 units, Ro-33, Ro-34.
  - Type K7 (Sen-Chū), Kaichū 7 gata/Sen-Chū (海中VII型/潜中型), 18 units, Ro-35, Ro-36, Ro-37, Ro-38, Ro-39, Ro-40, Ro-41, Ro-42, Ro-43, Ro-44, Ro-45, Ro-46, Ro-47, Ro-48, Ro-49, Ro-50, Ro-55, Ro-56.
- Type L
  - Type L1, Ro go jū 1 gata (L1型), 2 units, Ro-51, Ro-52.
  - Type L2, Ro go jū 2 gata (L2型), 4 units, Ro-53, Ro-54, Ro-55, Ro-56.
  - Type L3, Ro go jū 3 gata (L3型), 3 units, Ro-57, Ro-58, Ro-59.
  - Type L4, Ro go jū 4 gata (L4型), 9 units, Ro-60, Ro-61, Ro-62, Ro-63, Ro-64, Ro-65, Ro-66, Ro-67, Ro-68.
- Ko type, Ko gata (小型), 18 units, Ro-100, Ro-101, Ro-102, Ro-103, Ro-104, Ro-105, Ro-106, Ro-107, Ro-108, Ro-109, Ro-110, Ro-111, Ro-112, Ro-113, Ro-114, Ro-115, Ro-116, Ro-117.
- Ex-German submarines, 2 units, Ro-500 (ex-U-511), Ro-501 (ex-U-1224).

=== 3rd Class submarines ===
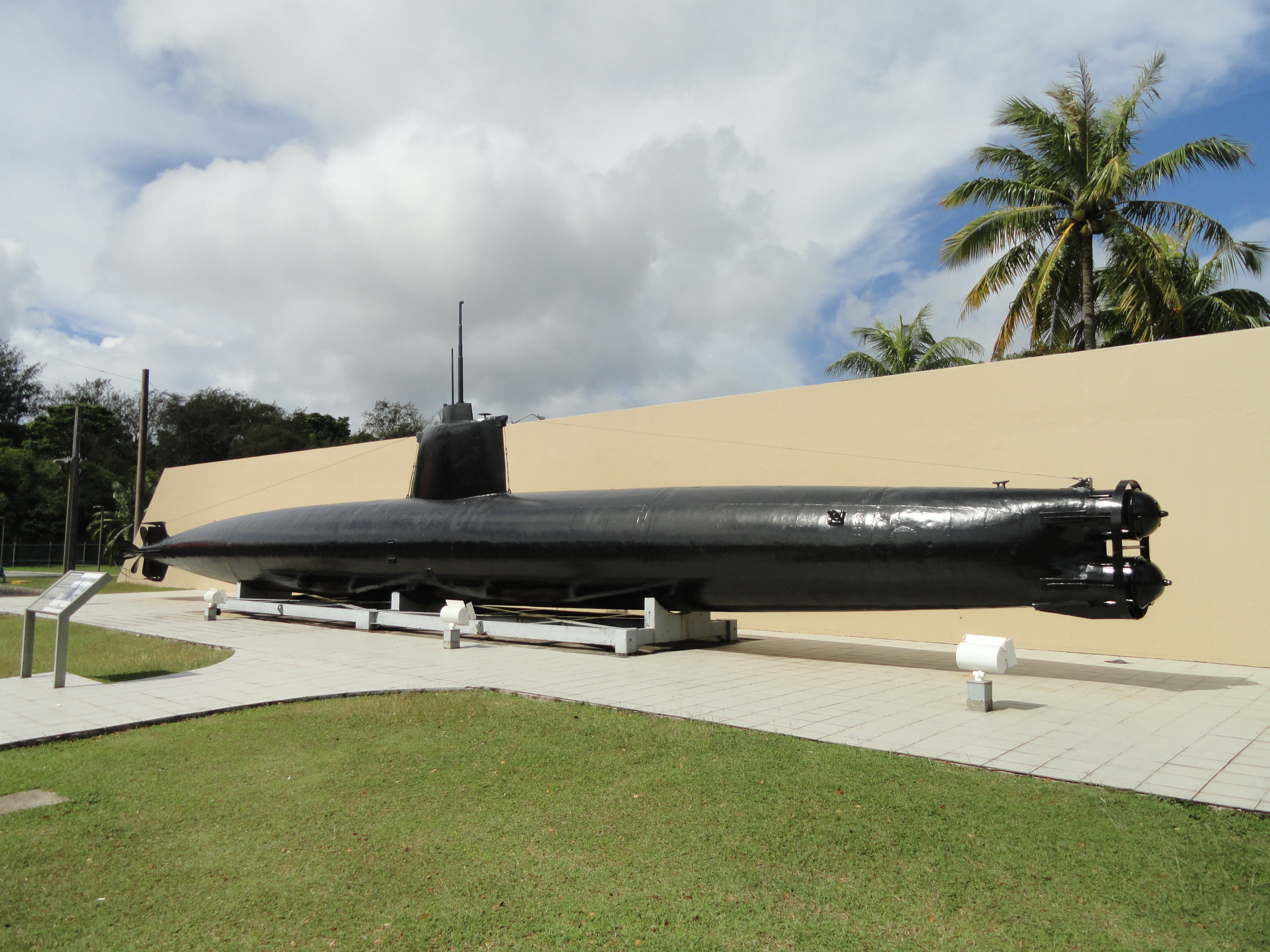
Kō-hyōteki class submarine on display at the War in the Pacific National Historical Park

- Type C
  - Type C1, C1 gata (C1型), 2 units, Ha-1, Ha-2.
  - Type C2, C2 gata (C2型), 3 units, Ha-3, Ha-4, Ha-5.
  - Type C3, C3 gata (C3型), 2 units, Ha-7, Ha-8.
- Vickers/Kawasaki type, Ha-6.
- Type S, S gata (S型), 3 units, Submarine No.14, Ha-9, Ha-10.
- Sen'yu-Shō type, Sen-Yu-Ko gata (潜輸小型), 10 units, Ha-101, Ha-102, Ha-103, Ha-104, Ha-105, Ha-106, Ha-107, Ha-108, Ha-109, Ha-111 (Ha-110 and Ha-112 not completed).
- Sentaka-Shō type, Sen-Taka-Ko gata (潜高小型), 10 units, Ha-201, Ha-202, Ha-203, Ha-204, Ha-205, Ha-207, Ha-208, Ha-209, Ha-210, Ha-216 (Ha-206, Ha-211 to Ha-215, Ha-217 to Ha-279 not completed).

=== Midget submarines ===
- Kō-hyōteki class, Kō-hyōteki (甲標的), 216 units (597 planned).
- Kairyū class, Kairyū (海龍), approx. 210 units (760 planned).

=== Early and experimental submarines ===
- Holland type, 5 units.
- modified Holland type, 2 units.
- Submarine No.71, Dai 71 gou-kan (第71号艦).

== Suicide vessels ==
- Shinyo motorboat, Shin'yō (震洋), 6,197 units (11,300 planned).
- Kaiten torpedo, Kaiten (回天), approx. 420 units.

== Miscellaneous vessels ==
- Meiji Maru (1873)
- Kōsai Maru (1930)
- Nippon Maru (1930)
- Kaiwo Maru (1930)

== Imperial Japanese Army ==
Due to various political reasons, the Imperial Japanese Army used its separate navy during the Second World War, mostly to support with logistical support and ground invasion operations.

=== Escort carriers ===
- Special 2TL Type auxiliary escort carrier
  - Yamashio Maru (1944)
  - Chigusa Maru (not completed)

=== Landing craft carriers ===
Landing craft carriers were an innovation exclusively used by the Army, with some being fitted with a flight deck for limited aerial operations.

- Shinshū Maru
- Type C Landing Craft Carrier
  - Akitsu Maru (1941, landing craft carrier and escort carrier)
- M Type C Landing Craft Carrier
  - Kumano Maru (1945, landing craft carrier and escort carrier)
  - Tokitsu Maru (not completed, later completed as a whaling ship in 1946)
- Type A Landing Craft Carrier
  - Nigitsu Maru (1943)
  - Mayasan Maru (1942)
  - Tamatsu Maru (1944)
- M Type A Landing Craft Carrier
  - Kibitsu Maru (1943)
  - Hyūga Maru (1944)
  - Settsu Maru (1945)
- Type B Landing Craft Carrier
  - Takatsu Maru (1944, with icebreaker capability)

=== Submarines ===
The Army only used transport submarines, with limited defensive capacity:

- Type 3 submergence transport vehicle (38 vessels)
  - Yu I type
    - Yu 1-class
    - Yu 1001-class
    - Yu 2001-class
    - Yu 3001-class
  - Yu II type
    - Ushio (1945, not completed)

=== Small craft ===
- Daihatsu class
- Shōhatsu class
- Sōkōtei class
- ST class
- SS class
- No.101 class

== See also ==
- Japanese ship naming conventions
- List of aircraft of the Imperial Japanese Navy
- List of infantry weapons of the Imperial Japanese Navy
- List of Japanese Navy ships and war vessels in World War II
  - List of battleships of Japan
  - List of battlecruisers of Japan
  - List of cruiser classes of the Imperial Japanese Navy
  - List of cruisers of Japan
  - List of destroyers of Japan
    - Japanese destroyers of World War II
  - Submarines of the Imperial Japanese Navy
    - Submarine aircraft carriers of Japan
- List of sunken aircraft carriers
- List of aircraft carriers by country
- Ranks of the Imperial Japanese Navy
