= Japanese destroyer Oite (1906) =

Destroyer of the Imperial Japanese Navy

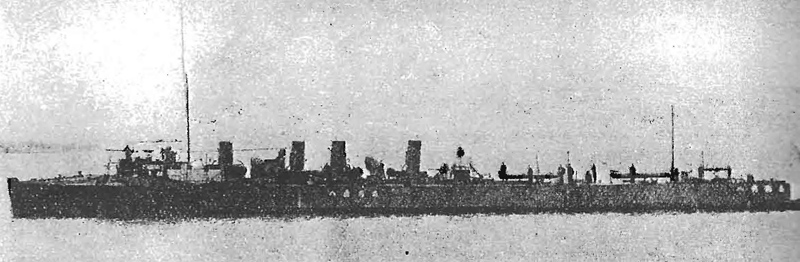
- Sister ship Ayanami

History

Empire of Japan
- Name: Oite
- Builder: Maizuru Naval Arsenal
- Launched: 10 January 1906
- Completed: 21 August 1906
- Decommissioned: 1 December 1924
- Out of service: 8 December 1930
- Reclassified: As a tugboat and dispatch boat, 18 November 1925
- Fate: Scrapped, 1931

General characteristics (as built)
- Class & type: Kamikaze-class destroyer
- Displacement: 381 long tons (387 t); 450 long tons (460 t) (full load)
- Length: 227 ft (69.2 m) (pp); 234 ft (71 m) (o/a)
- Beam: 21 ft 7 in (6.6 m)
- Draught: 6 ft (1.8 m)
- Installed power: 4 boilers; 6,000 ihp (4,500 kW)
- Propulsion: 2 shafts; 2 triple-expansion steam engines
- Speed: 29 knots (54 km/h; 33 mph)
- Range: 1,200 nmi (2,200 km; 1,400 mi) at 15 knots (28 km/h; 17 mph)
- Complement: 70
- Armament: 2 × single 3 in (76 mm) 12 cwt guns; 4 × single 3 in (76 mm) 8 cwt guns; 2 × single 450 mm (17.7 in) torpedo tubes

Oite (追手) ("Pursuer") was one of 32 Kamikaze-class destroyers built for the Imperial Japanese Navy (IJN) in the first decade of the 20th century.

== Design and description ==
The Kamikaze-class destroyers were improved versions of the preceding Harusame class. They displaced 381 long tons (387 t) at normal load and 450 long tons (460 t) at deep load. The ships had a length between perpendiculars of 227 feet (69.2 m) and an overall length of 234 feet (71.3 m), a beam of 21 feet 7 inches (6.6 m) and a draught of 6 feet (1.8 m). The Kamikazes were powered by two vertical triple-expansion steam engines, each driving one shaft using steam produced by four Kampon water-tube boilers. The engines produced a total of 6,000 indicated horsepower (4,500 kW) that gave the ships a maximum speed of 29 knots (54 km/h; 33 mph). They carried a maximum of 100 long tons (102 t) of coal which gave them a range of 1,500 nautical miles (2,800 km; 1,700 mi) at a speed of 15 knots (28 km/h; 17 mph). Their crew consisted of 70 officers and ratings.

The main armament of the Kamikaze-class ships consisted of two 40-calibre quick-firing (QF) three-inch (76 mm) 12 cwt guns (Note: "Cwt" is the abbreviation for hundredweight, 12 cwt referring to the weight of the gun.) on single mounts; the forward gun was located on superstructure, but the aft gun was at the stern. Four 28-calibre QF three-inch 8 cwt guns on single mounts were positioned abreast the superstructure, two in each broadside. The ships were also armed with two single rotating mounts for 450-millimetre (17.7 in) torpedoes between the superstructure and the stern gun. When Asakaze was converted into a minesweeper in 1924, she was rearmed with a pair of 12-centimetre (4.7 in) 3rd Year Type guns taken from older ships on single mounts and the three-inch 8 cwt guns were removed.

== Construction and career ==
Oite was launched at the Maizuru Naval Arsenal on 10 January 1906 and completed on 21 August. The ship was decommissioned on 1 December 1924, although she was reclassified as a tugboat and dispatch boat on 18 November 1925. Oite was taken out of service on 8 December 1930 and subsequently broken up.

== Books ==
- Friedman, Norman (1985). "Japan". In Gardiner, Robert & Gray, Randal (eds.). Conway's All the World's Fighting Ships 1906–1921. Annapolis: Naval Institute Press. ISBN 0-87021-907-3.
- Friedman, Norman (2011). Naval Weapons of World War One. Barnsley, South Yorkshire, UK: Seaforth. ISBN 978-1-84832-100-7.
- Jentschura, Hansgeorg; Jung, Dieter & Mickel, Peter (1977). Warships of the Imperial Japanese Navy, 1869–1945. Annapolis, Maryland: United States Naval Institute. ISBN 0-87021-893-X.
- Todaka, Kazushige; Fukui, Shizuo; Eldridge, Robert D. & Leonard, Graham B. (2020). Destroyers: Selected Photos from the Archives of the Kure Maritime Museum; the Best from the Collection of Shizuo Fukui's Photos of Japanese Warships. Japanese Naval Warship Photo Album. Annapolis, Maryland: Naval Institute Press. ISBN 978-1-59114-630-8.
- Watts, Anthony J. & Gordon, Brian G. (1971). The Imperial Japanese Navy. London: Macdonald. ISBN 0-35603-045-8.
