= Japanese destroyer Shirotae =

Destroyer of the Imperial Japanese Navy

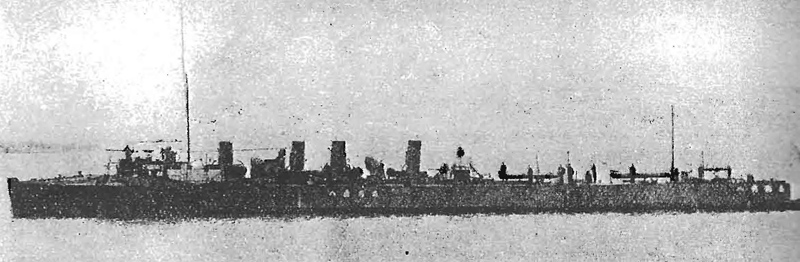
- Sister ship Ayanami

History

Empire of Japan
- Name: Shirotae
- Builder: Mitsubishi Shipyards, Nagasaki
- Laid down: 25 July 1905
- Launched: 30 July 1906
- Completed: 20 November 1906
- Fate: Ran aground and wrecked, 31 August 1914

General characteristics (as built)
- Class & type: Kamikaze-class destroyer
- Displacement: 381 long tons (387 t); 450 long tons (460 t) (full load)
- Length: 227 ft (69.2 m) (pp); 234 ft (71 m) (o/a)
- Beam: 21 ft 7 in (6.6 m)
- Draught: 6 ft (1.8 m)
- Installed power: 4 boilers; 6,000 ihp (4,500 kW)
- Propulsion: 2 shafts; 2 triple-expansion steam engines
- Speed: 29 knots (54 km/h; 33 mph)
- Range: 1,200 nmi (2,200 km; 1,400 mi) at 15 knots (28 km/h; 17 mph)
- Complement: 70
- Armament: 2 × single 3 in (76 mm) 12 cwt guns; 4 × single 3 in (76 mm) 8 cwt guns; 2 × single 450 mm (17.7 in) torpedo tubes

Shirotae (白妙) ("White cloth") was one of 32 Kamikaze-class destroyers built for the Imperial Japanese Navy (IJN) in the first decade of the 20th century.

== Design and description ==
The Kamikaze-class destroyers were improved versions of the preceding Harusame class. They displaced 381 long tons (387 t) at normal load and 450 long tons (460 t) at deep load. The ships had a length between perpendiculars of 227 feet (69.2 m) and an overall length of 234 feet (71.3 m), a beam of 21 feet 7 inches (6.6 m) and a draught of 6 feet (1.8 m). The Kamikazes were powered by two vertical triple-expansion steam engines, each driving one shaft using steam produced by four Kampon water-tube boilers. The engines produced a total of 6,000 indicated horsepower (4,500 kW) that gave the ships a maximum speed of 29 knots (54 km/h; 33 mph). They carried a maximum of 100 long tons (102 t) of coal which gave them a range of 1,500 nautical miles (2,800 km; 1,700 mi) at a speed of 15 knots (28 km/h; 17 mph). Their crew consisted of 70 officers and ratings.

The main armament of the Kamikaze-class ships consisted of two 40-calibre quick-firing (QF) three-inch (76 mm) 12 cwt guns (Note: "Cwt" is the abbreviation for hundredweight, 12 cwt referring to the weight of the gun.) on single mounts; the forward gun was located on superstructure, but the aft gun was at the stern. Four 28-calibre QF three-inch 8 cwt guns on single mounts were positioned abreast the superstructure, two in each broadside. The ships were also armed with two single rotating mounts for 450-millimetre (17.7 in) torpedoes between the superstructure and the stern gun.

== Construction and career ==
Shirotae was laid down at Mitsubishi's shipyard in Nagasaki on 25 July 1905 and launched on 30 July 1906. Completed on 20 November 1906, the ship saw service in World War I and ran aground in Jiaozhou Bay, China, on 31 August 1914 during the Siege of Tsingtao. She was wrecked beyond repair on 3 September.

== Books ==
- Friedman, Norman (1985). "Japan". In Gardiner, Robert & Gray, Randal (eds.). Conway's All the World's Fighting Ships 1906–1921. Annapolis: Naval Institute Press. ISBN 0-87021-907-3.
- Friedman, Norman (2011). Naval Weapons of World War One: Guns, Torpedoes, Mines and ASW Weapons of All Nations; An Illustrated Directory. Barnsley, UK: Seaforth Publishing. ISBN 978-1-84832-100-7.
- Jentschura, Hansgeorg; Jung, Dieter & Mickel, Peter (1977). Warships of the Imperial Japanese Navy, 1869–1945. Annapolis, Maryland: United States Naval Institute. ISBN 0-87021-893-X.
- Todaka, Kazushige; Fukui, Shizuo; Eldridge, Robert D. & Leonard, Graham B. (2020). Destroyers: Selected Photos from the Archives of the Kure Maritime Museum; the Best from the Collection of Shizuo Fukui's Photos of Japanese Warships. Japanese Naval Warship Photo Album. Annapolis, Maryland: Naval Institute Press. ISBN 978-1-59114-630-8.
- Watts, Anthony J. & Gordon, Brian G. (1971). The Imperial Japanese Navy. London: Macdonald. ISBN 0-35603-045-8.
