= Japanese destroyer Uzuki =

Two destroyers of the Imperial Japanese Navy were named Uzuki:

- Japanese destroyer Uzuki (1906), a Kamikaze-class destroyer launched in 1906 and stricken in 1925
- Japanese destroyer Uzuki (1925), a Mutsuki-class destroyer launched in 1925 and sunk in 1944
