= Japanese destroyer Nagatsuki =

Three destroyers of Japan were named Nagatsuki:

- Japanese destroyer Nagatsuki (1906), a Kamikaze-class destroyer launched in 1906 and stricken in 1930
- Japanese destroyer Nagatsuki (1926), a Mutsuki-class destroyer launched in 1926 and sunk in 1943
- JDS Nagatsuki, a Takatsuki-class destroyer launched in 1969 and expended as a target in 1998
