= W10 =

W10 may refer to:

== Automobiles ==
- Mercedes AMG F1 W10 EQ Power+, a racing car
- Mercedes-Benz W10, a German touring car
- Nissan Avenir (W10), a station wagon
- Toyota MR2 (W10), a sports car

== Other uses ==
- British NVC community W10, one of the woodland communities in the British Isles
- Handley Page W.10, a British biplane airliner
- Japanese minesweeper W-10, various vessels
- London Buses route W10
- Pentax Optio W10, a photographic camera
- Truncated dodecahedron
- West 10 LDN, a BBC drama
- Windows 10, an operating system
- W10, a postcode district in London, England
