= Japanese minesweeper W-10 =

Three Japanese minesweepers have been named No.10 minesweeper (第十号掃海艇, Dai Jū Gō Sōkaitei, or "W-10"):

- Japanese minesweeper No. 10 (1926), ex-Japanese destroyer Minatsuki (1906), a Kamikaze-class destroyer (1905) of the Imperial Japanese Navy in World War I
- Japanese minesweeper No. 10 (1930), ex-Japanese destroyer Enoki (1918), an Enoki-class destroyer of the Imperial Japanese Navy in World War I
- Japanese minesweeper No. 10 (1938), a No.7-class minesweeper (1938) of the Imperial Japanese Navy in World War II

== See also ==
- Japanese auxiliary minesweeper No. 10, a No.1-class auxiliary minesweeper of the Imperial Japanese Navy in World War II
- JDS Minesweeping boat No. 10 (MSB-710), a MSB No.7-class minesweeping boat of the Japan Maritime Self-Defense Force
