= Japanese destroyer Fubuki =

Two ships of the Japanese Navy have been named Fubuki:

- Japanese destroyer Fubuki (1905), a Harusame-class destroyer launched in 1905 and broken up in 1924.
- Japanese destroyer Fubuki (1927), a Fubuki-class destroyer launched in 1927 and sunk in 1942.
