= Wakaba =

Wakaba, a Japanese word and name meaning "young leaf", may refer to:

== Characters ==
- Wakaba, a character from the series Pro Golfer Saru
- Hinata Wakaba, in the video game Rival Schools
- Moe Wakaba, in the manga and anime Future Diary
- Mutsumi Wakaba, a character in the media franchise BanG Dream!
- Wakaba Hiiro, in the series So I'm a Spider, So What?
- Wakaba Mine, in the manga and anime Fairy Tale
- Wakaba Nogi, in the anime Yuki Yuna Is a Hero
- Wakaba Shinohara, in the anime Revolutionary Girl Utena
- Wakaba Tsukishima, in the manga and anime Cross Game
- Wakaba Saegusa, in the anime Vividred Operation

== People ==
- Ryuya Wakaba (born 1989), Japanese actor
- Wakaba Hara (born 2000), Japanese rugby sevens player
- Wakaba Higuchi (born 2001), Japanese figure skater
- Wakaba Shimoguchi (born 1998), Japanese football player
- Wakaba Suzuki (born 1970), Japanese judoka
- Wakaba Tomita (born 1997), Japanese judoka

== Ships ==
- Japanese destroyer Wakaba (1905), a Kamikaze-class destroyer in service 1905–1928
- Japanese destroyer Wakaba (1934), a Hatsuharu-class destroyer sunk at the Battle of Leyte Gulf in 1944
- JDS Wakaba, the former Japanese destroyer Nashi; sunk in 1945, salvaged in 1954, and restored to service as Wakaba in 1956

== Other uses ==
- Wakaba-ku, a ward of Chiba, Japan
- Wakaba Station, a passenger railway station in Sakado, Saitama, Japan
- Wakaba mark, or shoshinsha mark, a sign displayed in new drivers' cars in Japan
