= Kamikaze-class destroyer (1905) =

1905 class of Japanese destroyers

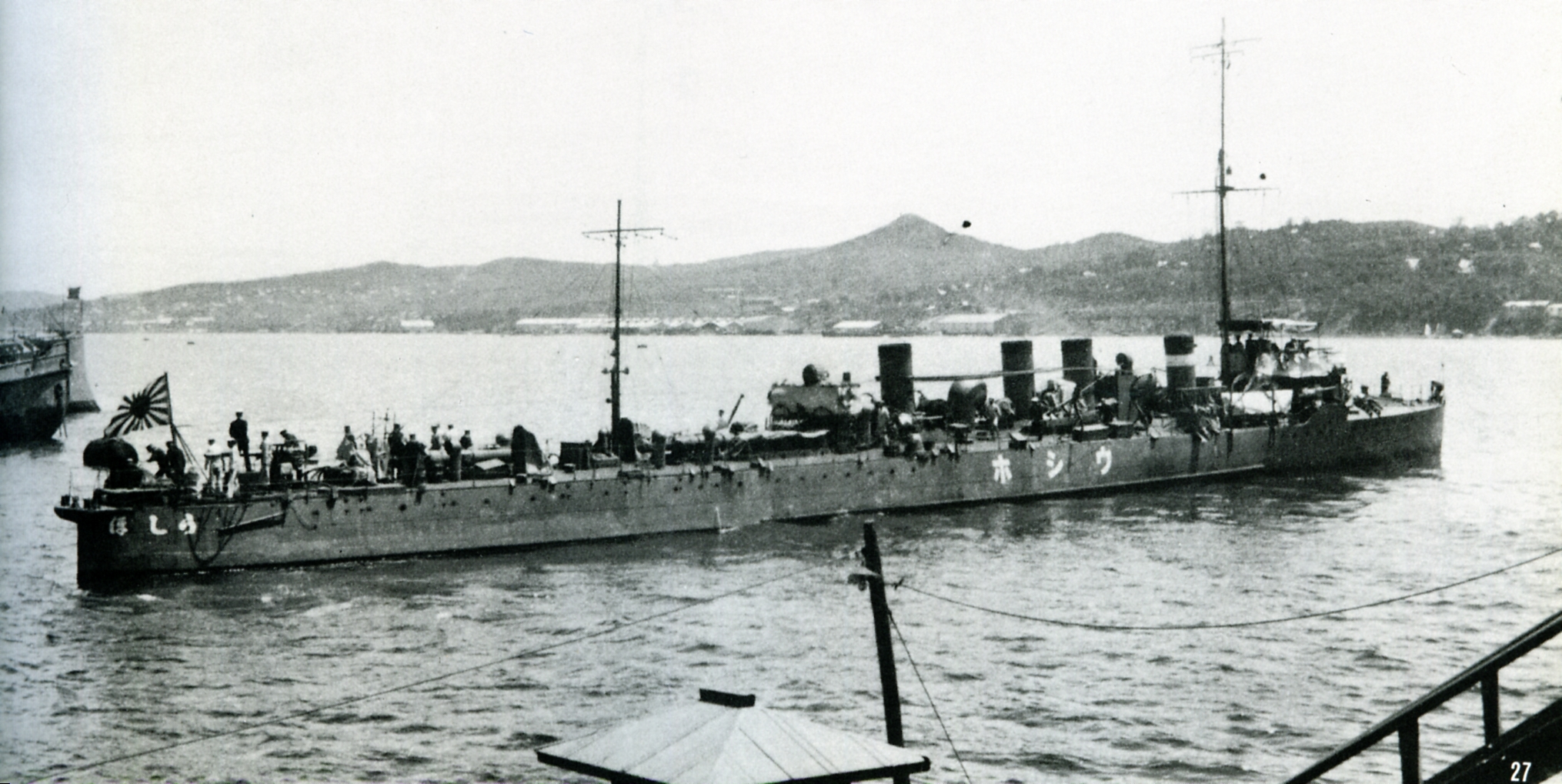
- Japanese destroyer Ushio at Vladivostok 1920

Class overview
- Name: Kamikaze class
- Operators: Imperial Japanese Navy
- Preceded by: Harusame class
- Succeeded by: Umikaze class
- In commission: 16 August 1905 – 1 April 1928
- Completed: 32
- Lost: 2
- Retired: 30

General characteristics
- Type: Destroyer
- Displacement: 381 long tons (387 t) normal, 450 long tons (457 t)
- Length: 69.2 m (227 ft) pp, 72 m (236 ft)
- Beam: 6.57 m (21.6 ft)
- Draught: 1.8 m (5.9 ft)
- Propulsion: 2-shaft reciprocating, 4 coal-fired boilers, 6,000 ihp (4,500 kW)
- Speed: 29 knots (54 km/h)
- Range: 850 nmi (1,570 km) at 11 kn (20 km/h)
- Complement: 70
- Armament: 2 × QF 12 pounder 12 cwt naval guns; 4 × QF 12 pounder 8 cwt naval guns; 2 × 18-inch (457 mm) torpedoes

The Kamikaze-class destroyers (神風型駆逐艦, Kamikaze-gata kuchikukan; "divine wind") were a class of thirty-two torpedo boat destroyers (TBDs) of the Imperial Japanese Navy. The Kamikaze class of destroyers were the first destroyers to be mass-produced in Japan. The class is also sometimes referred to as the Asakaze class. This class of destroyer should not be confused with the later Kamikaze-class destroyers built in 1922, which participated in the Pacific War.

== Background ==
The Kamikaze-class destroyers were part of the 1904 Imperial Japanese Navy Emergency Expansion Program created by the outbreak of the Russo-Japanese War. Twenty-five vessels were ordered in 1904; an additional four vessels were ordered in 1905, and three more in 1906, bringing the total to thirty-two ships. The Japanese governmental shipyards were overwhelmed with the volume of construction, and for the first time civilian shipyards were also assigned to produce warships.

== Design ==
In terms of design, the Kamikaze-class ships were substantially identical to the previous Harusame class, in terms of hull design and external appearance, retaining the flush deck design with a distinctive "turtleback" forecastle inherited from the Ikazuchi class, as well as the four-smokestack profile. However, with operational experience gained in the Russo-Japanese War, the Kamikaze class employed shorter smokestacks with spark and glow arrestors to give the ships a more stealthy capability for night combat operations.

Internally, design and production issues still existed with the Japanese copies of the Yarrow water-tube boilers in the coal-fired triple expansion steam engines, which could produce only 6,000 shaft horsepower (4,500 kW); however, with the final three vessels (Uranami, Isonami, Ayanami), many problems had been resolved, and the engines modified to be run on heavy fuel oil as well as coal.

Armament was the similar in layout to the previous Harusame class, but with larger secondary guns; i.e. two QF 12 pounder 12 cwt naval guns (on a bandstand on the forecastle and on the quarterdeck), four additional short barrel 12 pounder guns (two sited abreast the conning tower, and two sited between the funnels), and two single tubes for 18-inch (457 mm) torpedoes.

== Operational history ==
Only two Kamikaze-class vessels were completed in time to see combat service in the Russo-Japanese War.

Considered too small, unsuitable for heavy seas, and obsolete by the time of completion, the Kamikaze-class destroyers were quickly removed from front-line combat service after the end of the war, and were de-rated to third-class destroyers on 28 August 1912. Asatsuyu was wrecked off Nanao Bay on 9 November 1913.

However, despite the re-classification, all remaining vessels saw service in World War I. Shirotae was lost in combat on 3 September 1914 off Qingdao (36°00′N 110°30′E), while in combat against the German gunboat SMS Jaguar. This was the first significant warship loss by Japan during World War I.

Eighteen of the remaining surviving vessels were converted into minesweepers on 1 December 1924, and the others struck. However, all of the converted vessels were retired and/or scrapped soon afterwards.

== Ships ==
Construction data
Name	Kanji	Builder	Laid down	Launched	Completed	Fate	Name meaning
Kamikaze	神風	Yokosuka Naval Arsenal, Japan	20 August 1904	15 July 1905	16 August 1905	Minesweeper 1 December 1924; decommissioned 1 April 1928; BU after 12 October 1928	Divine wind
Hatsushimo	初霜	Yokosuka Naval Arsenal, Japan	20 August 1904	13 May 1905	18 August 1905	Minesweeper 1 December 1924; decommissioned 1 April 1928; BU after 12 October 1928	First frost (October)
Yayoi	弥生	Yokosuka Naval Arsenal, Japan	20 August 1904	7 August 1905	23 September 1905	Decommissioned 1 December 1924; expended as a target 10 August 1926	Month of born plants (March)
Kisaragi	如月	Yokosuka Naval Arsenal, Japan	10 September 1904	6 September 1905	19 October 1905	Minesweeper 1 December 1924; decommissioned 1 April 1928; BU after 12 October 1928	February
Asakaze	朝風	Mitsubishi shipyards, Nagasaki, Japan	30 December 1904	28 October 1905	24 February 1906	Minesweeper 1 December 1924; decommissioned 1 April 1928, expended as a target 1 August 1929	Morning wind
Shiratsuyu	白露	Mitsubishi shipyards, Nagasaki, Japan	25 February 1905	12 February 1906	6 June 1906	Decommissioned 1 April 1928; tugboat and dispatch boat 1 August 1928; BU after 12 February 1930	White dew
Shirayuki	白雪	Mitsubishi shipyards, Nagasaki, Japan	26 May 1905	19 May 1906	6 August 1906	BU after 1 April 1928	White snow
Matsukaze	松風	Mitsubishi shipyards, Nagasaki, Japan	25 September 1905	23 December 1906	16 February 1907	BU after 1 April 1924	Wind to pines in coast
Harukaze	春風	Kawasaki Dockyards, Kobe, Japan	16 February 1905	25 December 1905	14 May 1906	Minesweeper 1 December 1924; BU after 1 April 1928	Spring wind
Shigure	時雨	Kawasaki Dockyards, Kobe, Japan	3 June 1905	12 March 1906	11 July 1906	BU after 1 April 1924	East Asian rainy season
Asatsuyu	朝露	Osaka Iron Works, Osaka, Japan	28 April 1905	2 April 1906	16 October 1906	Ran aground and wrecked at Nanao Bay 9 November 1913; struck 15 April 1914	Morning dew
Hayate	疾風	Osaka Iron Works, Osaka, Japan	25 September 1905	22 May 1906	25 March 1907	BU after 1 December 1924	Fresh breeze
Oite	追手	Maizuru Naval Arsenal, Japan	1 August 1905	10 January 1906	21 August 1906	Decommissioned 1 December 1924; tugboat and dispatch boat 18 November 1925; BU after 8 December 1930	Pursuer (an army of the front）
Yūnagi	夕凪	Maizuru Naval Arsenal, Japan	20 January 1906	22 August 1906	25 December 1906	BU after 1 April 1924	An evening calm
Yūgure	夕暮	Sasebo Naval Arsenal, Japan	1 March 1905	17 November 1905	26 May 1906	Minesweeper 1 December 1924; BU after 1 April 1928	Evening (sunset)
Yūdachi	夕立	Sasebo Naval Arsenal, Japan	20 March 1905	26 March 1906	16 July 1906	Minesweeper 1 December 1924; BU after 1 April 1928	A shower
Mikazuki	三日月	Sasebo Naval Arsenal, Japan	1 June 1905	26 May 1906	12 September 1906	BU after 1 April 1928	A sickle moon
Nowaki	野分	Sasebo Naval Arsenal, Japan	1 August 1905	25 July 1906	1 November 1906	BU after 1 April 1924	A gale between grass (autumn typhoon)
Ushio	潮	Kure Naval Arsenal, Japan	12 April 1905	30 August 1905	1 October 1905	Minesweeper 1 December 1924; BU after 1 April 1928	A tide
Nenohi	子日	Kure Naval Arsenal, Japan	25 June 1905	30 August 1905	1 October 1905	Minesweeper 1 December 1924; BU after 1 April 1928	Pine of New Year's Day
Hibiki	響	Yokosuka Naval Arsenal, Japan	28 September 1905	31 March 1906	6 September 1906	Minesweeper 1 December 1924; BU after 1 April 1928	An echo
Shirotae	白妙	Yokosuka Naval Arsenal, Japan	25 July 1905	30 July 1906	20 November 1906	Ran aground and wrecked at Jiaozhou Bay 31 August 1914; struck 29 October 1914	White cloth
Hatsuharu	初春	Kawasaki Dockyards, Kobe, Japan	11 November 1905	12 May 1906	1 March 1907	Decommissioned 1 December 1924; expended as a target 13 August 1928	Early spring (New Year)
Wakaba	若葉	Yokosuka Naval Arsenal, Japan	20 May 1905	25 November 1905	28 February 1906	Minesweeper 1 December 1924; BU after 1 April 1928	Young leaves
Hatsuyuki	初雪	Yokosuka Naval Arsenal, Japan	11 September 1905	8 March 1906	17 May 1906	Minesweeper 1 December 1924; BU after 1 April 1928	The first snow of the year
Uzuki	卯月	Kawasaki Dockyards, Kobe, Japan	22 March 1906	20 September 1906	6 March 1907	Decommissioned 1 December 1924; reclassified as a radio-controlled target ship January 1929	Month of Deutzia (April)
Minatsuki	水無月	Mitsubishi shipyards, Nagasaki, Japan	25 February 1906	5 November 1906	14 February 1907	Minesweeper 1 December 1924, renamed W-10 1 August 1928; BU after 1 June 1930	Month of the submerged rice field (June)
Nagatsuki	長月	Uraga Dock Company, Japan	28 October 1905	15 December 1906	31 July 1907	Minesweeper 1 December 1924, renamed W-11 1 August 1928; BU after 1 June 1930	Month of long night (September)
Kikutsuki	菊月	Uraga Dock Company, Japan	2 March 1906	18 April 1907	20 September 1907	Minesweeper 1 December 1924, renamed W-12 1 August 1928; BU after 1 June 1930	Month of chrysanthemum (September)
Uranami	浦波	Maizuru Naval Arsenal, Japan	1 May 1907	8 December 1907	2 October 1908	Minesweeper 1 December 1924, renamed W-8 1 August 1928; tugboat and dispatch boat 1 June 1930; BU after 25 October 1935	Wave in an inlet
Isonami	磯波	Maizuru Naval Arsenal, Japan	15 January 1908	21 November 1908	2 April 1909	Minesweeper 1 December 1924, renamed W-7 1 August 1928; tugboat and dispatch boat 1 June 1930; floating pier at Kure Naval Arsenal 9 April 1935	Wave on a sea shore
Ayanami	綾波	Maizuru Naval Arsenal, Japan	15 May 1908	20 March 1909	26 June 1909	Minesweeper 1 December 1924, renamed W-9 1 August 1928; tugboat and dispatch boat 1 June 1930; BU after 19 April 1935	Cross wave
