= QF 12-pounder 8 cwt gun =

QF 12-pounder 8 cwt
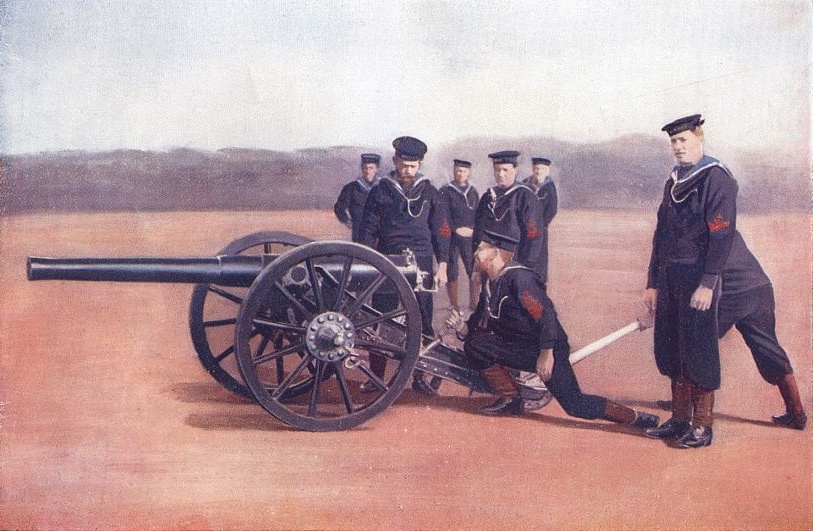
- Royal Navy gun and crew, late 1890s
- Type: Light field gun
- Place of origin: United Kingdom

Service history
- Used by: British Empire; Empire of Japan
- Wars: Second Boer War; World War I

Production history
- Designed: c. 1894

Specifications
- Barrel length: 84-inch (2.1 m) bore (28 calibres)
- Shell: Separate QF, 12.5 pounds (5.67 kg) Shrapnel, Common Lyddite
- Calibre: 3-inch (76.2 mm)
- Carriage: Wheeled, box trail
- Muzzle velocity: 1,585 feet per second (483 m/s)
- Maximum firing range: 5,100 yards (4,660 m)

The Ordnance QF 12-pounder 8 cwt was a Royal Navy "landing gun" intended for navy use ashore. "8 cwt" refers to the weight of the gun and breech, approximately 8 cwt = 8 x 112 lb (51 kg) = 896 lb (406 kg). This was how the British often differentiated between guns of the same calibre or weight of shell. This gun had a short barrel and was of relatively low power compared to the 12 pounders of 12 and 18 long cwt (610 and 910 kg), although it fired the same shells.

== History ==
Fourteen were converted into anti-aircraft guns as Mk I*.

The Royal Navy eventually replaced the gun with the 3.7-inch (94 mm) mountain howitzer.

== Combat use ==
=== Second Boer War ===
The gun was used in the early stages of the Second Boer War in Natal.

=== World War I ===
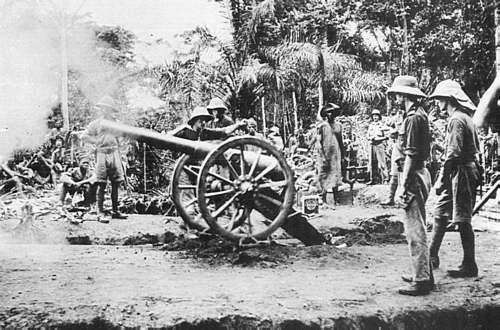
In action at Fort Dachang, Cameroons, 1915

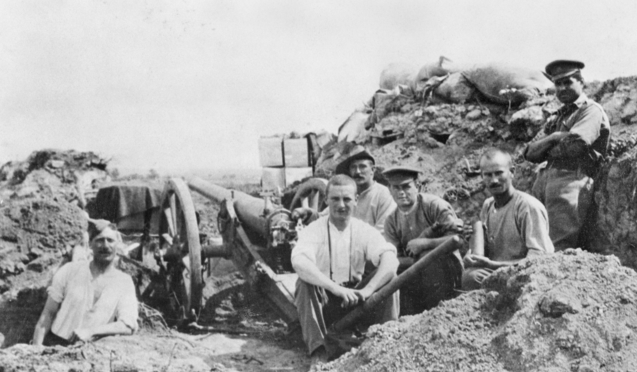
Australian and British gunners with gun in front lines at Gallipoli

These guns were employed on land in the West Africa campaign. They were also employed in the East Africa campaign ("Logan's Battery" 6th Field Battery, 2 guns, towed first by Hupmobile cars and then REO lorries).

This gun was briefly used in the Battle of Gallipoli, as the Royal Navy had supplies of ammunition for it when the army was short of ammunition for its own guns. Several guns were landed in July 1915 and operated from frontline trenches.

== Surviving examples ==
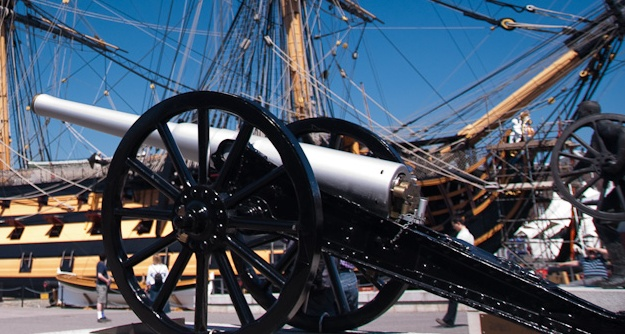
A gun with HMS Victory in the background, at Portsmouth, UK

There is a surviving example held and maintained at Devonport Field Gun Association Heritage Centre & Museum at Crownhill Fort, Plymouth. There are also three examples at the Royal Canadian Sea Cadets summer training camp at HMCS Acadia in Cornwallis, Nova Scotia. They are still fired regularly, although they only fire blanks for ceremonial and training purposes. One example is located at HMCS Star in Hamilton, Ontario and is in use by the Hamilton Sea Cadet Corps.

== Other uses ==
This cannon is the type used in the famous British Royal Navy field gun competitions. The Command Field Gun competition originated in 1907 at the annual Royal Tournament and involved the competing teams manhandling a 12-pounder gun, carriage and limber over walls and across an imaginary "chasm". The last of these races was held in 1999. Another race which is still ongoing is the Brickwood's Field Gun competition that also dates to 1907 and involves pulling a gun and limber along a measured course and back, swapping the carriage wheels with the limber wheels twice.

Another example of this type of gun is the Portsmouth Gun Carriage which has been used to carry the coffin of senior naval; officers at ceremonial funerals. The gun is preserved at HMS Collingwood, a shore establishment at Fareham in Hampshire.

== In popular culture ==
The RN Field Gun may be seen 'in action' in the 1957 film "Yangtse Incident", when a group of these guns was used on the banks of the River Orwell to depict Chinese PLA gun batteries on the North bank of the Yangtze, which fired on HMS Amethyst as she steamed up to Nanking in April 1949.

== Bibliography ==
- Text Book of Gunnery, 1902. LONDON : PRINTED FOR HIS MAJESTY'S STATIONERY OFFICE, BY HARRISON AND SONS, ST. MARTIN'S LANE
- Dale Clarke, British Artillery 1914–1919. Field Army Artillery. Osprey Publishing, Oxford UK, 2004 ISBN 1-84176-688-7
- General Sir Martin Farndale, History of the Royal Regiment of Artillery : Forgotten Fronts and the Home Base 1914–18. Royal Artillery Institution, London, 1988. ISBN 1-870114-05-1
- Friedman, Norman (2011). Naval Weapons of World War One. Barnsley, South Yorkshire, UK: Seaforth. ISBN 978-1-84832-100-7.
- Major Darrell Hall, "Guns in South Africa 1899–1902 Part III and IV" The South African Military History Society Military History Journal – Vol 2 No 2, December 1971
- Major Darrell Hall, "THE NAVAL GUNS IN NATAL 1899-1902" The South African Military History Society Military History Journal – Vol 4 No 3, June 1978
