= Harusame-class destroyer =

Japanese warship class

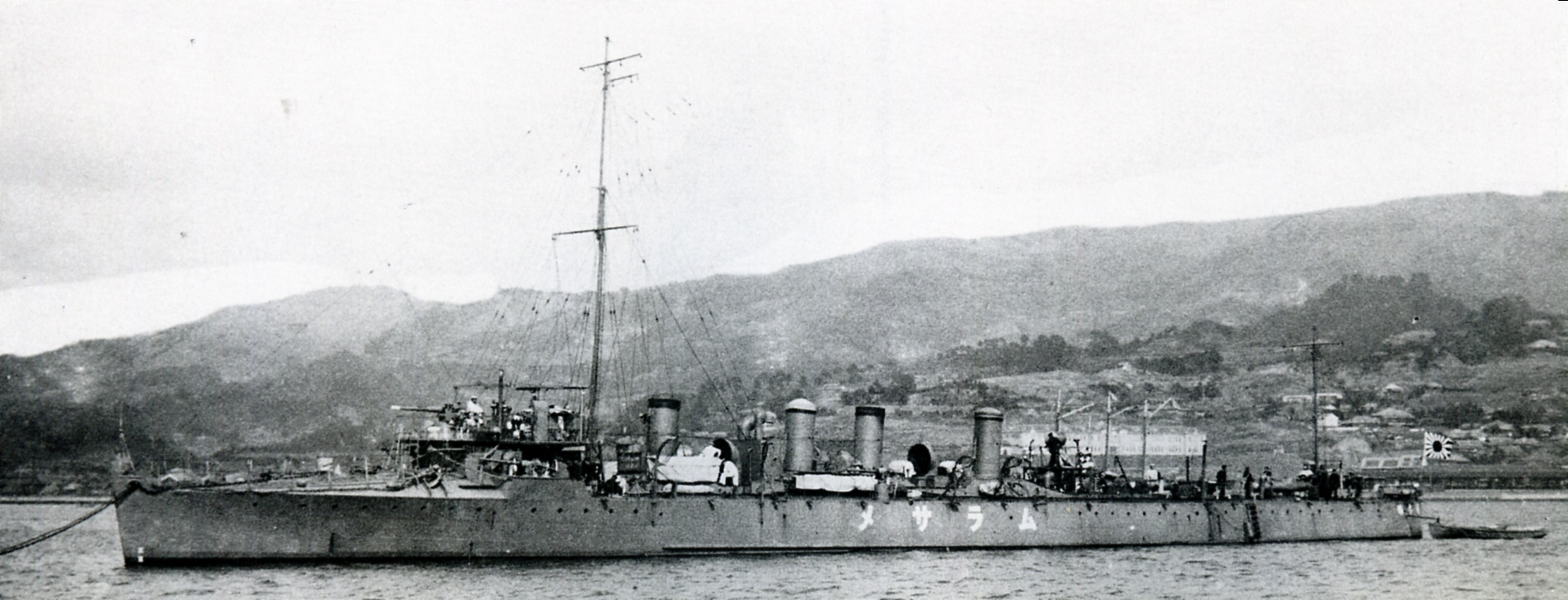
- Japanese destroyer Murasame at Sasebo, 1919

Class overview
- Name: Harusame class
- Builders: Yokosuka Naval Arsenal (5); Kure Naval Arsenal (2)
- Operators: Imperial Japanese Navy
- Preceded by: Shirakumo class
- Succeeded by: Kamikaze class
- In commission: June 1903 - April 1923
- Completed: 7
- Lost: 2
- Retired: 5

General characteristics
- Type: Destroyer
- Displacement: 375 tons normal, 435 tons full load
- Length: 69.2 m (227 ft) pp; 71.4 m (234 ft) overall
- Beam: 6.57 m (21.6 ft)
- Draught: 1.83 m (6 ft 0 in)
- Propulsion: 2-shaft reciprocating, 4 coal-fired boilers, 6,000 ihp (4,500 kW)
- Speed: 29 kn (54 km/h)
- Range: 1,200 nmi (2,200 km) at 12 kn (22 km/h)
- Complement: 55
- Armament: 1 × QF 12 pounder 12 cwt naval gun; 1 x QF 12 pounder 8 cwt naval gun; 4 × QF 6-pounder Hotchkiss guns; 2 × 450 mm (18 in) torpedoes

The Harusame-class destroyers (春雨型駆逐艦, Harusamegata kuchikukan) was a class of seven torpedo boat destroyers (TBDs) of the Imperial Japanese Navy. The Harusame class of destroyers were the first destroyers to be built in Japan.

== Background ==
The Harusame-class destroyers were part of the 1894 Imperial Japanese Navy ten-year expansion and modernization plan for based on lessons learned in the First Sino-Japanese War. In the second phase of this plan, from fiscal 1897, after 12 destroyers had been imported from the United Kingdom, budget cutbacks reduced the number of new vessels to only four more (two each from the Akatsuki and Shirakumo classes).

In fiscal year 1900, the Imperial Japanese Navy decided to cancel plans for a torpedo boat tender, which freed funds to purchase four additional destroyers. Likewise, in fiscal 1903, the cancellation of six planned utility vessels freed funds to produce an additional three destroyers.

In order to cut costs and to help develop the Japanese shipbuilding industry, it was decided to construct all seven of the new destroyers at Japanese yards. The first five were built at the Yokosuka Naval Arsenal, and the remaining two at the Kure Naval Arsenal. (Note: There are sources like Howarth (1983) that claim the first four were built at Yokosuka and the last three were built at Kure. However, 海軍歴史保存会 (1995) lists Ariake with the budget item name "Destroyer Nr.21" to have been built at Yokosuka Naval Arsenal in Volume 7, page 288.)

== Design ==
The Harusame-class ships attempted to incorporate the best features of the existing destroyer designs in the Navy's inventory. The bow design and front half of the vessel was substantially identical to the previous Yarrow-built Ikazuchi class, whereas the aft section was a copy of the previous Thornycroft-built Murakumo class.

Externally, the design retained the four-smokestacks of the Ikazuchi class, and the improved rudder design of the Akatsuki class. The main design issue was with the coal-fired triple expansion steam engines, which copied the design of the Yarrow water-tube boilers. As with the Ikazuchi class, the rated power was 7,000 shaft horsepower (5,200 kW); however, problems with quality of the materials and construction meant that actual maximum power was considerably less.

Their armament was an incremental improvement to the previous classes, with two (instead of one) QF 12-pounders (on a bandstand on the forecastle and on the quarterdeck), four QF 6-pounder Hotchkiss (two sided abreast the conning tower, and two sided between the funnels) and two single tubes for 18 in (460 mm) torpedoes.

== Operational history ==
All of the Harusame-class destroyers were completed in time to be used in combat during the Russo-Japanese War of 1904–1905, with the final three vessels completed just in time to take part in the crucial final Battle of Tsushima. Hayatori was lost after striking a naval mine during the conflict off of Port Arthur 38°47′S 121°30′E.

Harusame was lost in 1911 after running aground in Matoya Bay in Mie Prefecture, Japan 34°25′N 137°00′E. On 28 August 1912, the remaining five vessels were rated as 3rd-class destroyers and were removed from front line combat service. However, all five served again during World War I, albeit in minor roles.

All five surviving vessels were converted to auxiliary minesweepers on 1 April 1922, but were used for only a year until converted to unarmed utility vessels, and were then subsequently scrapped in 1924 or 1926.

== List of Ships ==
| Kanji | Name (and meaning) | Builder | Laid down | Launched | Completed | Fate |
|---|---|---|---|---|---|---|
| 春雨 | Harusame ("Spring shower") | Yokosuka Naval Arsenal, Japan | 1 February 1902 | 31 October 1902 | 26 June 1903 | ran aground 24 November 1911, written off 28 December 1911, wreck broken up 1 August 1926 |
| 村雨 | Murasame ("Scattered showers") | Yokosuka Naval Arsenal, Japan | 20 March 1902 | 29 November 1902 | 7 July 1903 | auxiliary minesweeper 1 April 1922, decommissioned 1 April 1923, broken up 14 February 1926 |
| 速鳥 | Hayatori (The legendary fast boat in Shaku Nihongi.) | Yokosuka Naval Arsenal, Japan | 15 April 1902 | 12 March 1903 | 24 August 1903 | mined off Port Arthur 3 September 1904; struck 15 June 1905 |
| 朝霧 | Asagiri ("Morning mist") | Yokosuka Naval Arsenal, Japan | 15 April 1902 | 15 April 1903 | 18 September 1903 | auxiliary minesweeper 1 April 1922, decommissioned 1 April 1923; broken up 14 February 1926 |
| 有明 | Ariake ("Dawn" (Note: The original meaning is a crescent visible after dawn.)) | Yokosuka Naval Arsenal, Japan | 30 July 1904 | 17 December 1904 | 15 March 1905 | retired 1 December 1924, struck from Navy List 10 April 1925; Transferred to Home Ministry as a police boat 12 November 1925 |
| 吹雪 | Fubuki ("Blizzard") | Kure Naval Arsenal, Japan | 29 September 1904 | 21 January 1905 | 28 February 1905 | Stricken on 10 April 1925 and broken up in 1926 |
| 霰 | Arare ("Graupel") | Kure Naval Arsenal, Japan | 29 October 1904 | 5 April 1905 | 10 May 1905 | Stricken on 1 April 1924 and broken up in 1926 |
