= Japanese destroyer Kawakaze =

Several destroyers of the Imperial Japanese Navy have been named Kawakaze (江風, ”River Wind”):

- Japanese destroyer Kawakaze (1916), an Urakaze-class destroyer launched and sold to Italy in 1916 as Audace; captured by Germany in 1943 and renamed TA 20; sunk in 1944.
- Japanese destroyer Kawakaze (1917), a Kawakaze-class destroyer launched in 1917; retired in 1934.
- Japanese destroyer Kawakaze (1936), a Shiratsuyu-class destroyer launched in 1936; sunk in 1943.
