= Shōji Nishimura =

Japanese navyman (1889–1944)

- 西村 祥治
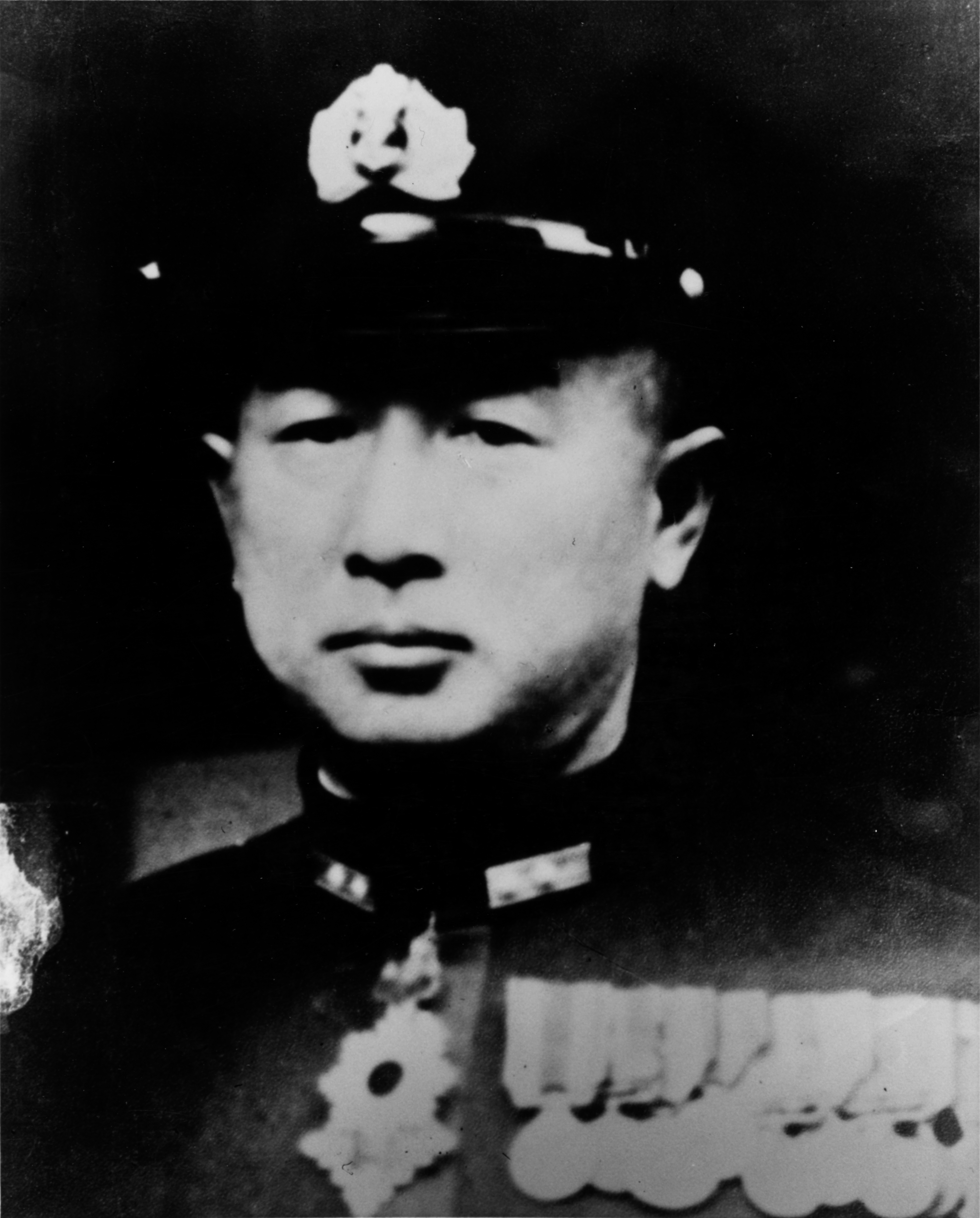
- Born: November 30, 1889; Akita Prefecture, Japan
- Died: October 25, 1944 (aged 54); Surigao Strait, Philippines
- Military career
- Allegiance: Empire of Japan
- Branch: Imperial Japanese Navy
- Service years: 1911–1944
- Rank: Vice Admiral
- Commands: Kiku; Wakatake; Urakaze; Mikazuki; Shirakumo; Kumano; Haruna; 4th Destroyer Squadron; 7th Cruiser Division; Shortlands Reinforcements; Southern Force
- Conflicts: World War II; Battle of Balikpapan; Battle of the Java Sea; Battle of Midway; Guadalcanal campaign; Battle of Surigao Strait †
- Awards: Order of the Rising Sun (3rd class)

Shōji Nishimura (西村 祥治, Nishimura Shōji; 30 November 1889 – 25 October 1944) was an admiral in the Imperial Japanese Navy during World War II.

== Biography ==
Nishimura was from Akita prefecture in the northern Tōhoku region of Japan. He was a graduate of the 39th class of the Imperial Japanese Naval Academy in 1911, ranking 21st out of 148 cadets. As a midshipman, he served on the armored cruiser Aso and the battleship Mikasa. After his commissioning as an ensign, he was assigned back to Aso, and then to the battlecruiser Hiei.

Nishimura attended naval artillery and torpedo school from 1914 to 1915, and then was assigned to the destroyer Yugiri, the armored cruiser Yakumo, and the battlecruiser Haruna.

As a lieutenant from 1917, Nishimura specialized in navigation, and served as chief navigator on a large number of vessels, including the corvette Yamato, the destroyers Kawakaze, Tanikaze, Yura, and Sunosaki, the light cruisers Kitakami and Ōi, and the battleship Hizen. Nishimura was promoted to lieutenant commander in 1928. He was subsequently chief navigator on the armored cruiser Nisshin. He was given his first command, of the destroyer Kiku, on 1 November 1926. He subsequently was captain of the destroyers Wakatake, Urakaze, Mikazuki, and (after his promotion to commander in 1929) Shirakumo. In the 1930s, he was assigned command of the 26th Destroyer Group.

Promoted to captain in 1934, and briefly commander of the 19th Destroyer Group, Nishimura then served as captain of the light cruiser Kumano from 1937 to 1938 and the reconstructed fast battleship Haruna from 1938 to 1940. He became a rear admiral on 15 November 1940.

During World War II, Nishimura gained much fame as the commander of the 4th Destroyer Squadron during the Battle of the Java Sea in February 1942, and he also commanded the squadron during the Battle of Midway in June 1942. Later in June 1942, he was named the commander of the 7th Cruiser Division, and he subsequently participated in the Guadalcanal campaign.

Nishimura became a vice admiral on 1 November 1943. In 1944, he was named the commander of the Southern Force in Operation Sho-Go, aimed at a final and decisive naval battle against the United States Navy in the Philippines. Nishimura's Force "C" consisted of the battleships Fusō and Yamashiro, the heavy cruiser Mogami, and the destroyers Shigure, Michishio, Asagumo, and Yamagumo. In the Surigao Strait between Leyte and Dinagat Islands on the evening of 25 October 1944, he contacted elements of the U.S. Seventh Fleet under Rear Admiral Jesse Oldendorf, which consisted of six battleships, eight cruisers, 29 destroyers, and 39 motor torpedo boats. In the ensuing Battle of Surigao Strait, one of several actions that made up the Battle of Leyte Gulf, Nishimura's force was crushed when the Americans crossed the Japanese "T". Nishimura was killed during the battle when his flagship, Yamashiro, was sunk after taking multiple hits from the U.S. battleships.
