= Japanese destroyer Urakaze =

At least two warships of Japan have borne the name Urakaze:

- Japanese destroyer Urakaze (1915) an Urakaze-class destroyer launched in 1915 and sunk in 1945.
- Japanese destroyer Urakaze (1940) a Kagerō-class destroyer launched in 1940 and sunk in 1944.
