= Tanikaze =

Tanikaze may refer to:

- Tanikaze Kajinosuke (1750–1795), a sumo wrestler
- Japanese destroyer Tanikaze, the name of two destroyers of the Imperial Japanese Navy
