= Japanese destroyer Tanikaze =

At least two destroyers of the Imperial Japanese Navy have been named Tanikaze (Japanese: 谷風, 'valley wind'):

- Japanese destroyer Tanikaze (1918), a Kawakaze-class destroyer launched in 1918 and discarded in 1934.
- Japanese destroyer Tanikaze (1940), a Kagerō-class destroyer launched in 1940 and sunk in 1944.
