= Molo Audace =

Pier inTrieste, Italy

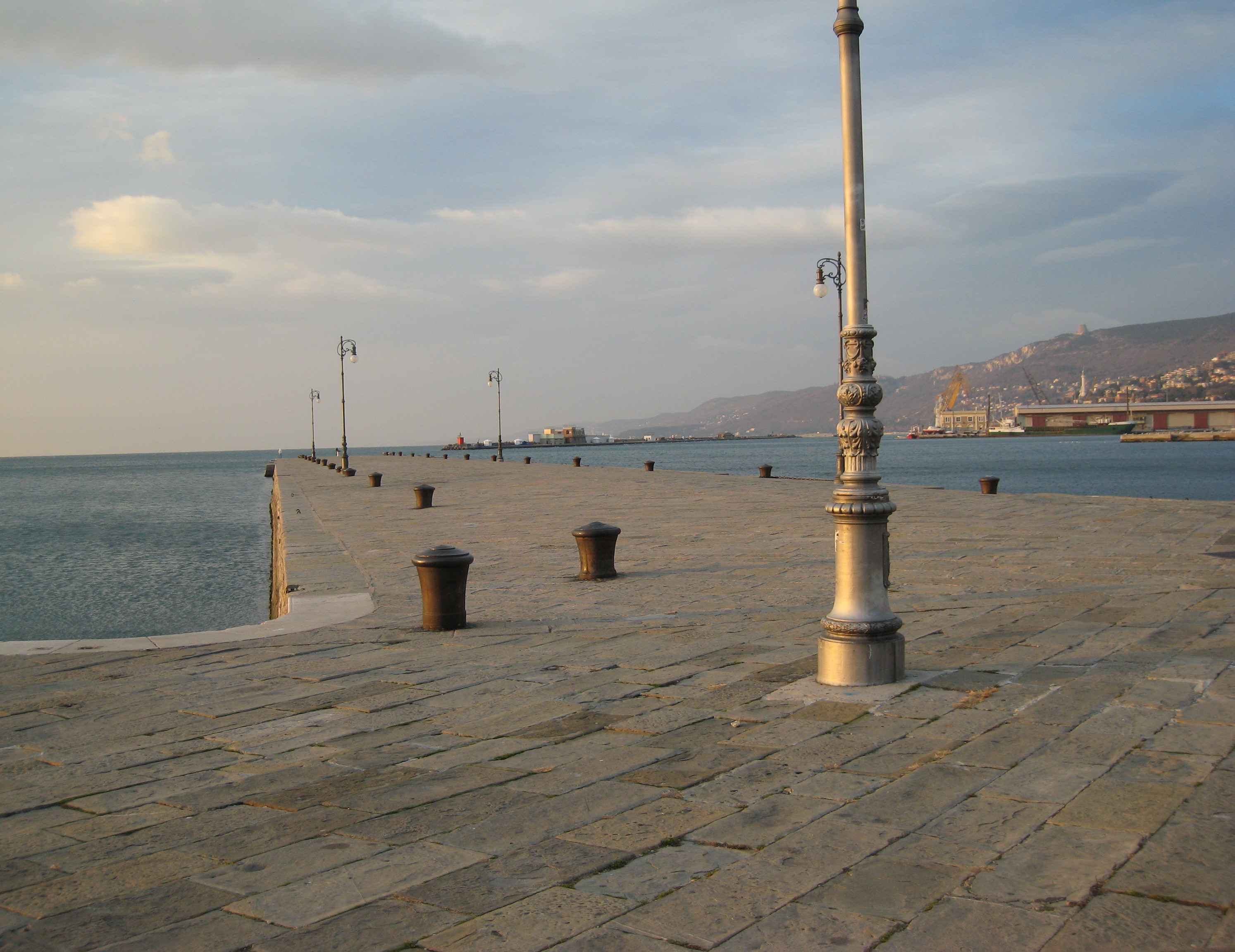
- Interactive map of Molo Audace
- Type: Pier
- Length: 246 m (807 ft)
- Location: Trieste, Italy
- Coordinates: 45°39′08″N 13°45′59″E

Molo Audace is a pier located on the shores of Trieste, Italy right in the centre of the city, a few steps from Piazza Unità d'Italia and the Grand Canal. It separates the San Giorgio basin from the San Giusto basin of the Old Port.

== History ==
In 1740, the ship San Carlo sank in Trieste harbour, close to the shore. Instead of removing the wreck, it was decided to use it as the basis for the construction of a new pier, which was built between 1743 and 1751 and was named after San Carlo.

At the time, the pier was shorter than it is today; it measured only 95 m (312 ft) in length and was joined to the land by a small wooden bridge. In 1778, it was lengthened by 19 m (62 ft) and from 1860 to 1861, by a further 132 m (433 ft), thus reaching its current length of 246 m (807 ft). The bridge was also eliminated, joining the pier directly to the mainland.

At that time, both passenger and merchant ships docked at the San Carlo quay, with much movement of people and goods.

On 3 November 1918, at the end of World War I, the first ship of the Italian Royal Navy to enter the port of Trieste and dock at the San Carlo pier was the destroyer Audace, whose anchor is now displayed at the base of the Victory lighthouse.

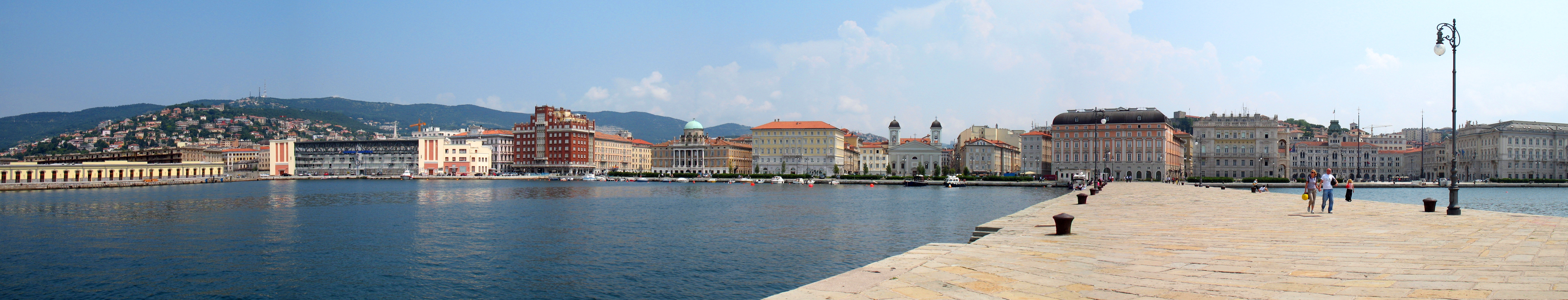
Trieste waterfront (from the Harbour Master's Office to Piazza Unità d'Italia) seen from the top of the Audace pier

In memory of this event, in March 1922, the name of the pier was changed to Molo Audace, and in 1925 a bronze compass rose was erected at the end of the pier, with an epigraph in the centre commemorating the landing, and on the side the inscription 'Cast in bronze enemy III November MCMXXV (3 November 1925)'. The rose, supported by a white stone column, replaced an earlier all-stone compass rose. The date MCMIL (1949) engraved on the column commemorates its restoration after being damaged during World War II.

Over time, as maritime traffic moved to other areas of the port, the Audace pier gradually lost its mercantile function, and today only passing boats occasionally dock there. The pier has thus remained a popular place for strolling, a walkway stretching out over the sea of undoubted charm, completing the promenade along the banks and in Piazza Unità d'Italia.

== Gallery ==
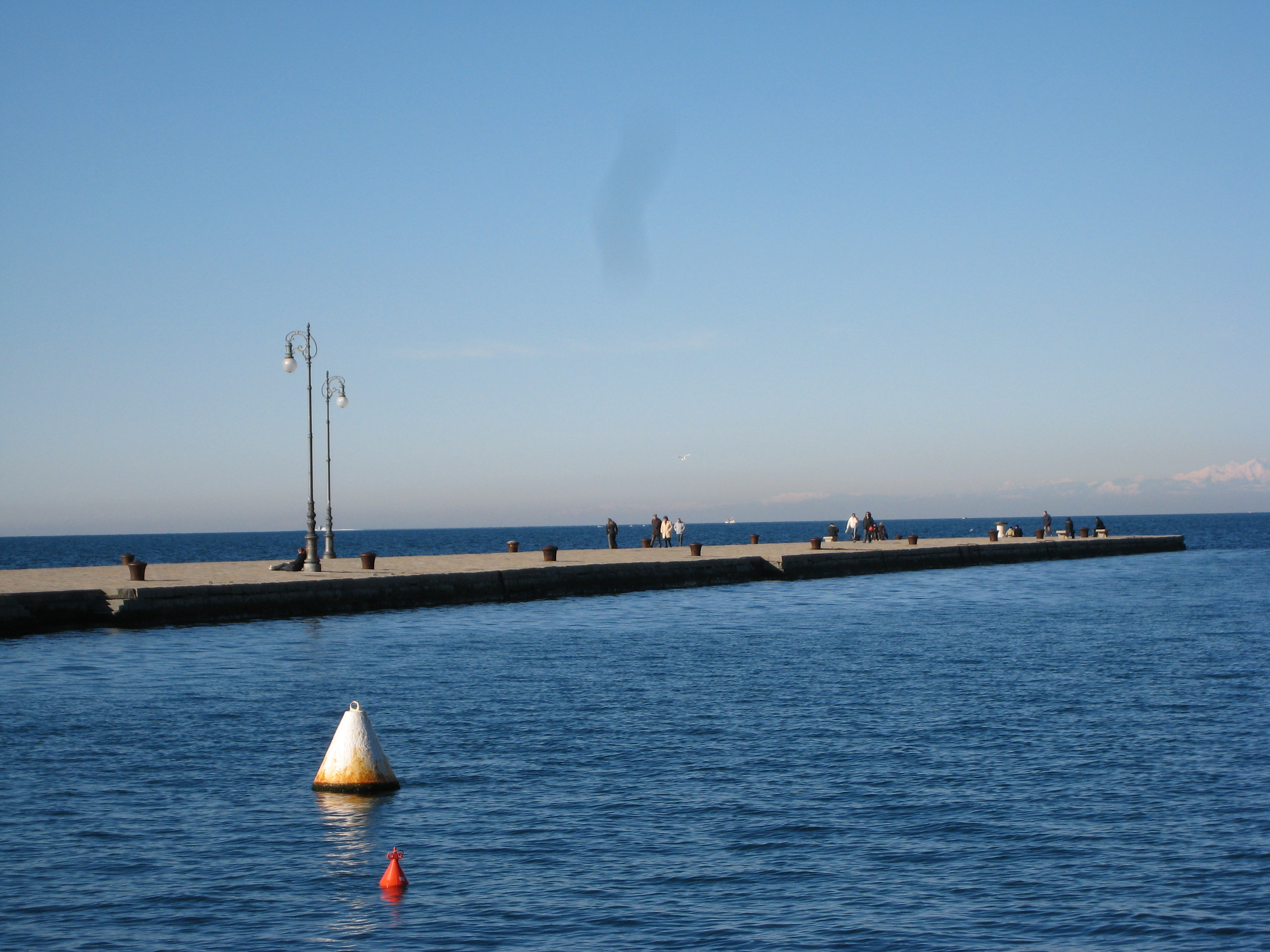
The pier seen from the banks. Snow-capped mountain peaks can be seen in the background

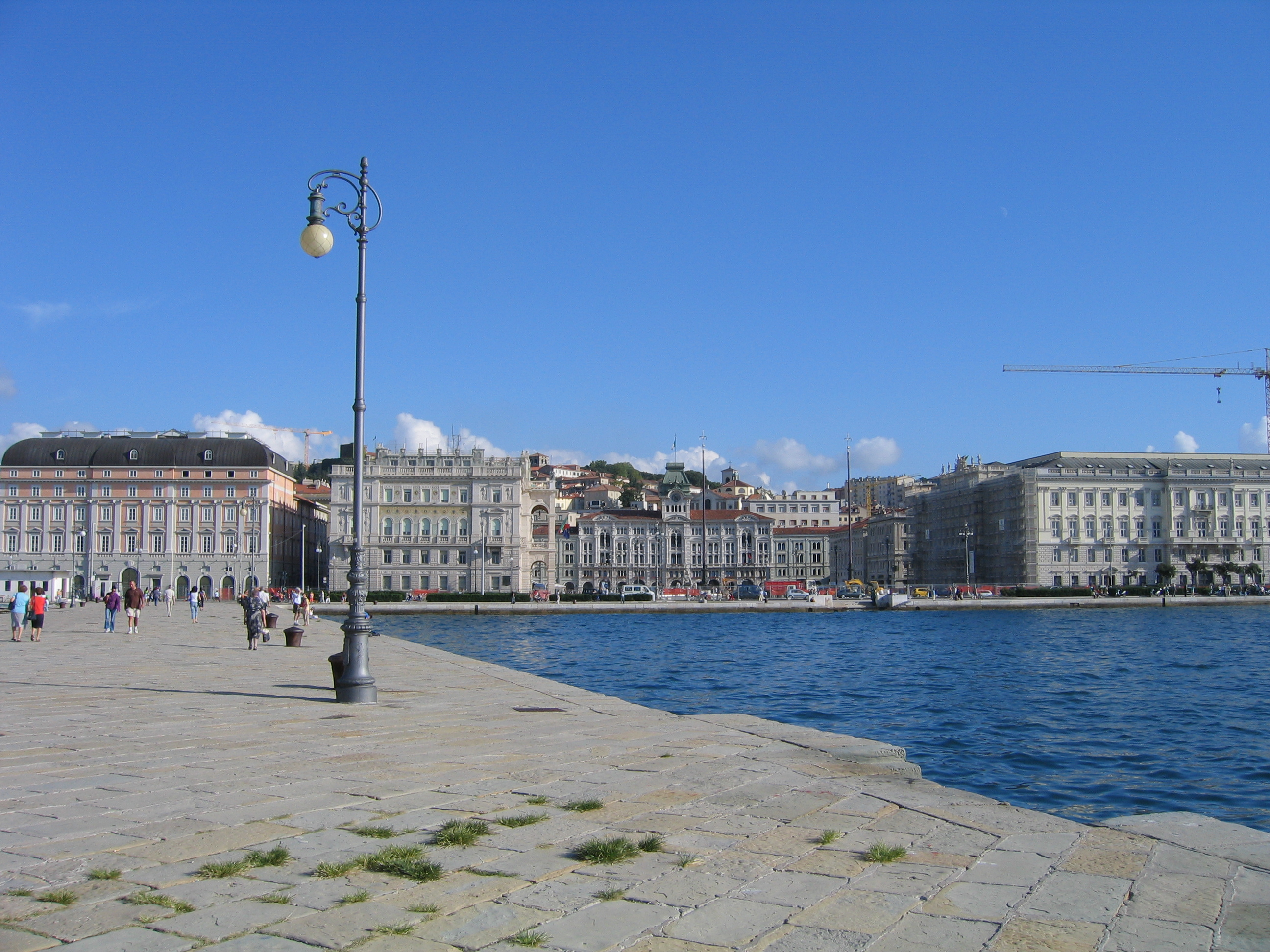
Piazza Unità seen from the Audace pier

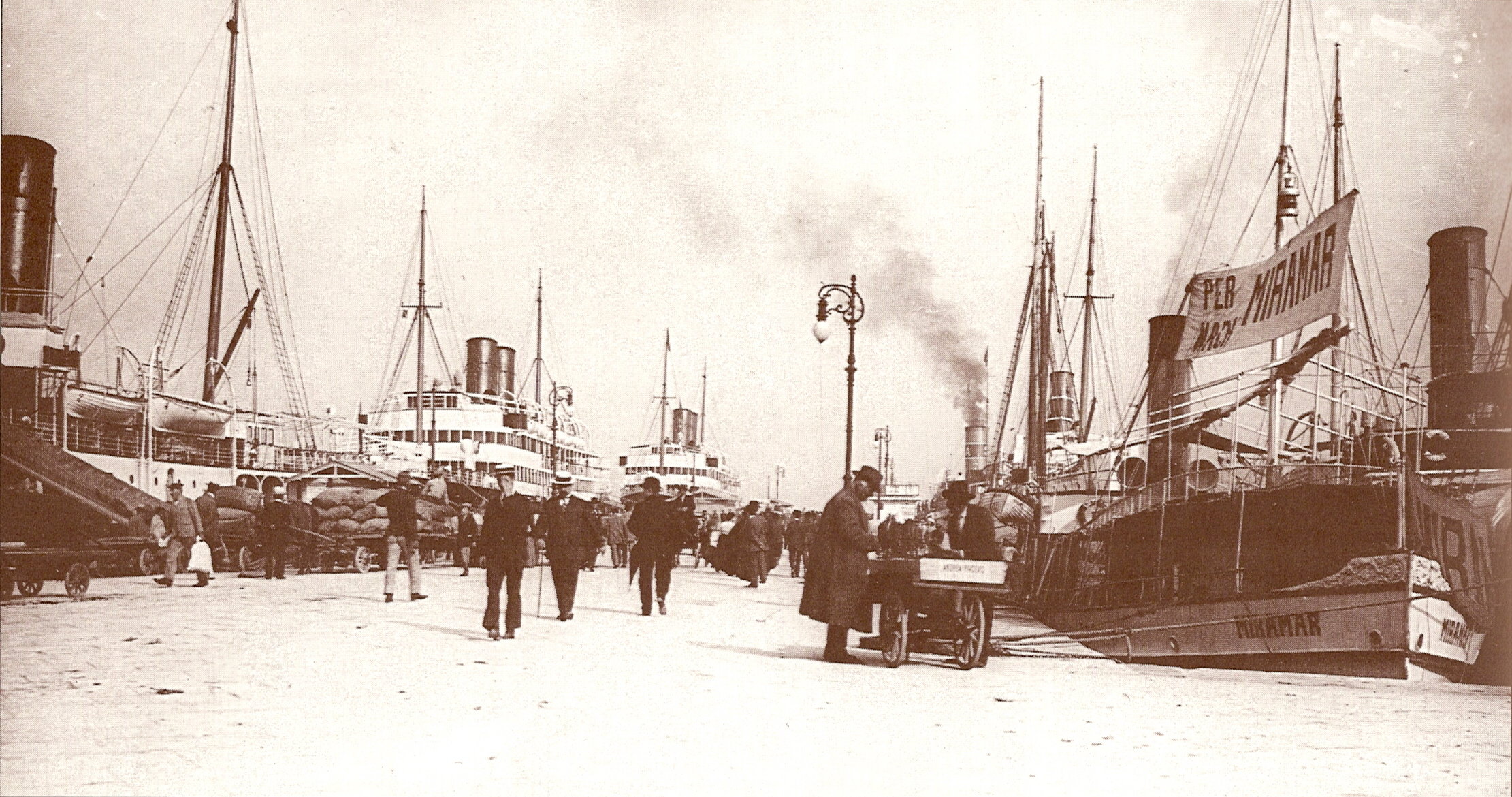
Another image of the pier in the 19th century

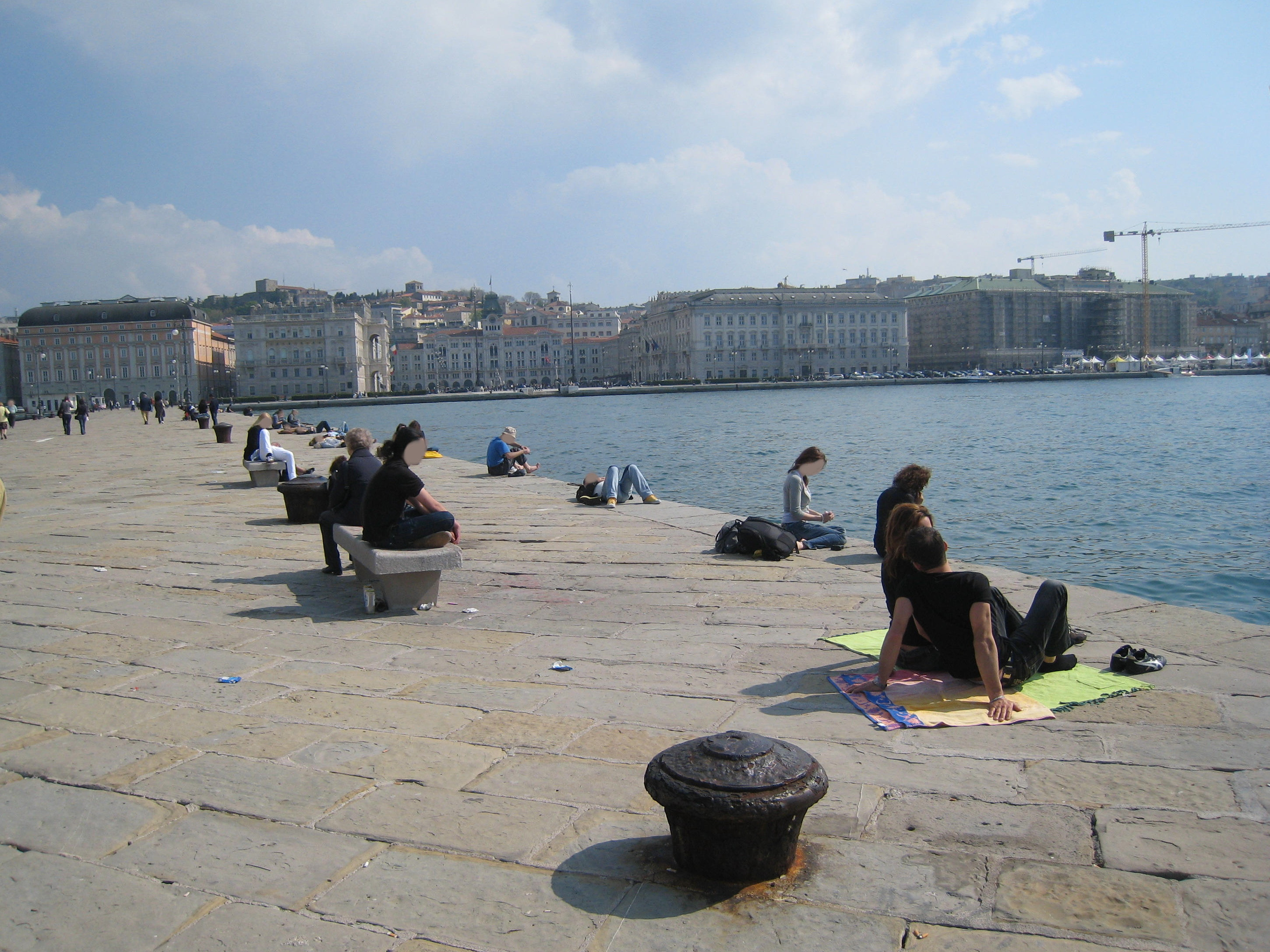
Tourists enjoy the first spring sunshine

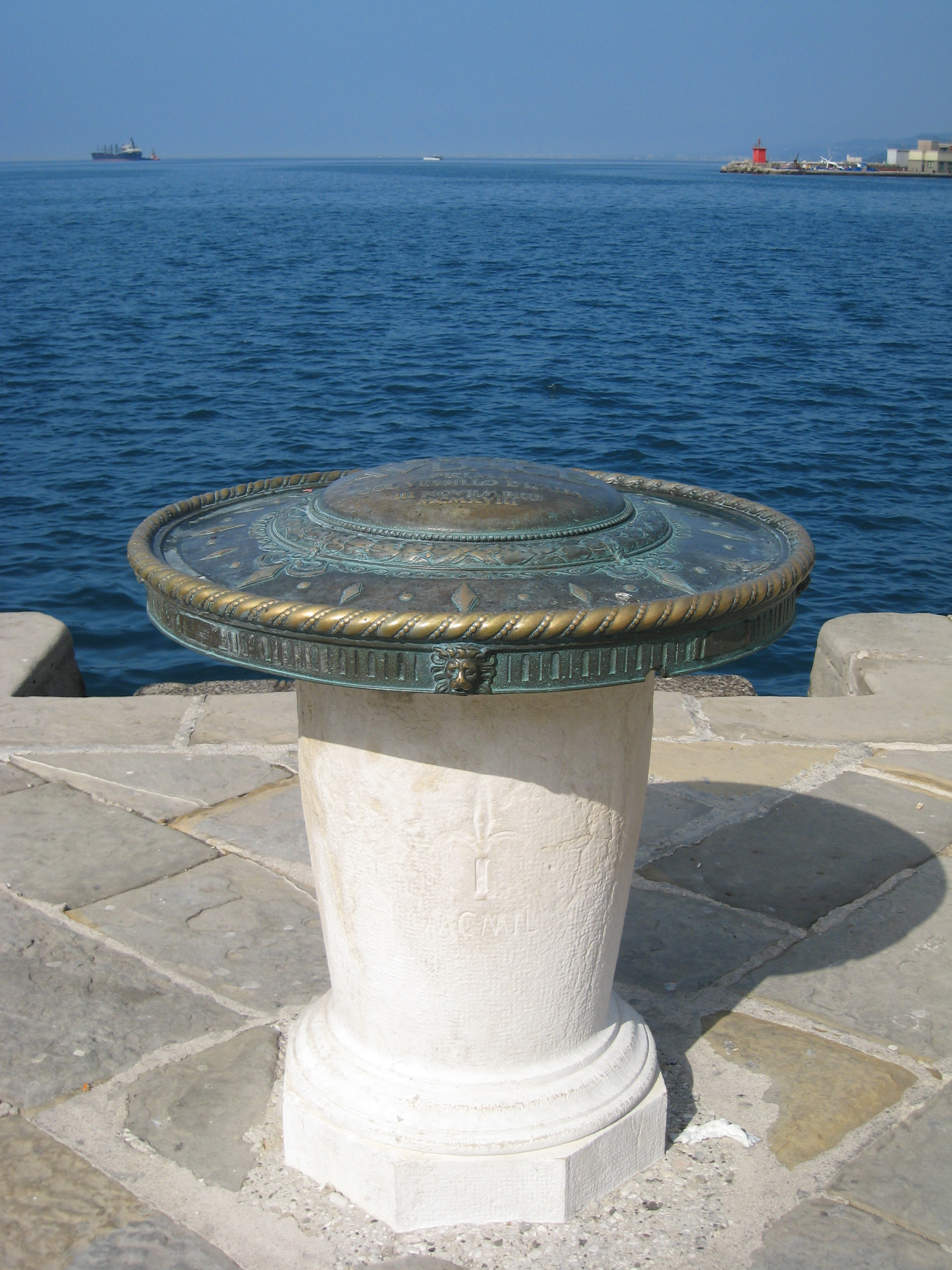
The compass rose at the head of the pier

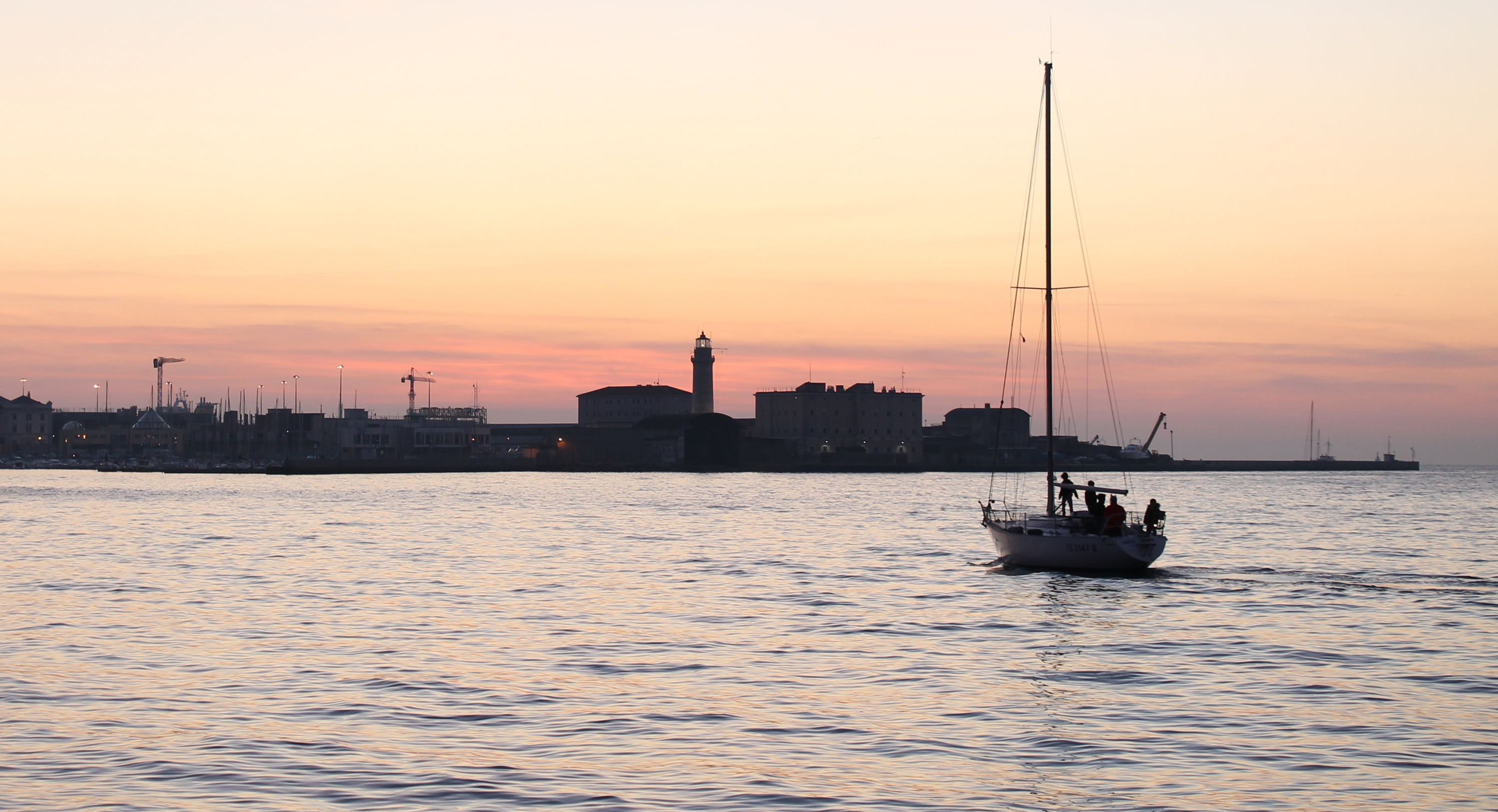
Sunset view from the pier

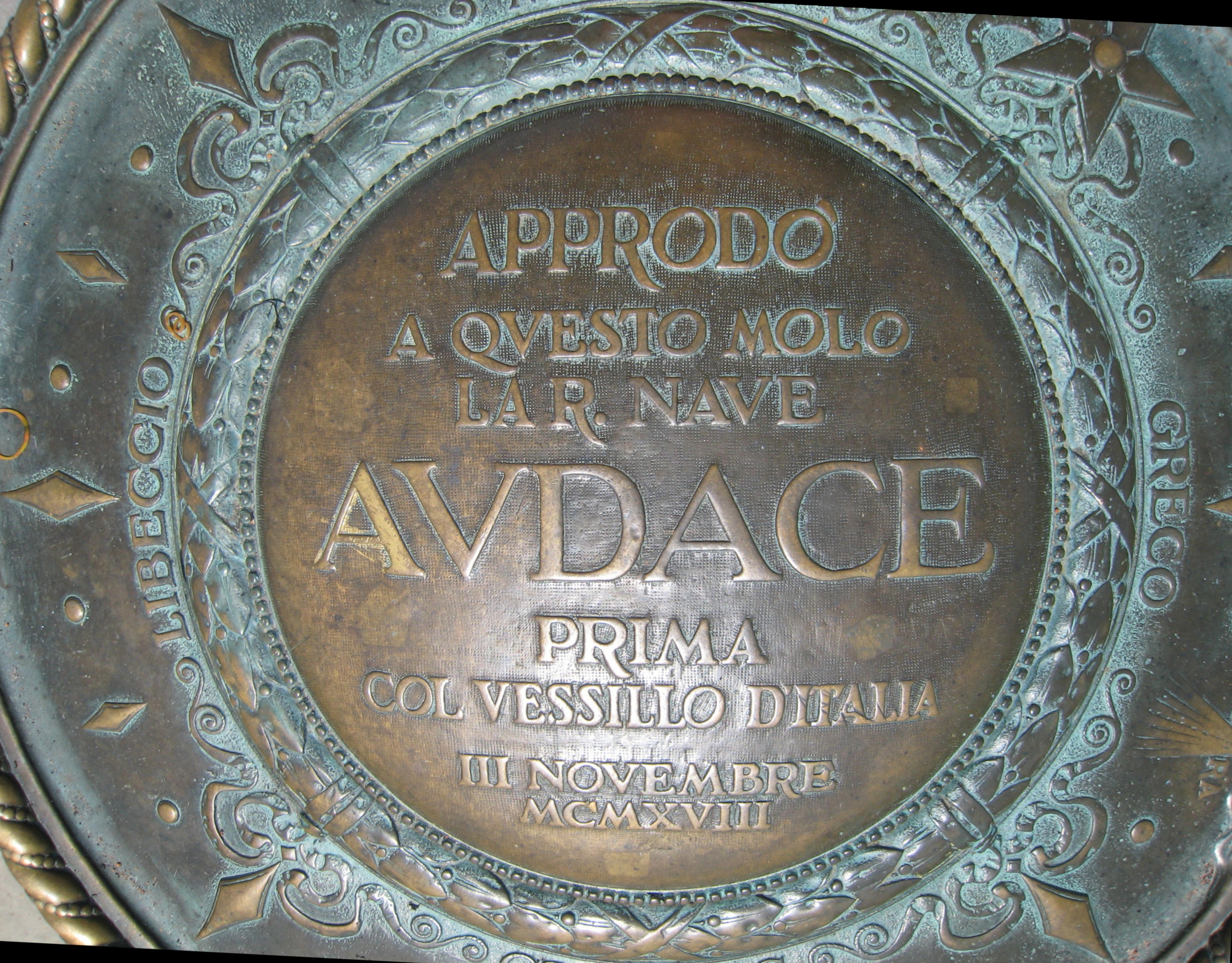
The inscription on the compass rose at the top of the Molo Audace (Audace Pier) in Trieste, photographed on 29 May 2008.
