= Kawakaze-class destroyer =

1917 class of Japanese destroyers

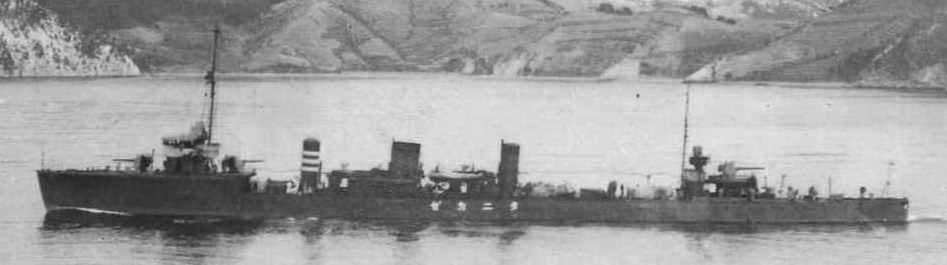
- Japanese destroyer Tanikaze

Class overview
- Name: Kawakaze class
- Builders: Maizuru Naval Arsenal (1); Yokosuka Naval Arsenal (1)
- Operators: Imperial Japanese Navy
- Preceded by: Enoki class
- Succeeded by: Momi class
- In commission: 11 November 1918 – 1 April 1935
- Completed: 2
- Active: 0
- Lost: 0
- Retired: 2

General characteristics
- Type: Destroyer
- Displacement: 1,300 long tons (1,300 t) normal, 1,580 long tons (1,610 t) full load
- Length: 97.3 m (319 ft) pp, 103.6 m (340 ft) overall
- Beam: 8.8 m (29 ft)
- Draught: 2.8 m (9.2 ft)
- Propulsion: 2-shaft steam turbine, 4 boilers 34,000 ihp (25,000 kW)
- Speed: 37.5 knots (69.5 km/h)
- Range: 4,400 nautical miles (8,100 km) at 14 knots (26 km/h)
- Complement: 128
- Armament: 3 × Type 3 120 mm 45 caliber naval gun; 2 × 6.5 mm machine guns; 6× 53 cm torpedoes (2x3)

The Kawakaze-class destroyers (江風型駆逐艦, Kawakazegata kuchikukan) were a class of two destroyers of the Imperial Japanese Navy. The class is sometimes referred to as the Tanikaze class in some sources; however, Tanikaze was launched and commissioned later than Kawakaze.

== Background ==
Construction of the new Kawakaze-class destroyers was authorized as part of the Imperial Japanese Navy's 8-4 Fleet Program in fiscal 1915. A large destroyer with long range, capable of providing escort to the new battleship Nagato and the two Tenryū-class cruisers were considered a part of this reduced spending naval program from the previous Eight-eight fleet project..

Although funding was authorized for only one destroyer, Tanikaze, the Italian government unexpectedly refunded Japan for its down payment of 870,000 Yen on the Urakaze-class destroyer Kawakaze, which had been transferred to the Royal Italian Navy before completion in England during World War I. These funds were used to complete a second vessel, which was also named Kawakaze.

== Design ==
Initially conceived of as a follow-on version of the earlier Isokaze-class destroyers, however, it was the first to use the new Type 3 120 mm 45 caliber naval guns that were to be used many subsequent classes of Japanese destroyers. In addition, given the experience with deployment of Japanese destroyers for extended periods overseas in World War I, the hull and bow needed to be reinforced to handle heavy seas. Furthermore, the navy wanted to add the latest technologies in terms of the new 533 mm torpedoes in three double launchers.

It was furthermore decided to use the same Brown-Curtis heavy fuel oil fired geared steam turbine engines as on the Tenryū-class cruisers. The result was a ship was much more powerful that the earlier Isokaze class, and capable of high speed operation.

== Operational history ==
The Kawakaze-class destroyers served during the interwar period. Kawakaze was retired on 1 April 1934 and Tanikaze a year later.

== List of ships ==
Construction data
Kanji	Name	Builder	Laid down	Launched	Completed	Fate
江風	Kawakaze "Inlet Wind"	Yokosuka Naval Arsenal, Japan	15 February 1917	10 October 1917	11 November 1918	Retired, 1 April 1934
谷風	Tanikaze "Valley Wind"	Maizuru Naval Arsenal, Japan	20 September 1916	20 July 1918	30 January 1919	Retired, 1 April 1935
