= Italian destroyer Audace (1916) =

Destroyer of the Italian Regia Marina

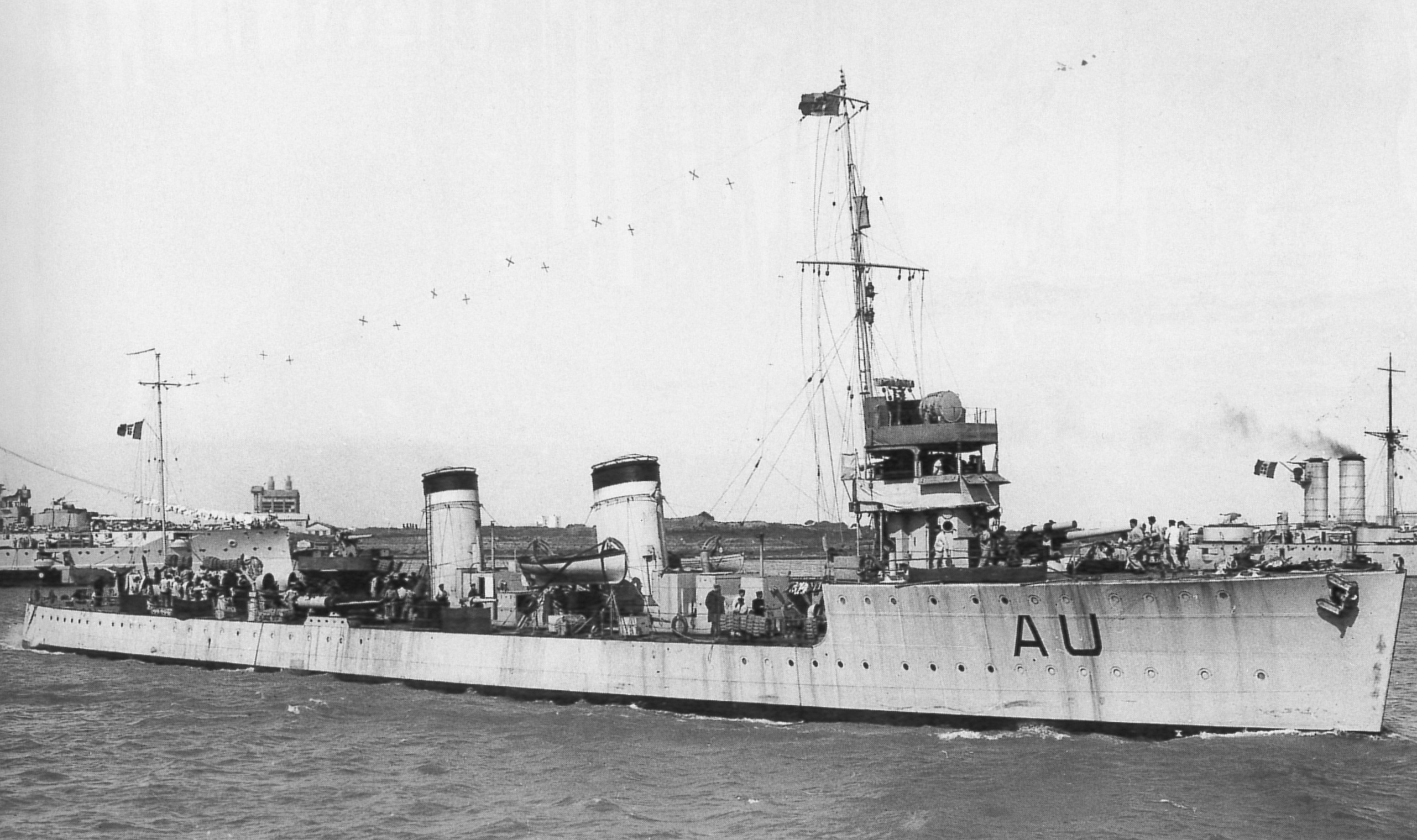
- Audace at Brindisi in 1917.

History

Japan
- Name: Kawakaze
- Ordered: 1913
- Builder: Yarrow Shipbuilders, Scotstoun, Scotland
- Laid down: 1 October 1913
- Fate: Sold to Italy 3 July 1916

Kingdom of Italy
- Acquired: 3 July 1916
- Name: Intrepido 5 July 1916
- Renamed: Audace 25 September 1916
- Launched: 27 September 1916
- Completed: 23 December 1916
- Commissioned: 1 March 1917
- Identification: Pennant number AU, AD
- Reclassified: Torpedo boat 1 October 1929
- Motto: Deorsum numquam ("Never Back Down")
- Fate: Captured by Germany 12 September 1943

Nazi Germany
- Name: TA20
- Acquired: 12 September 1943
- Fate: Sunk 1 November 1944

General characteristics (as completed)
- Class & type: Urakaze-class destroyer
- Displacement: 922 t (907 long tons)
- Length: 87.59 m (287 ft 4 in)
- Beam: 8.38 m (27 ft 6 in)
- Draft: 2.5 m (8 ft 2 in)
- Installed power: 3 Yarrow boilers; 22,000 shp (16,405 kW)
- Propulsion: 2 shafts, 2 steam turbines
- Speed: 30 knots (56 km/h; 35 mph)
- Range: 2,180 nmi (4,040 km; 2,510 mi) at 15 knots (28 km/h; 17 mph)
- Complement: 5 officers, 113 enlisted men
- Armament: 7 × single 102 mm (4 in) guns; 2 × 40 mm (1.6 in) AA guns; 2 × twin 450 mm (17.7 in) torpedo tubes )

Audace was a destroyer of the Italian Regia Marina (Royal Navy). Originally, the Imperial Japanese Navy ordered her as the Urakaze-class Kawakaze, but the Japanese sold her to the Kingdom of Italy in 1916 while she was under construction. The Italians briefly named her Intrepido before renaming her Audace. Commissioned in 1917, she played an active role in the Adriatic campaign of World War I. During the interwar period, she operated in the Adriatic, Aegean, Mediterranean, and Red seas and was reclassified as a torpedo boat in 1929.

Audace took part in the Italian intervention in the Spanish Civil War in 1937 and served during the late 1930s as the command ship for the radio-controlled target ship San Marco. Rearmed for convoy escort and patrol duties when Fascist Italy entered World War II in 1940, she served in the Mediterranean campaign. When Italy surrendered to the Allies in 1943, she was captured by Nazi Germany and thereafter served in the Kriegsmarine as TA20, operating as a minelayer and escort ship in the Adriatic campaign until she was sunk by a pair of British destroyers late in 1944.

== Design and description ==
Audace had a length between perpendiculars of 83.9 meters (275 ft 3 in) and an overall length of 87.59 meters (287 ft 4 in). She had a beam of 8.38 meters (27 ft 6 in) and a draft of 2.5 meters (8 ft 2 in). Her displacement was greater than that of her sister ship Urakaze: She displaced more than 922 metric tons (907 long tons) at normal load, and 1,170 metric tons (1,150 long tons) at deep load. Her complement was five officers and 113 enlisted men.

Audace was powered by two Brown-Curtis steam turbines, each driving one propeller shaft using steam supplied by three Yarrow boilers. Designed for a maximum output of 22,000 shaft horsepower (16,405 kW) and a speed of 30 knots (56 km/h; 35 mph), she handily exceeded this, reaching a speed of 34.5 knots (63.9 km/h; 39.7 mph) during her sea trials while lightly loaded. Her intended German-built diesel cruising engines were not delivered because of World War I. She had a cruising range of 2,180 nautical miles (4,040 km; 2,510 mi) at a speed of 15 knots (28 km/h; 17 mph) and 560 nautical miles (1,000 km; 640 mi) at a speed of 30 knots (56 km/h; 35 mph).

Only two quick-firing (QF) 39-caliber two-pounder anti-aircraft guns had been installed aboard Audace before Japan sold her to Italy in 1916. The gun fired its 40-millimeter (1.6 in), 0.91-kilogram (2 lb) high-explosive shells at a muzzle velocity of 620 meters per second (2,040 ft/s). The Italians completely revised her gun armament from what the Japanese had planned for her: The ship's main armament consisted of seven QF Cannon 76/40 Model 1916 guns in single mounts. This gun fired a 13.75-kilogram (30.31 lb) projectile at a muzzle velocity of 2,480 feet per second (755 m/s). Audace also had four 450-millimeter (17.7 in) torpedo tubes in twin mounts, one on each broadside.

== Construction and commissioning ==
The Government of Japan authorized the construction of two Urakaze-class destroyers — later named Urakaze and Kawakaze — in 1911 and ordered them from the British firm Yarrow Shipbuilders, placing the order for Kawakaze in 1913. Kawakaze was laid down as Destroyer No. 36 at Yarrow's shipyard in Scotstoun, Scotland, on 1 October 1913. Construction was delayed by a backlog of previous orders and then by the outbreak of World War I, which the United Kingdom entered on 4 August 1914. The ship received the name Kawakaze (江風 ("Inlet Wind")) on 26 September 1914. The Japanese had planned for Kawakaze to have a diesel engine for cruising, but the reduction gear for that engine, manufactured by the German firm Furkan, became unavailable with the outbreak of World War I, meaning that she would be delivered with only steam turbine propulsion, making her less valuable to the Japanese.

Italy entered the war on the side of the Allies in May 1915, and the Italians, desperately short of destroyers, began negotiations with the Japanese to acquire Kawakaze. On 3 July 1916, Japan sold Kawakaze to Italy. On 5 July 1916 the Italian Regia Marina (Royal Navy) named its new acquisition Intrepido, a name previously held by the destroyer Intrepido, which sank after striking a mine in 1915, but on 25 September 1916 renamed her Audace, carrying forward the name of the previous destroyer Audace, which sank in 1916 after a collision. Audace was launched on 27 September 1916 and completed without her armament on 23 December 1916.

Audace steamed to Naples, which she reached on 9 January 1917. Her armament was installed at Naples, and she was commissioned on 1 March 1917.

== Service history ==
=== World War I ===
==== 1917 ====
Audace got underway from Naples in March 1917 to proceed to Brindisi. During her voyage to Brindisi, she escorted the Italian submarines H1 and H2, which had just arrived in Italy from their construction yard in Canada, from Messina to Taranto. She soon deployed to the upper Adriatic Sea.

On 11 May 1917 Audace got underway from Venice with the destroyers Animoso, Ardente, Ardito, and Giuseppe Cesare Abba to intercept an Austro-Hungarian Navy force consisting of the destroyer Csikós and the torpedo boats 78 T, 93 T, and 96 T. They sighted the Austro-Hungarian ships at 15:30 at a range of about 10,000 meters (10,900 yd) but were unable to engage the Austro-Hungarian ships before they escaped behind the protection of a minefield near the major Austro-Hungarian Navy base at Pola, and after approaching Pola the Italian ships gave up the chase and returned to Venice.

On the night of 13–14 August 1917 Audace left Venice with Animoso, Ardente, Giuseppe Cesare Abba, and the destroyers Carabiniere, Francesco Stocco, Giovanni Acerbi, Giuseppe Sirtori, Pontiere, and Vincenzo Giordano Orsini to intercept an Austro-Hungarian force made up of the destroyers Dinara, Reka, Sharfschutze, Streiter, and Velebit and six torpedo boats which had supported an air raid by 32 aircraft against the fortress of Venice that killed 14 people and injured around 30 others. Only Vincenzo Giordano Orsini managed to make brief and fleeting contact with the Austro-Hungarian ships before they escaped.

On 29 September 1917 Audace — serving as flagship of a squadron commanded by Capitano di fregata (Frigate Captain) Arturo Ciano, a future admiral — put to sea with Ardente, Ardito, and a second formation made up of Francesco Stocco, Giovanni Acerbi, Giuseppe Cesare Abba, Vincenzo Giordano Orsini, and the scout cruiser Sparviero to support a bombing raid by 10 Italian airplanes against Pola. They encountered an Austro-Hungarian force composed of Streiter, Velebit, the destroyers Huszár and Turul, and four torpedo boats on a similar mission against an Italian airbase. The Italians opened fire just before midnight at a range of 3,000 metres (3,300 yards), but received the worst of the initial exchange as the Austro-Hungarians concentrated their fire on the leading ship, Sparviero. Sparviero was hit five times, but only three men were wounded, and one Italian destroyer was hit. As the Austro-Hungarians retreated towards the shelter of their minefields, the Italians crippled Velebit and set her on fire. Another Austro-Hungarian destroyer took her in tow and both sides returned to port after an inconclusive exchange of fire inside the minefields later that night during the predawn hours of 30 September.

On 16 November 1917 Audace, Animoso, Ardente, Francesco Stocco, Giovanni Acerbi, Giuseppe Cesare Abba, and Vincenzo Giordano Orsini got underway to respond to a bombardment carried out by the Austro-Hungarian coastal defense ships Wien and Budapest against Italian artillery batteries and other coastal defenses at Cortellazzo, near the mouth of the Piave River. The destroyers supported an attack by the Italian motor torpedo boats MAS 13 and MAS 15 which, together with attacks by Italian aircraft and the Italian submarines F11 and F13, disrupted the bombardment and forced the two Austro-Hungarian ships to withdraw. On 18 November 1917 Audace, Animoso, Ardente, and Giuseppe Cesare Abba bombarded the Austrian-Hungarian lines on the Italian front between Caorle and Revedoli.

On 28 November 1917, an Austro-Hungarian Navy force consisting of Dinara, Huszar, Reka, Streiter, the destroyers Dikla and Triglav, and the torpedo boats TB 78, TB 79, TB 86, and TB 90 attacked the Italian coast. While Dikla, Huszar, Streiter and the torpedo boats unsuccessfully attacked first Porto Corsini and then Rimini, Dinara, Reka, and Triglav bombarded a railway near the mouth of the Metauro, damaging a train, the railway tracks, and telegraph lines. The Austro-Hungarian ships then reunited and headed back to the main Austro-Hungarian naval base at Pola. Audace, Animoso, Ardente, Ardito, Francesco Stocco, Giovanni Acerbi, Giuseppe Cesare Abba, Giuseppe Sirtori, Sparviero, Vincenzo Giordano Orsini, and the scout cruiser Aquila departed Venice and, together with reconnaissance seaplanes, pursued the Austro-Hungarian formation. The seaplanes attacked the Austro-Hungarians without success, and the Italian ships had to give up the chase when they did not sight the Austro-Hungarians until they neared Cape Promontore on the southern coast of Istria, as continuing beyond it would bring them too close to Pola.

==== 1918 ====
On 10 February 1918, Audace, Animoso, and Giuseppe Cesare Abba departed Venice to participate in a raid on Bakar (known to the Italians as Buccari) on the coast of Austria-Hungary. While Aquila, Ardente, Ardito, Francesco Stocco, Giovanni Acerbi, and Giuseppe Sirtori stood by at Porto Levante in case they needed to support the operation, Audace, Animoso, and Giuseppe Cesare Abba towed the motor torpedo boats MAS 94, MAS 95, and MAS 96 to the pre-established "Point O," 20 nautical miles (37 km; 23 mi) east of Sansego, where they passed their tow cables to the coastal torpedo boats 12 PN, 13 PN, and 18 PN, then cruised 50 nautical miles (93 km; 58 mi) off Ancona while the coastal torpedo boats towed the MAS boats closer to the coast and the MAS boats carried out the raid. The results of the raid — damage to one steamer — were militarily insignificant, but the raid was of great propaganda value in Italy, where it was celebrated widely as the "Bakar mockery" (Beffa di Buccari), aspects of which the Italian nationalist poet Gabriele D'Annunzio, who took part in the raid, orchestrated.

On the night of 1–2 July 1918 Audace, Francesco Stocco, Giovanni Acerbi, Giuseppe Sirtori, Vincenzo Giordano Orsini, and the destroyers Giuseppe La Masa and Giuseppe Missori provided distant support to a formation consisting of the torpedo boats Climene and Procione and the coastal torpedo boats 15 OS, 18 OS, 48 OS, 3 PN, 40 PN, 64 PN, 65 PN, and 66 PN. While 15 OS, 18 OS, and 3 PN, towing dummy landing pontoons, staged a simulated amphibious landing to distract Austro-Hungarian troops in support of an Italian advance on the Italian front, 48 OS, 40 PN, 64 PN, 65 PN, and 66 PN bombarded the Austro-Hungarian lines between Cortellazzo and Caorle, proceeding at low speed between the two locations, with Climeme and Procione in direct support. Meanwhile, an Austro-Hungarian force consisting of the destroyers Balaton and Csikós and the torpedo boats TB 83F and TB 88F had put to sea from Pola late on the evening of 1 July to support an Austro-Hungarian air raid on Venice. After an Italian MAS boat made an unsuccessful torpedo attack against Balaton, which was operating with a faulty boiler, at first light on 2 July, the Italian and Austro-Hungarian destroyers sighted one another at 03:10 on 2 July. The Italians opened gunfire on the Austro-Hungarians, who returned fire. During the brief exchange of gunfire that followed, Balaton, in a more advanced position, suffered several shell hits on her forward deck, while Audace, Giuseppe La Masa, and Giuseppe Missori fired on Csikós and the two torpedo boats, scoring a hit on Csikós in her aft boiler room and one hit on each of the torpedo boats. On the Italian side, Francesco Stocco suffered damage which set her on fire and killed and injured some of her crew. While Giovanni Acerbi remained behind to assist Francesco Stocco, the Austro-Hungarians withdrew toward Pola and the Italians resumed operations in support of their own torpedo boats.

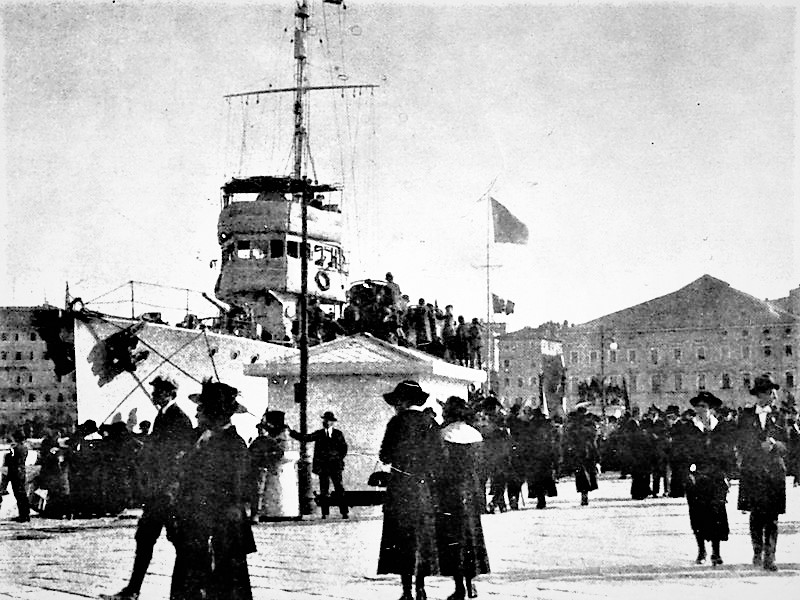
Audace at Trieste in November 1918.

By late October 1918, Austria-Hungary had effectively disintegrated, and the Armistice of Villa Giusti, signed on 3 November 1918, went into effect on 4 November 1918 and brought hostilities between Austria-Hungary and the Allies to an end. Audace played a leading role in Regia Marina operations related to the armistice. On 3 November, she got underway from Venice with Giuseppe La Masa, Giuseppe Missori, and the destroyer Nicola Fabrizi and rendezvoused with the torpedo boats Climene and Procione, which had departed Cortellazzo. The Italian ships then proceeded to Trieste, which they reached at 16:10. In an historic moment for Italy, Audace was the first Italian ship to dock at Trieste. The ships disembarked 200 members of the Carabinieri and General Carlo Petitti di Roreto, who proclaimed Italy's annexation of the city to a cheering crowd in a celebration of the unification of Trieste with Italy.

On 7 November 1918, Audace visited Zadar (known to the Italians as Zara) to land a company of sailors and deliver supplies to the local population. Escorted by the coastal torpedo boats 16 OS and 68 PN, she returned to Trieste on 10 November with the King of Italy, Victor Emmanuel III, and Generals Armando Diaz and Pietro Badoglio aboard. World War I ended with an armistice between the Allies and the German Empire on 11 November 1918.

=== Interwar period ===
In mid-November 1918, Audace and the British light cruiser HMS Dartmouth visited Pola. On 17 November 1918 Audace transported United States Army soldiers to Fiume, where they completed the Allied occupation of the city alongside Italian Royal Army and Royal Serbian Army troops. On 23 December 1918 she came to the assistance of the British merchant ship Queen Elizabeth, which had been damaged by a mine in the Adriatic Sea off Šibenik (known to the Italians as Sebenico). With King Victor Emmanuel III, Minister of the Navy Alberto del Bobo, and President of the Chamber of Deputies Giuseppe Marcora aboard, she met the formation of former Austro-Hungarian Navy ships ceded to Italy as war reparations as those ships steamed from Pola to Venice on 24 March 1919.

From September 1920 to June 1921 Audace was assigned to the Levant Division, based at Greek-occupied Smyrna on the Aegean Sea coast of Anatolia, before she was transferred to Šibenik. After overhaul at the Taranto Arsenal, she was based at Heraklion (known to the Italians as Candia) on Crete. From January to April 1923 she was placed under the control of the governor of Italian Tripolitania and was stationed at Tripoli. In August 1923 she steamed to Tangier on a highly confidential mission with a marshal and 12 Carabinieri aboard in response to a public order incident involving Italian citizens and the police of the city's International Administration. From 1923 to 1928 she was the flagship of the Department of Taranto, taking part during summers in cruises and exercises in the Italian Dodecanese and in the Aegean Sea as part of the torpedo flotillas of the Regia Marina.

Assigned to the Special Division and placed in reserve, Audace was reclassified as a torpedo boat on 1 October 1929, subsequently operating in the northern Adriatic Sea. She then deployed to Tripoli and then to the Red Sea, where she became part of the Naval Division of Italian East Africa.

During the Italian intervention in the Spanish Civil War, Audace operated off Spain in 1937 in support of the Spanish Nationalists, calling at Cádiz, Tangier, and other ports in the western Mediterranean Basin. Later in 1937 she was modified to serve as the command ship of the radio-controlled target ship San Marco, a former armored cruiser, in the northern Tyrrhenian Sea, a role she performed from 1937 to 1940.

=== World War II ===
==== Italian service ====
World War II broke out in September 1939 with Nazi Germany's invasion of Poland. Fascist Italy joined the war on the side of the Axis powers with its invasion of France on 10 June 1940. At the time, Audace was based at La Spezia. She was rearmed in 1940 for escort duties with her main armament reduced to three 102-millimeter (4-inch) guns.

Old and outdated by 1940, Audace conducted a limited number of antisubmarine patrols and convoy escort missions after the outbreak of war, but her main activity during 1940 and 1941 consisted of training missions, first on behalf of the Gunnery School and then at the Submarine School, both in Pola. In 1942 and 1943 she operated mainly on escort missions on the relatively quiet shipping routes of the Adriatic Sea. In 1943 one of her 102-millimeter (4-inch) guns and her two 2-pounder antiaicraft guns were replaced by five 20 mm (0.79 in)/65 Breda Model 35 autocannon in single mounts, transforming her into an antiaircraft escort.

On 8 September 1943, the Kingdom of Italy announced an armistice with the Allies and switched sides in the war, prompting Nazi Germany to begin Operation Achse, the disarmament by force of the Italian armed forces and the occupation of those portions of Italy not yet under Allied control. Audace left Trieste on 9 September, called at Venice, and then got back underway, intending to reach an Italian- or Allied-controlled port in southern Italy. Engine problems forced her to return to Venice, where the Germans captured her on 12 September when they occupied the city.

==== German service ====
The Germans commissioned the ship into the Kriegsmarine, renaming her TA20. They augmented her anti-aircraft armament, giving her 20 Breda guns in 10 twin mounts, and assigned her to escort, anti-partisan, and minelaying work in the Adriatic Sea. She laid a minefield south of Ancona on 15 March 1944 and others east of Porto San Giorgio on the night of 17–18 March and on 29 March 1944. In her last action before her loss, she destroyed liquor factories in Šibenik and Zadar.

On 1 November 1944, TA20 and the corvettes UJ 202 and UJ 208 departed Zadar to transport troops to Rab, an island off the coast of Dalmatia. At 19:50 that evening, the British destroyers Avon Vale and Wheatland sighted UJ 202 and UJ 208 off the island of Pag. They opened fire on the two corvettes at 20:10 at a range of 3,600 metres (3,900 yd), beginning the Action of 1 November 1944, and quickly overwhelmed them. While Avon Vale was rescuing the survivors of UJ 208 and Wheatland was finishing off UJ 202, TA20 intervened, surprising the British ships. The British quickly recovered from their surprise and, after changing course, opened a punishing fire on TA20. One British shell struck her bridge, killing her commanding officer and other officers, and another hit her engine room. She attempted to withdraw, but her crew had to abandon ship, and she sank south of Lošinj (known to the Italians as Lussino) at 44°36′N 014°32′E. Avon Vale and Wheatland rescued 71 members of her crew, and on 2 November a German ship rescued 20 more and took them to Trieste.

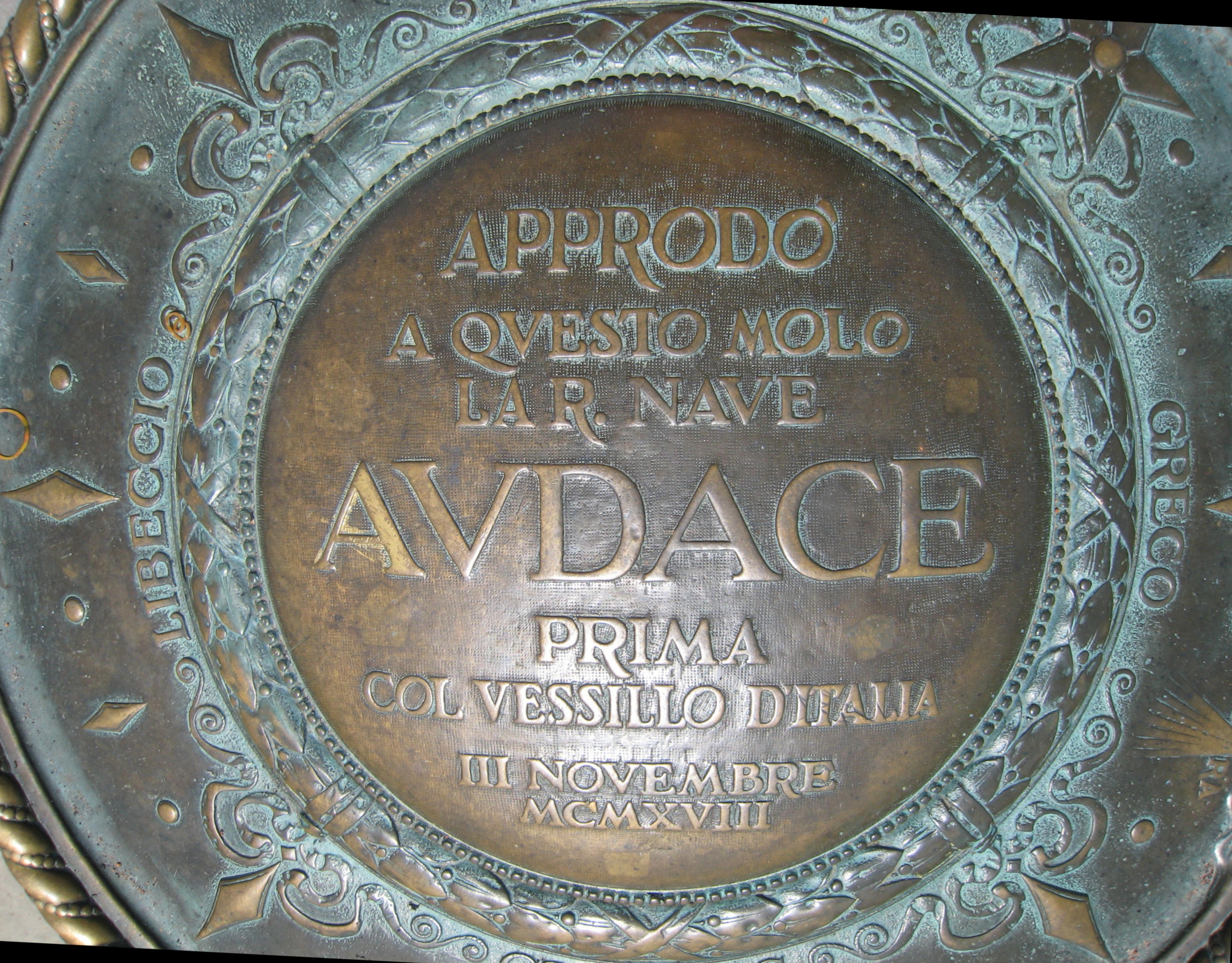
The inscription on the compass rose at the top of the Molo Audace (Audace Pier) in Trieste, photographed on 29 May 2008.

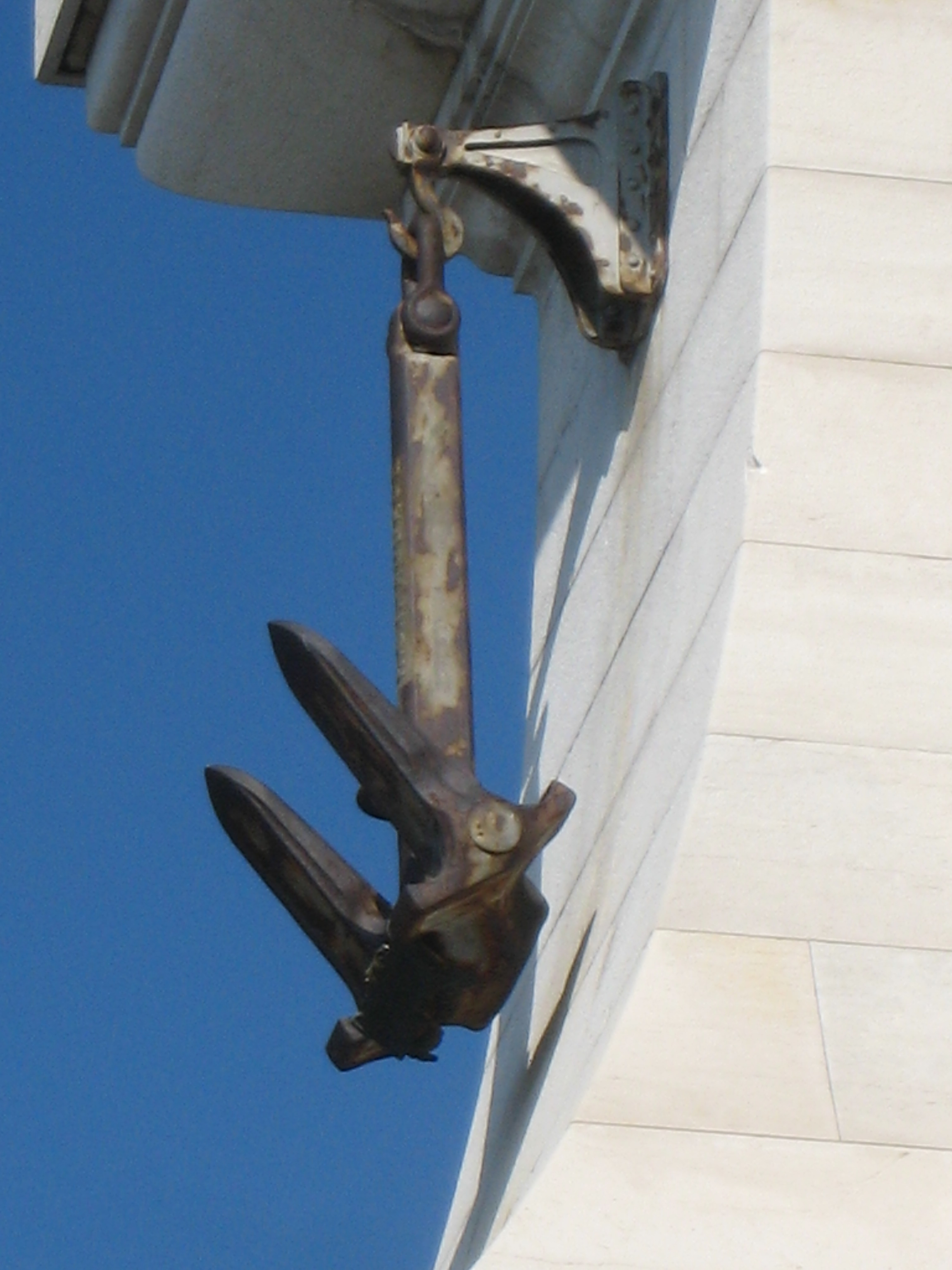
Audace′s anchor mounted on Vittoria Light in Trieste, photographed on 19 October 2008.

== Wreck ==
TA20′s wreck was identified by Trieste-based divers Leonardo Laneve and Mario Arena in 1999. It lies off Pag at a depth of 80 metres (262 ft), inclined slightly to port. Its external structures were considerably encrusted, but all its armament was clearly visible and in perfect condition.

== Commemoration ==
The pier at which Audace moored when she docked at Trieste on 3 November 1918 and became the first Italian ship to dock at Trieste after the city's unification with Italy, previously known as Molo San Marco (San Marco Pier), was renamed Molo Audace (Audace Pier) in her honor. Her anchor is attached to Vittoria Light in Trieste.

In May 2015, an Italian diving group launched the "Audace Project," with a goal of exploring and sharing the history of the ship. The first stage of the project, the "Audace Expedition," occurred at the end of 2015, when divers visited the wreck to verify its status and photograph and capture video footage of it. The second part, the "Audace Event," took place on the evening of 7 May 2016, when a video about the history of Audace and her wreck was presented at the G. Modena theater in Palmanova, Italy.

== Bibliography ==
- Navi militari perdute. Ufficio Storico della Marina Militare. Rome (in Italian).
- Gerini, Ugo. Regia nave Audace - 100 anni dopo. Luglio Editore, 2018 (in Italian).
- Atherton, D. (1997). "Question 59/96: Identification of German Warship". Warship International. XXXIIII (4): 424–427. ISSN 0043-0374.
- Brescia, Maurizio (2012). Mussolini's Navy: A Reference Guide to the Regina Marina 1930–45. Annapolis, Maryland: Naval Institute Press. ISBN 978-1-59114-544-8.
- E. Bagnasco ed E. Cernuschi, Le Navi da Guerra Italiane 1940-1945, Ermanno Albertelli Editore, 2005 (in Italian)
- Campbell, John (1985). Naval Weapons of World War Two. Annapolis, Maryland: Naval Institute Press. ISBN 0-87021-459-4.
- Favre, Franco. La Marina nella Grande Guerra. Le operazioni navali, aeree, subacquee e terrestri in Adriatico (in Italian).
- Cernuschi, Enrico & O'Hara, Vincent (2016). "The Naval War in the Adriatic, Part 2: 1917–1918". In Jordan, John (ed.). Warship 2016. London: Conway. pp. 62–75. ISBN 978-1-84486-326-6.
- Fraccaroli, Aldo. Italian Warships of World War II. Ian Allan, 1968
- Fraccaroli, Aldo (1970). Italian Warships of World War I. London: Ian Allan. ISBN 0-7110-0105-7.
- Fraccaroli, Aldo (1985). "Italy". In Gray, Randal (ed.). Conway's All the World's Fighting Ships 1906–1921. Annapolis: Naval Institute Press. pp. 252–290. ISBN 978-0-87021-907-8.
- Dr. Z. Freivogel, Beute-Zerstoerer und -Torpedoboote der Kriegsmarine, Marine-Arsenal, fasc. 46, Podzun-Pallas-Verlag, 2000 (in German)
- Friedman, Norman (2011). Naval Weapons of World War One. Barnsley, UK: Seaforth. ISBN 978-1-84832-100-7.
- Gardiner, Robert & Chesneau, Roger (1980). Conway's All The World's Fighting Ships 1922–1946. London: Conway Maritime Press. ISBN 0-85177-146-7.
- "New Yarrow Destroyers" (PDF). The Engineer. Vol. 128. 4 July 1919. pp. 3–4.
- Erich Groener, Dieter Jung, and Martin Maass, illustrated by Franz Mrva, Die deutschen Kriegsschiffe 1815-1945, vol. 2, Bernard & Graefe Verlag, 1999 (in German)
- Howarth, Stephen (1983). The Fighting Ships of the Rising Sun: The Drama of the Imperial Japanese Navy, 1895–1945. Atheneum. ISBN 0-689-11402-8.
- O'Hara, Vincent P. The German Fleet at War, 1939-1945, 2004
- Rohwer, Jürgen (2005). Chronology of the War at Sea 1939–1945: The Naval History of World War Two (Third Revised ed.). Annapolis, Maryland: Naval Institute Press. ISBN 1-59114-119-2.
- Whitley, M. J. (1988). Destroyers of World War Two: An International Encyclopedia. Annapolis, Maryland: Naval Institute Press. ISBN 0-87021-326-1.
