= Italian military intervention in Spain =

Assistance given to the Nationalists during the Spanish Civil War

- Part of the Spanish Civil War
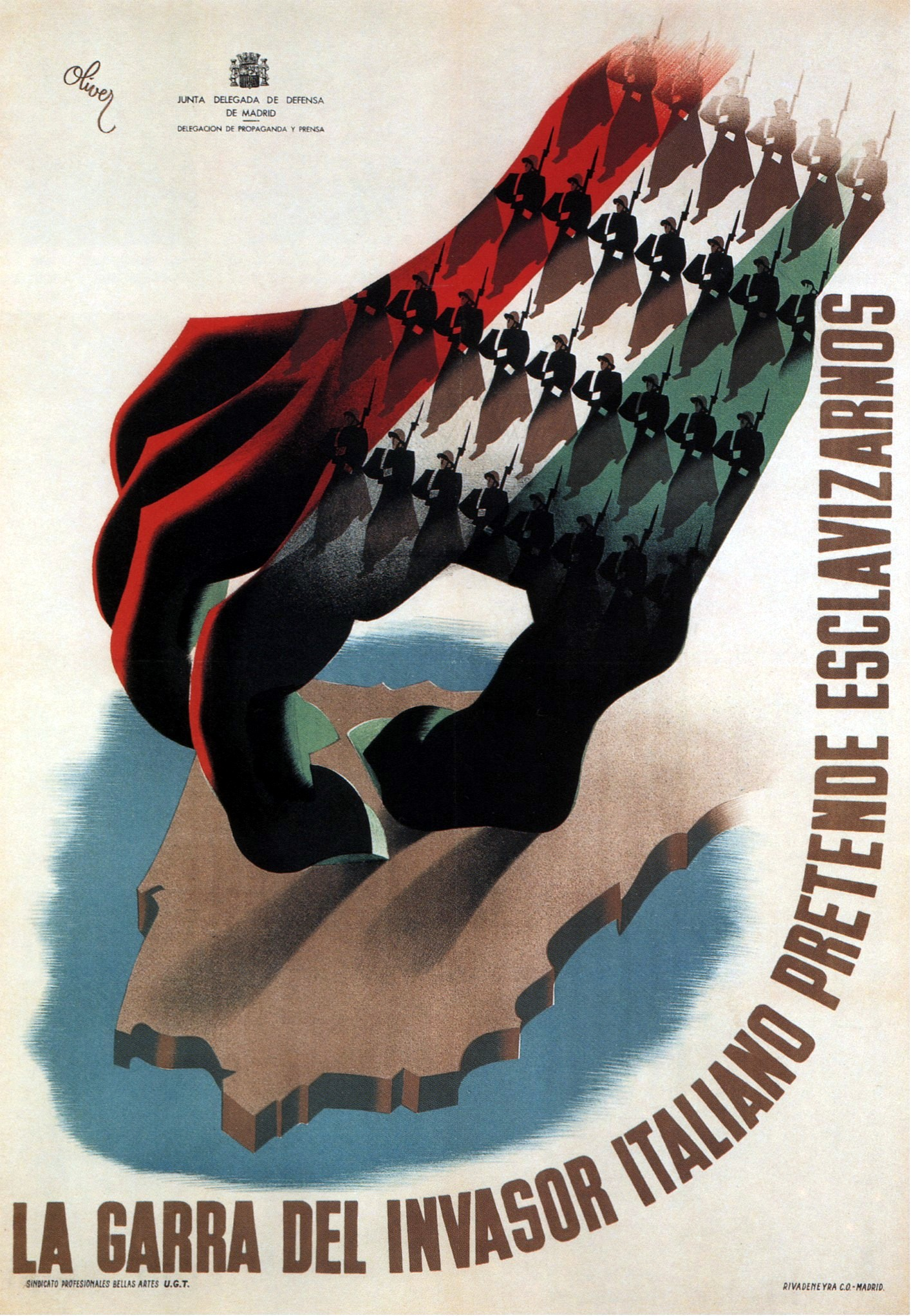
- Republican poster, reading "The claw of the Italian invader intends to enslave us."
- Location: Spain
- Objective: Assist Nationalist forces
- Date: 1936–1939
- Executed by: Italy: Aviazione Legionaria; Corpo Truppe Volontarie; Italian Royal Navy
- Outcome: Italian victory: Second Spanish Republic defeated; Establishment of Francisco Franco's regime

The Italian military intervention in Spain took place during the Spanish Civil War (1936–1939) in order to support the Nationalists against the Second Spanish Republic. Following the conquest of Ethiopia in the Second Italo-Ethiopian War, Italy's dictator Benito Mussolini decided to intervene in the Spanish war to expand the Fascist sphere of influence in the Mediterranean. Italians committed a total of 72,827 men, 763 aircraft, 3,227 pieces of artillery and mortars, 157 light tanks, 3,436 machine guns, 10,135 motor vehicles, 240,747 firearms, 91 warships and submarines, and their operations were crucial to the success of Nationalist forces. Nationalists were supported to a lesser extent also by Nazi Germany, while Republicans received aid from the Soviet Union.

== Overview ==
The Italians were initially more welcomed by the Nationalists than the Germans due to greater cultural and religious similarity, while Mussolini's regime was seen as a more viable model for Spain than Germany's heavily race-based Nazi dictatorship. However the Italian fascists were critical of what they regarded as the Nationalists more reactionary and clerical character, in contrast to their own ideology which they viewed as modernist and progressive. Italy encouraged Franco to adopt a united, one-party state and offered advice on the Nationalists' potential political structure.

Italy supplied machine guns, artillery, aircraft, tankettes, the Aviazione Legionaria ("Legionary Aviation"), and the Corpo Truppe Volontarie (CTV) to the Nationalist cause. At its peak, Italy provided the Nationalists with 660 planes, 150 tanks, 800 artillery pieces, 10,000 machine guns, and 240,000 rifles. The Italian CTV supplied the Nationalists with 70,000 men and played a decisive role in the conflict; according to the historian Rodrigo Javier "the Italians were crucial to the success of the Rebel army in occupying Málaga, Bermeo, Santander, in breaking through and stabilizing the Aragon front, in the occupation of Barcelona and Girona and in concluding the Levantine campaign".

The Royal Italian Navy (Italian: Regia Marina) also played a substantial role in the conflict and Italian warships took part in breaking the Republican navy's blockade of Nationalist-held Spanish Morocco and took part in naval bombardment of Republican-held Málaga, Valencia, and Barcelona. Italian submarines sunk 72,800 tons of shipping. The Italian Aviazione Legionaria gave the Nationalists air superiority in numerous engagements, for example during the battle of the Ebro where some 500 planes were available on the Nationalist side (including Savoia SM-79, Savoia SM-81, BR.20 bombers and CR.32 fighters). By the end of the conflict the Aviazione Legionaria had logged a total of 135,265 hours' flying time on 5,318 operations, dropping 11,524 tons of bombs and destroying 943 enemy air units. Italian naval assets sank 224 ships, while the Italian aircraft sank 115 Spanish ships and 51 foreign merchant ships.

Mussolini also provided $355 million out of the approximately $645 million of foreign financial aid the Nationalists received, most of which was provided on credit (in contrast, Germany demanded more hard currency and raw materials in exchange for $215 million). A quarter of this was later written off by Mussolini, with the rest of the debt being fully paid in instalments to Italy from 1942 to 1962.

American historian Stanley G. Payne argues that Mussolini was Franco's strongest foreign supporter and was more committed to achieving a victory for the Nationalists than Hitler; Mussolini invested proportionately more of his national resources into the war compared to Hitler or even compared to Stalin's support for the Republicans. He offered both a greater quantity of soldiers and material, while also not demanding strong economic concessions. Conversely, Hitler viewed Spain largely in practical terms that benefitted Germany, attaching strong economic terms to any aid provisions and was even willing to sell weapons to the Republicans (via Greek intermediaries) to raise additional funds.

== Organization ==
- Aviazione Legionaria (Air force)
- Corpo Truppe Volontarie (Army)
- Italian Naval Mission (Navy)
  - Submariners Legion

== See also ==
- German involvement in the Spanish Civil War
