= Japanese destroyer Urakaze (1915) =

Imperial Japanese Navy Urakaze-class destroyer

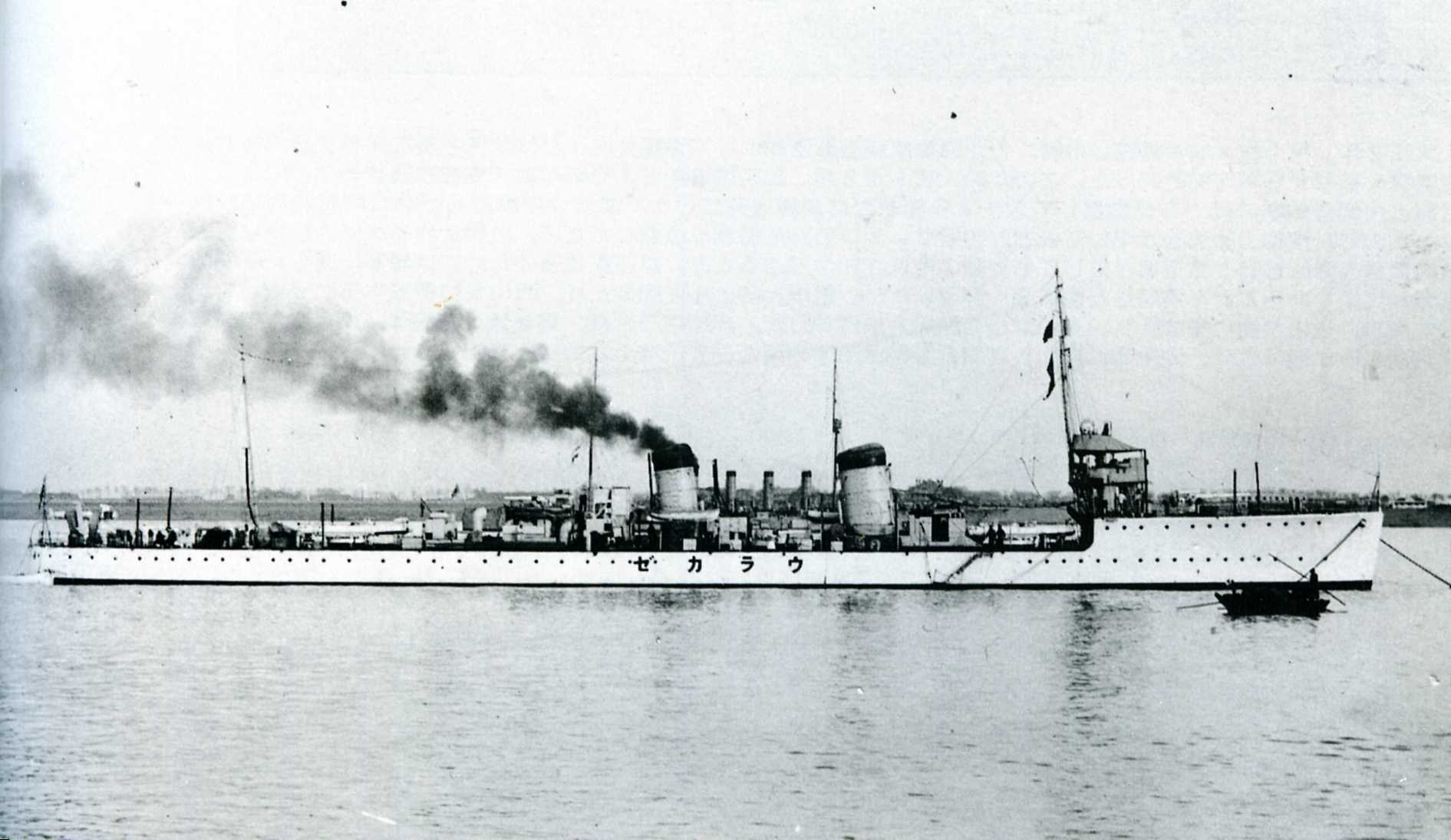
- Urakaze at Wuhan, China, sometime between 1930 and 1933.

History

Japan
- Name: Destroyer No. 35
- Ordered: 27 December 1912
- Builder: Yarrow Shipbuilders, Scotstoun, Scotland
- Laid down: 1 October 1913
- Renamed: Urakaze 12 September 1914
- Launched: 16 February 1915
- Completed: 14 September 1915
- Stricken: 1 July 1936
- Renamed: Decommissioned Destroyer No. 18 1 April 1940
- Fate: Sunk 18 July 1945; Refloated 1948; Either scrapped 27 May–15 August 1948 or refloated 9 September 1948 and subsequently scrapped (see text)

General characteristics ′′s
- Type: Destroyer
- Displacement: 907 long tons (922 t) normal, 1,085 long tons (1,102 t) full load
- Length: 83.9 m (275 ft 3 in) pp, 87.2 m (286 ft 1 in) overall
- Beam: 8.4 m (27 ft 7 in)
- Draught: 2.4 m (7 ft 10 in)
- Installed power: 22,000 shp (16,405 kW); 3 Yarrow boilers
- Propulsion: 2 shafts; 2 steam turbines
- Speed: 30 knots (56 km/h; 35 mph)
- Range: 1,800 nmi (3,300 km; 2,100 mi) at 15 knots (28 km/h; 17 mph)
- Complement: 120
- Armament: 1 x single QF 4.7 inch Gun Mk I – IV; 4 x single 3-inch 12-pounder guns; 2 x twin 533 mm (21 in) torpedo tubes

Urakaze (浦風; "Bay Wind") was the lead ship of the Imperial Japanese Navy′s Urakaze-class destroyers. Completed in 1915, she served during World War I, followed by service on the Yangtze in China during the 1920s and 1930s. She was the only unit of her class to enter Japanese service, the Japanese having sold her only sister ship, Kawakaze, to Italy while Kawakaze was under construction. Urakaze also was the last Japanese destroyer built in a foreign shipyard to enter service in the Imperial Japanese Navy. Stricken in 1936, she thereafter was used for training until she was sunk during World War II in an Allied air raid in 1945. She was refloated and scrapped in 1948.

== Construction and commissioning ==
The Government of Japan authorized the construction of Urakaze in its fiscal year 1911 budget and signed a construction contract with the British firm Yarrow Shipbuilders on 27 December 1912. She was laid down at Yarrow's shipyard in Scotstoun, Scotland, on 1 October 1913 as Destroyer No. 35, received the name Urakaze on 12 September 1914, and was registered as a first-class destroyer on 6 December 1914. She was launched on 16 February 1915 and completed on 14 September 1915. Her guns were shipped from Japan and installed at the Yarrow yard and the Japanese negotiated the purchase of ammunition for them from the British firm Armstrong Whitworth, but she was completed without her torpedo tubes.

== Service history ==
Urakaze left the Yarrow shipyard's mooring pond on 15 September 1915 and moored at Greenock, Scotland, the same day. There she filled her fuel tanks with 248 tons of fuel oil and took aboard 50 tons of canned goods, which were loaded on her upper deck.

=== Delivery voyage ===
Urakaze began her delivery voyage to Japan on the afternoon of 16 September 1915, departing Greenock bound for Gibraltar, with an itinerary calling for her to make calls at ports in the British Empire along the way. With World War I raging and Japan an active belligerent on the Allied side, she maintained a speed of 20 knots (37 km/h; 23 mph) to reduce the danger of attack by Imperial German Navy submarines. She arrived at Gibraltar on the afternoon of 19 September 1915 and refueled.

Urakaze′s fuel consumption was lower than expected, and even after she had left the German submarine threat behind her she maintained 20 knots (37 km/h; 23 mph) — with occasional exceptions — throughout her voyage to Japan as an experiment in the range and endurance of oil-fired ships, refueling as necessary along the way. She resumed her voyage on 21 September 1915, departing Gibraltar to cross the Mediterranean Sea and calling at Valletta, Malta, from 23 to 24 September before arriving at Port Said, Egypt, on 26 September. She immediately entered the Suez Canal, completing her transit of the canal with her arrival at Suez Port on 27 September. She departed Suez Port on 29 September and proceeded southward through the Red Sea, calling at Aden on the southern coast of the Arabian Peninsula from 1 to 4 October 1915. She then began her crossing of the Indian Ocean. On 7 October she had to drift for about an hour because of a clogged oil filter, but she soon got back underway and arrived at Bombay, India, later that day.

Urakaze departed Bombay on 11 October 1915 and called briefly at Colombo, Ceylon, on 13 October, and at Singapore from 17 to 18 October. She then set out across the South China Sea, conducting fuel consumption tests along the way. She encountered strong winds on 22 October and rolled 30 degrees, causing her aft mast to collapse. She arrived at Hong Kong later that day and made emergency repairs to her mast before departing on 23 October for the last leg of her voyage. She completed it on 27 October 1915 with her arrival at Yokosuka, Japan, which became her home port.

At Yokosuka, Urakaze′s torpedo tubes were installed and additional work was carried out, temporarily interrupted by a naval review on 4 November 1915.

=== World War I ===
On 1 December 1915, Urakaze was assigned to the 16th Destroyer Squadron, a component of the 2nd Torpedo Squadron in the 1st Fleet, an element of the Combined Fleet. The squadron also included the destroyers Umikaze and Yamakaze. On 13 December 1915, the Combined Fleet was dissolved, and on that date the 16th Destroyer Squadron was transferred to the 2nd Torpedo Squadron in the 2nd Fleet.

On 26 September 1916, the Yokosuka Naval Arsenal was ordered to equip Urakaze with cruise turbines, although this work did not take place until 1918. Meanwhile, the Yokosuka Naval Arsenal carried out other work on Urakaze between 5 December 1916 and 5 June 1917, installing a new engine room ventilation system and other equipment. During this work, Urakaze left the 16th Destroyer Squadron on 1 April 1917.

The Yokosuka Naval Arsenal finally installed Urakaze′s new cruise turbines in 1918. In February 1919, just after the end of World War I, a new cruise turbine test run report was submitted.

=== Post-World War I ===
On 1 December 1926, Urakaze was assigned to the 1st Expeditionary Fleet, which was responsible for operations in China, and was engaged in patrolling the Yangtze area of China. On 20 May 1933, the 3rd Fleet was organized as a permanent fleet, and Urakaze became a unit of the 3rd Fleet's 11th Squadron.

On 25 May 1936, Urakaze returned to her home port of Yokosuka for the first time in about a year, after her last tour patrolling the Yangtze. She was stricken from the naval register on 1 July 1936, and on the same day she was handed over to the Yokosuka Special Naval Landing Force, which used her as a training ship. On 1 April 1940, she was renamed Decommissioned Destroyer No. 18, freeing up her former name for use by the new destroyer Urakaze, commissioned later that year.

Decommissioned Destroyer No. 18 was sunk when a bomb hit her during the United States Navy and Royal Navy Fleet Air Arm air raid on Yokosuka on 18 July 1945, during the final weeks of the Pacific campaign of World War II. Sources agree that her wreck was refloated in 1948 and subsequently scrapped, but disagree on details: According to one source, she was scrapped at Uraga between 27 May and 15 August 1948, while another claims that she was refloated on 9 September 1948 and subsequently scrapped by Shinto Iron Works.

== Bibliography ==
- Evans, David (1979). Kaigun: Strategy, Tactics, and Technology in the Imperial Japanese Navy, 1887–1941. US Naval Institute Press. ISBN 0-87021-192-7.
- Howarth, Stephen (1983). The Fighting Ships of the Rising Sun: The Drama of the Imperial Japanese Navy, 1895–1945. Atheneum. ISBN 0-689-11402-8.
- Jentsura, Hansgeorg (1976). Warships of the Imperial Japanese Navy, 1869–1945. US Naval Institute Press. ISBN 0-87021-893-X.
- 浅井将秀/編 (December 1928). 日本海軍艦船名考. 東京水交社. (Masahide Asai/ed., "Review of Japanese Navy Ships," Tokyo Suikosha, December 1928, in Japanese).
- 海軍省, ed. (November 1971) [1939]. 海軍制度沿革 巻四の1. Vol. 明治百年史叢書 第175巻. 原書房. (Ministry of the Navy (ed.), History of the Naval System Volume 4-1, Meiji Centennial History Series, Volume 175, Hara Shobo, November 1971 (original 1939) (in Japanese)).
- 海軍省, ed. (October 1971) [1941]. 海軍制度沿革 巻八. Vol. 明治百年史叢書 第180巻. 原書房. (Ministry of the Navy (ed.), History of the Naval System Volume 8, Meiji Centennial History Series Volume 180, Hara Shobo, October 1971 (original 1941) (in Japanese)).
- 海軍省, ed. (April 1972) [1940]. 海軍制度沿革 巻十の1. Vol. 明治百年史叢書 第182巻. 原書房. (Ministry of the Navy (ed.), History of the Naval System Volume 10, Volume 182 of the Meiji Centennial History Series, Hara Shobo, April 1972 (original 1940) (in Japanese)).
- 海軍省, ed. (May 1972) [1941]. 海軍制度沿革 巻十一の2. Vol. 明治百年史叢書 第185巻. 原書房. (Ministry of the Navy (ed.), History of the Naval System Volume 11-2, Meiji Centennial History Series, Volume 185, Hara Shobo, May 1972 (original 1941) (in Japanese)).
- 海軍歴史保存会『日本海軍史』第7巻、第9巻、第10巻（第一法規出版、1995年）。
- 呉市海事歴史科学館, ed. (2005). 日本海軍艦艇写真集 駆逐艦. ダイヤモンド社. ISBN 4-478-95060-1. (Naval History Preservation Society "Japanese Naval History" Volumes 7, 9, and 10 (Daiichi Hoki Publishing, 1995) (in Japanese)).
- (社)日本造船学会, ed. (1981) [October 1977-10]. 昭和造船史(第1巻). Vol. 明治百年史叢書 第207巻 (第3版 ed.). 原書房. ISBN 4-562-00302-2.(Kure City Maritime History and Science Museum, ed., “Photo Collection of Japanese Navy Ships: Destroyers”, Diamond Publishing, 2005. ISBN 4-478-95060-1 (in Japanese)).
- 日本舶用機関史編集委員会, ed. (November 1975). 帝国海軍機関史. Vol. 明治百年史叢書 第245巻. 原書房. (EJapan Society of Naval Architects (ed.), Showa Shipbuilding History (Volume 1), Meiji Centennial History Series, Volume 207 (3rd edition), Hara Shobo, 1981 (original October 1977). ISBN 4-562-00302-2 (in Japanese)).
- 福井静夫 (January 2011) [1961]. 終戦と帝国艦艇 わが海軍の終焉と艦艇の帰趨. 光人社. ISBN 978-4-7698-1488-7."History of Imperial Naval Engines" edited by the Japanese Marine Engine History Editorial Committee, Meiji Centennial History Series, Volume 245, Hara Shobo, November 1975 (in Japanese)).
- 福井静夫 (1993). 日本駆逐艦物語. Vol. 福井静夫著作集第5巻. 光人社. ISBN 4-7698-0611-6. (Shizuo Fukui, “The End of the War and Imperial Ships : The End of Our Navy and the Future of Ships ,” Kojinsha, January 2011 (original 1961). ISBN 978-4-7698-1488-7 (in Japanese)).
- 福井静夫 (1994). 写真 日本海軍全艦艇史. ベストセラーズ. ISBN 4-584-17054-1. (Shizuo Fukui, “Japanese Destroyer Story”, Shizuo Fukui Collected Works Volume 5, Kojinsha, 1993. ISBN 4-7698-0611-6 (in Japanese)).
- 防衛庁防衛研修所戦史室 (1969). 海軍軍戦備＜1＞ 昭和十六年十一月まで. Vol. 戦史叢書第31巻. 朝雲新聞社. (Shizuo Fukui, “Photograph History of All Japanese Navy Ships,” Bestsellers, 1994. ISBN 4-584-17054-1 (in Japanese)).
- 横須賀海軍工廠, ed. (July 1983) [1935]. 横須賀海軍工廠史(2). Vol. 明治百年史叢書 第330巻. 原書房. ISBN 4-562-01379-6. (Yokosuka Naval Arsenal (ed.). “Yokosuka Naval Arsenal History (2)” Meiji Centennial History Series Volume 330, Hara Shobo, July 1983 (original 1935). ISBN 4-562-01379-6 (in Japanese)).
- 『官報』("Official Gazette") (in Japanese)
- アジア歴史資料センター公式サイト（防衛省防衛研究所）] (Asian Historical Records Center Official Website ( Ministry of Defense Research Institute (in Japanese)).])
  - 各国へ軍艦建造並二購入方交渉雑件／英国 第三巻/5.駆逐艦江風浦風. Ref.B07090362200.（日本国外務省外交史料館）("Miscellaneous matters related to warship construction and purchase negotiations for various countries/Britain Volume 3/5. Destroyer Efuura Kaze". Ref.B07090362200. Japanese Ministry of Foreign Affairs Diplomatic Archives (in Japanese))
  - 大正3年 公文備考 巻15 艦船1/ヤロー内火式駆逐艦関係(3). Ref.C08020401900. ("Taisho 3 Kumon Notes Volume 15 Ships 1/Yarrow Internal Fire Destroyer Related (3)". Ref.C08020401900 (in Japanese)).
  - 大正4年 公文備考 巻44 艦船4/試験(1). Ref.C08020603800. ("Taisho 4 Kumon Notes Volume 44 Ship 4/Examination (1)". Ref.C08020603800 (in Japanese),
  - 大正4年 公文備考 巻58 艦船18/浦風回航記事(1). Ref.C08020627700. ("Taisho 4 Kumon Notes Volume 58 Ship 18/Urakaze Sailing Article (1)". Ref.C08020627700 (in Japanese)).
  - 大正4年 公文備考 巻58 艦船18/浦風回航記事(2). Ref.C08020627800. ("Taisho 4 Kumon Notes Volume 58 Ship 18/Urakaze Sailing Article (2)". Ref.C08020627800 (in Japanese))
  - 大正5年 公文備考 巻26 艦船3/装備、備付. Ref.C08020764400. ("Taisho 5 Kumon Notes Volume 26 Ships 3/Equipment, Supplies". Ref.C08020764400 (in Japanese)).
  - 大正7年 公文備考 巻20 艦船1/駆逐艦浦風、江風、製造(1). Ref.C08021104400. ("Taisho 7 Kumon Notes Volume 20 Ship 1/Destroyer Urakaze, Ekaze, Manufacture (1)". Ref.C08021104400 (in Japanese)).
  - 大正7年 公文備考 巻22 艦船3/付属換(2). Ref.C08021107300. ("Taisho 7 Kumon Notes Volume 22 Ship 3/Attachment Replacement (2)". Ref.C08021107300 (in Japanese)).
  - 大正8年 公文備考 巻20 艦船3/試験(1). Ref.C08021314300. (“Taisho 8 Kumon Notes Volume 20 Ship 3/Examination (1)”. Ref.C08021314300 (in Japanese)).
  - 公文備考 昭和11年 F 艦船 巻8/佐鎮第21号 11.5.28 除籍艦船廃艦処分に関する件. Ref.C05034964300. ("Kubun Notes 1933 F Ships Volume 8/Sachin No. 21 11.5.28 Matters regarding the scrapping of deregistered ships." Ref.C05034964300 (in Japanese)).
  - 昭和14年 達 完/11月. Ref.C12070106100. (Showa 14 Completed/November. Ref.C12070106100 (in Japanese)).
