= Japanese destroyer Kawakaze (1917) =

Destroyer of the Imperial Japanese Navy

History

Empire of Japan
- Name: Kawakaze
- Builder: Yokosuka Naval Arsenal
- Launched: 10 October 1917
- Completed: 11 November 1918
- Decommissioned: 1 April 1934
- Fate: Scrapped, 1934

General characteristics
- Class & type: Kawakaze-class destroyer
- Displacement: 1,300 long tons (1,300 t) (normal); 1,580 long tons (1,610 t) (full load)
- Length: 320 ft (97.5 m) (pp); 336 ft 6 in (102.6 m) (o/a)
- Beam: 29 ft (8.8 m)
- Draught: 9 ft 3 in (2.8 m)
- Installed power: 4 water-tube boilers; 34,000 shp (25,000 kW)
- Propulsion: 2 shafts; 2 geared steam turbines
- Speed: 37.5 knots (69.5 km/h; 43.2 mph)
- Range: 4,000 nmi (7,400 km; 4,600 mi) at 15 knots (28 km/h; 17 mph)
- Complement: 128
- Armament: 3 × single 12 cm (4.7 in) guns; 3 × twin 533 mm (21 in) torpedo tubes

Kawakaze (江風, Inlet Wind) was the lead ship of her class of two destroyers built for the Imperial Japanese Navy (IJN) during World War I.

== Design and description ==
The Kawakaze-class destroyers were enlarged and faster versions of the preceding Isokaze class with a more powerful armament. They displaced 1,300 long tons (1,300 t) at normal load and 1,580 long tons (1,610 t) at deep load. The ships had a length between perpendiculars of 320 feet (97.5 m) and a overall length of 336 feet 6 inches (102.6 m), a beam of 29 feet (8.8 m) and a draught of 9 feet 3 inches (2.8 m). Kawakaze was powered by two Parsons geared steam turbines, each driving one shaft using steam produced by four Type Ro Kampon water-tube boilers. The engines produced a total of 34,000 shaft horsepower (25,000 kW) that gave the ships a maximum speed of 37.5 knots (69.5 km/h; 43.2 mph). They carried enough fuel oil to give them a range of 4,000 nautical miles (7,400 km; 4,600 mi) at a speed of 15 knots (28 km/h; 17 mph). Their crew consisted of 128 officers and ratings.

The main armament of the Kawakaze-class ships consisted of three quick-firing (QF) 12-centimetre (4.7 in) guns; one gun each was located at the bow and stern with the third gun positioned abaft the bridge on the forecastle deck. Their torpedo armament consisted of three twin rotating mounts for 533-millimetre (21.0 in) torpedoes; two mounts were located between the stern gun and the funnels while the third mount was placed between the forward funnel and the forecastle. The ships were later rearmed with two triple-tube mounts in lieu of their twin mounts.

== Construction and career ==
Kawakaze was launched on 10 October 1917 at the Yokosuka Naval Arsenal and completed on 11 November 1918. She was decommissioned on 1 April 1934 and subsequently broken up.

== Bibliography ==
- Friedman, Norman (1985). "Japan". In Gardiner, Robert & Gray, Randal (eds.). Conway's All the World's Fighting Ships 1906–1921. Annapolis: Naval Institute Press. ISBN 0-87021-907-3.
- Jentschura, Hansgeorg; Jung, Dieter & Mickel, Peter (1977). Warships of the Imperial Japanese Navy, 1869–1945. Annapolis, Maryland: United States Naval Institute. ISBN 0-87021-893-X.
- Todaka, Kazushige; Fukui, Shizuo; Eldridge, Robert D. & Leonard, Graham B. (2020). Destroyers: Selected Photos from the Archives of the Kure Maritime Museum; the Best from the Collection of Shizuo Fukui's Photos of Japanese Warships. Japanese Naval Warship Photo Album. Annapolis, Maryland: Naval Institute Press. ISBN 978-1-59114-630-8.
- Watts, Anthony J. & Gordon, Brian G. (1971). The Imperial Japanese Navy. London: Macdonald. ISBN 0-35603-045-8.
