= Urakaze-class destroyer =

Class of Japanese Navy Destroyers

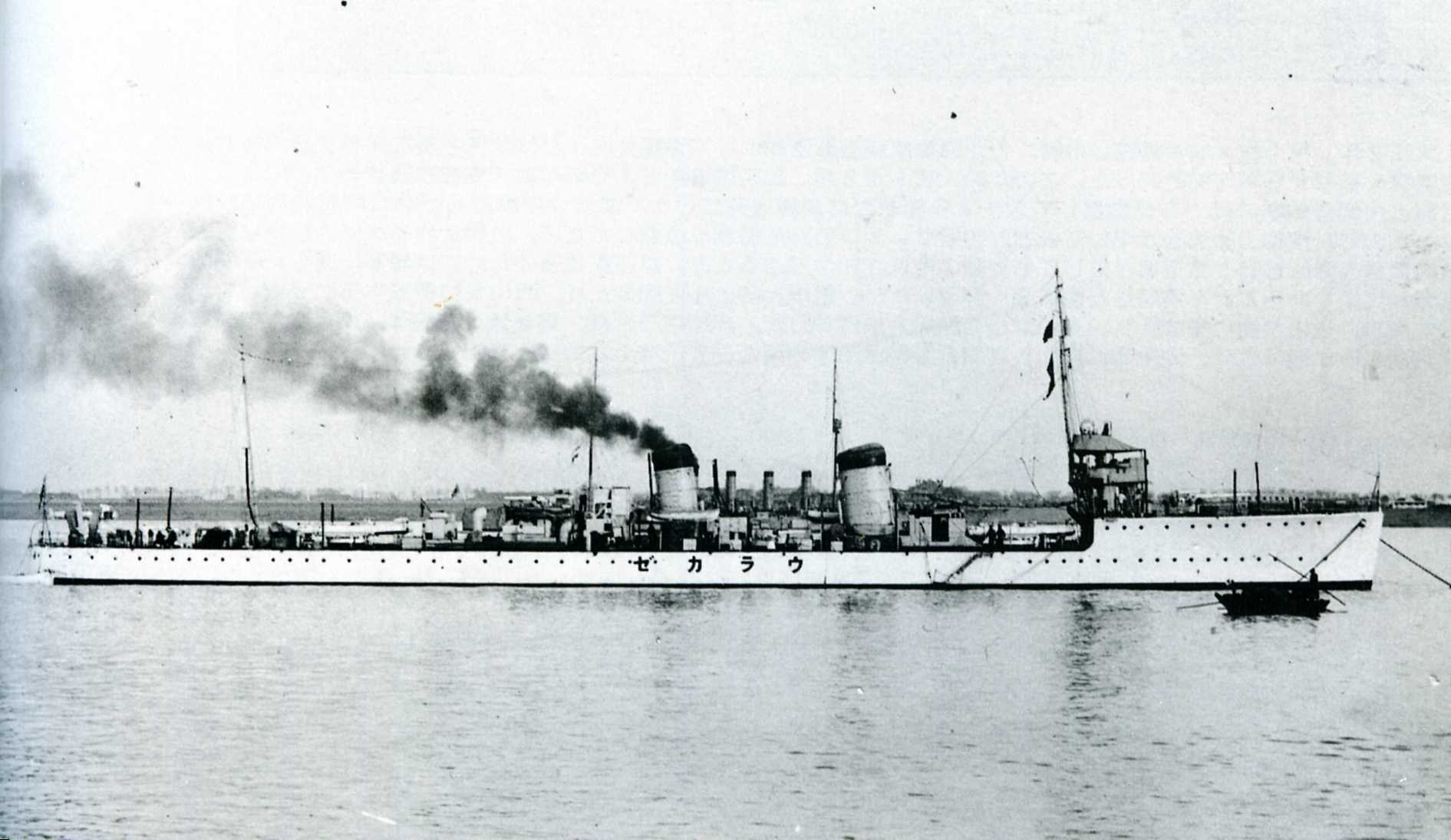
- Urakaze at Wuhan, China, sometime between 1930 and 1933.

Class overview
- Name: Urakaze class
- Builders: Yarrow Shipbuilders, Scotstoun, Scotland
- Operators: Imperial Japanese Navy; Regia Marina; Kriegsmarine
- Preceded by: Sakura class
- Succeeded by: Kaba class
- Built: 1913–17
- In commission: 1917–45
- Completed: 2
- Lost: 2

General characteristics
- Type: Destroyer
- Displacement: 907 long tons (922 t) normal, 1,085 long tons (1,102 t) full load
- Length: 83.9 m (275 ft) pp, 87.2 m (286 ft) overall
- Beam: 8.4 m (28 ft)
- Draught: 2.4 m (7.9 ft)
- Installed power: 22,000 shp (16,000 kW); 3 Yarrow boilers
- Propulsion: 2 shafts; 2 steam turbines
- Speed: 30 knots (56 km/h; 35 mph)
- Range: 1,800 nmi (3,300 km; 2,100 mi) at 15 knots (28 km/h; 17 mph)
- Complement: 120
- Armament: (Urakaze); 1 single QF 4.7 inch Gun Mk I – IV; 4 single 3-inch 12-pounder guns; 2 twin 533 mm (21.0 in) torpedo tubes

The Urakaze-class destroyers (浦風型駆逐艦, Urakazegata kuchikukan) were a class of two destroyers built for the Imperial Japanese Navy by Yarrow Shipbuilders of Scotland. These were the last Japanese destroyers ordered from overseas shipyards. While still under construction, one ship was transferred to Italy in 1916.

== Background ==
The failure of Japanese shipbuilders with the Umikaze-class destroyers left the Japanese navy without a large destroyer capable of extended blue ocean operations. The Parsons steam turbines of the Umikaze class were plagued with maintenance issues, as well as tremendous fuel consumption. The navy then returned to its previous mainstay for new technology and equipment, Yarrow shipyards in the United Kingdom, ordering two vessels to a new design in the 1911 fiscal budget.

However, Yarrow, along with other British shipyards, had a large backlog of orders, and it was not until 1915 that the new vessels could be completed, and due to the outbreak of World War I, not until 1919 before Urakaze was turned over to Japan.

== Design ==
The Urakaze-class vessels made use of oil-fired Brown-Curtiss turbine engines, and had the distinction of being the first vessels built for Japan to be designed for use without coal. The initial design called for diesel engines, however, due to the outbreak of World War I, Yarrow could not obtain necessary gear components from Germany.

Armament was slightly less than that of the Umikaze class, with a single QF 4.7 inch Gun Mk I – IV mounted on the small forecastle forward of the bridge and four QF 3 inch 12 pounder guns, two amidships, one of the stern, and one mounted on a tall pedestal just aft of the smokestacks. The Urakaze class was also the first Japanese class of destroyers to use the 533-mm diameter torpedoes.

== Operational history ==
Urakaze was turned over to the Imperial Japanese Navy too late to see combat service in World War I. It was used for many years in patrols on the Yangzi River. It was retired in 1936, and used as a training vessel for the Yokosuka Special Naval Landing Forces. It was sunk in an air attack by United States Navy aircraft on 18 July 1945.

Due to a strong request from the British government, Kawakaze was sold by Japan prior to completion to the Regia Marina of Italy. Italy was one of the Allies of World War I, and faced a severe shortage of modern warships. Kawakaze was completed as Audace, and later modified into the controller of the radio-controlled target ship Italian cruiser San Marco, and saw considerable combat service in the Mediterranean. During World War II, the ship was captured by the German Kriegsmarine, and renamed TA20. The vessel was sunk during the action of 1 November 1944 near Pag Island in the Adriatic Sea.

== Ships ==
Construction data
Kanji	Name	Builder	Laid down	Launched	Completed	Fate
浦風	Urakaze "Bay Wind"	Yarrow Shipbuilders, Scotland	1 October 1913	16 February 1915	14 October 1915	Retired, 1 April 1936; re-designated "Escort vessel No.18", sunk, 18 July 1945
江風	Kawakaze "Inlet Wind"	Yarrow Shipbuilders, Scotland	1 October 1913	27 September 1915	23 December 1916	Sold to Italy, 7 October 1915, renamed Audace; captured by Germany, 20 September 1943, renamed TA20; sunk, 1 November 1944
