= Japanese cruiser Myōkō =

Myōkō class heavy cruiser

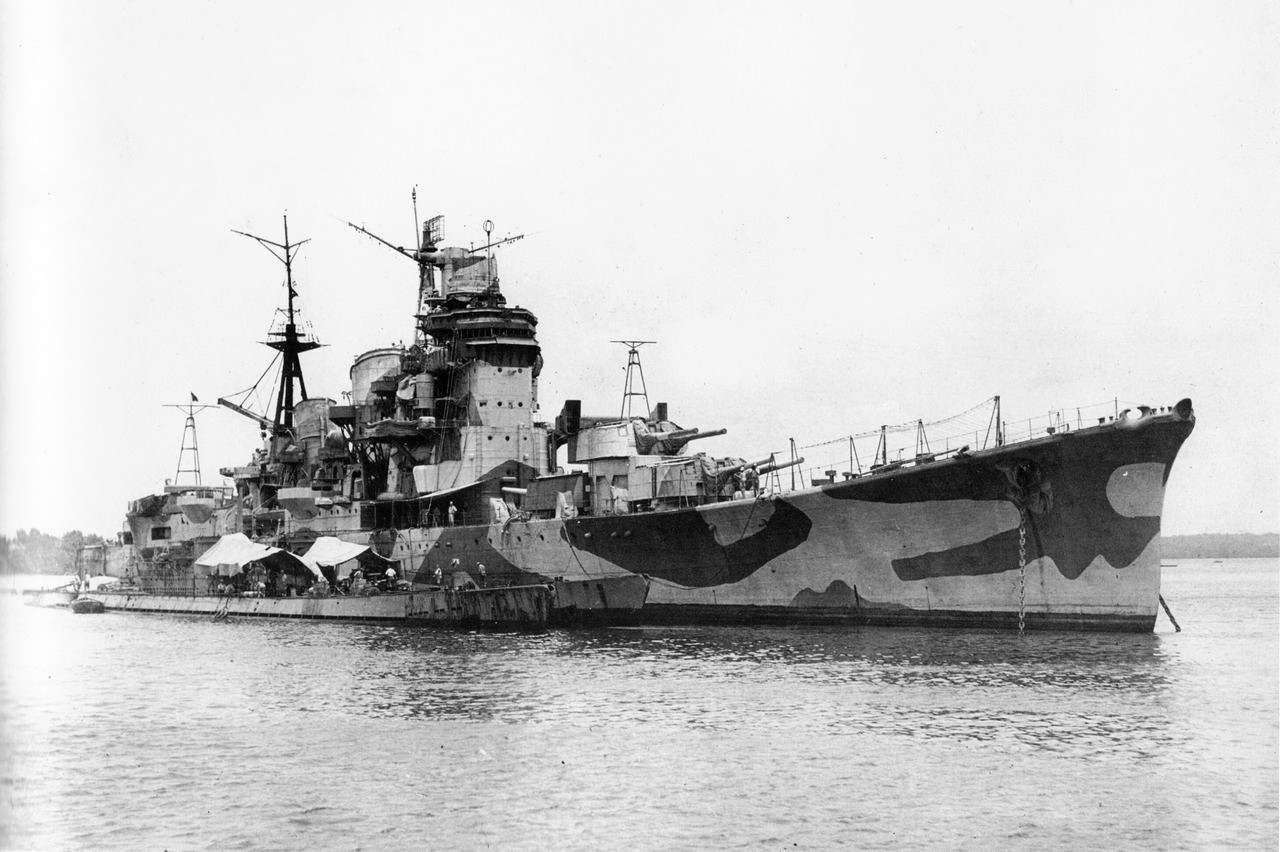
- Myōkō in Singapore at the end of World War II:: Submarines I-501 and I-502 are tied up alongside.

History

Empire of Japan
- Name: Myōkō
- Namesake: Mount Myōkō
- Ordered: 1924
- Builder: Yokosuka Naval Arsenal
- Laid down: 25 October 1924
- Launched: 16 April 1927
- Commissioned: 31 July 1929
- Stricken: 10 August 1946
- Fate: Scuttled in the Strait of Malacca, 8 July 1946; 3°5′N 100°40′E

General characteristics
- Class & type: Myōkō-class cruiser
- Displacement: 13,500 t (13,300 long tons)
- Length: 201.7 m (661 ft 9 in)
- Beam: 20.73 m (68 ft 0 in)
- Draft: 6.32 m (20 ft 9 in)
- Propulsion: 4-shaft geared turbines; 12 Kampon boilers; 130,000 shp
- Speed: 36 knots (41 mph; 67 km/h)
- Range: 8,000 nmi (15,000 km) at 14 kn (16 mph; 26 km/h)
- Complement: 773
- Armament: 10 × 203 mm (8.0 in) guns (5×2); 6 × 12 cm/45 10th Year Type naval gun guns (to 1934) or 8 × 12.7 cm/40 Type 89 naval guns (from 1935); 2 × 13.2 mm (0.52 in) machine guns; 12 × 610 mm (24 in) torpedo tubes
- Armor: Main belt: 100 mm (3.9 in); Main deck: 37 mm (1.5 in); Turrets: 25 mm (0.98 in); Barbettes: 75 mm (3.0 in)
- Aircraft carried: 3
- Aviation facilities: 2 aircraft catapults

Service record
- Part of: (Empire of Japan) Imperial Japanese Navy
- Operations: First Shanghai Incident; Second Sino-Japanese War; Pacific War; Battle of the Philippines (1941–42); Battle of the Java Sea (1942); Battle of the Coral Sea (1942); Battle of Midway (1942); Operation Ke (1942); Battle of Empress Augusta Bay (1943); Battle of the Philippine Sea (1944); Battle of Leyte Gulf (1944)

Myōkō (妙高) was the lead ship of the four-member Myōkō class of heavy cruisers of the Imperial Japanese Navy (IJN), which were active in World War II. She was named after Mount Myōkō in Niigata Prefecture. The other ships of the class were Nachi, Ashigara, and Haguro.

== Background ==
Myōkō was approved under the 1922–1929 Fleet Modernization Program, as the first heavy cruiser to be built by Japan within the design constraints imposed by the Washington Naval Treaty, and was the first of the "10,000 ton" cruisers built by any nation. Naval architect Vice Admiral Yuzuru Hiraga was able to keep the design from becoming dangerously top-heavy in its early years by continually rejecting demands from the Imperial Japanese Navy General Staff for additional equipment to the upper decks. During modifications and rebuildings in the 1930s, though, the final displacement rose to 15,933 tons, well over the treaty limits.

== Design ==
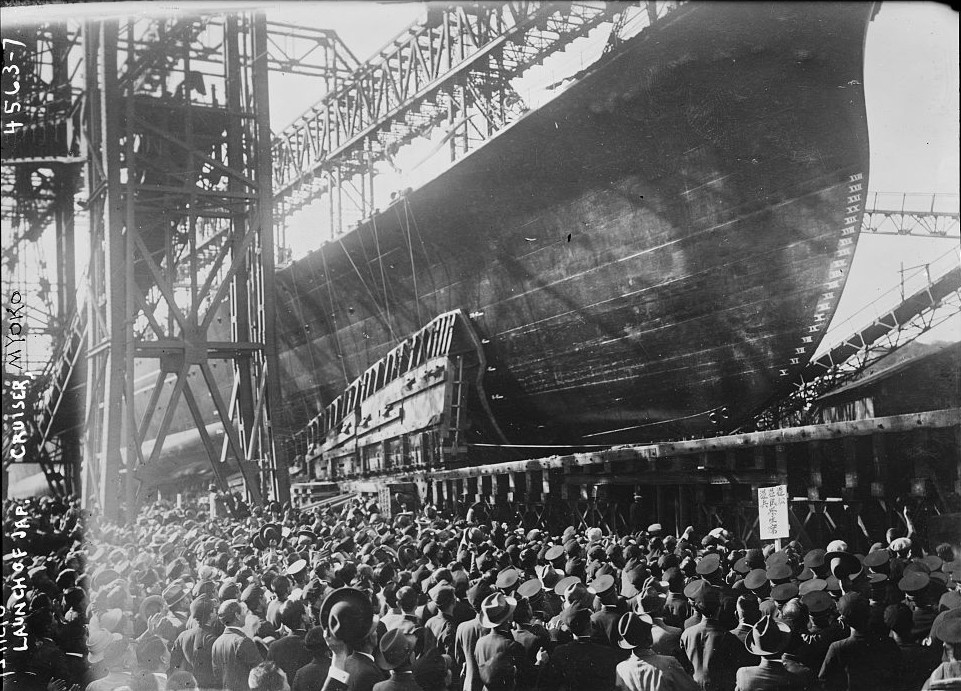
Launch of Myōkō, April 16 1927

The Myōkō class displaced 13,500 t (13,300 long tons), with a hull design based on an enlarged version of the Aoba-class cruiser. Myōkō was 203.8 metres (669 ft) long, with a beam of 19.5 metres (64 ft) and draft of 6.36 metres (20.9 ft), and was capable of 35.5 knots (65.7 km/h; 40.9 mph).

Propulsion was by 12 Kampon boilers driving four sets of single-impulse, geared-turbine engines, with four shafts turning three-bladed propellers. The ship was armored with a 102 mm (4 in) side belt, and 35 mm (1 in) armored deck, but the bridge was not armored.

Myōkō’s main battery was ten 20 cm/50 3rd Year Type naval guns, the heaviest armament of any heavy cruiser in the world at the time, mounted in five twin turrets. Her secondary armament included eight 12.7 cm/40 Type 89 naval guns in four twin mounts on each side, and 12 Type 93 Long Lance torpedoes in four triple launchers positioned below the aircraft deck. Myōkō was also equipped with an aircraft catapult and carried up to three floatplanes for scouting purposes.

Myōkō was laid down at the Yokosuka Naval Arsenal on 25 October 1924 and launched and named on 16 April 1927 in a ceremony attended by Emperor Hirohito, and was commissioned into the Imperial Japanese Navy on 31 July 1929. Although the first ship in her class to be laid down, she was the third to be completed.

Myōkō was repeatedly modernized and upgraded throughout her career to counter the growing threat of air strikes. She eventually mounted 52 Type 96 25 mm AT/AA Gun guns and two 13.2 mm (0.52 in) antiaircraft guns after her final upgrade.

== Operational history ==
=== Early service ===
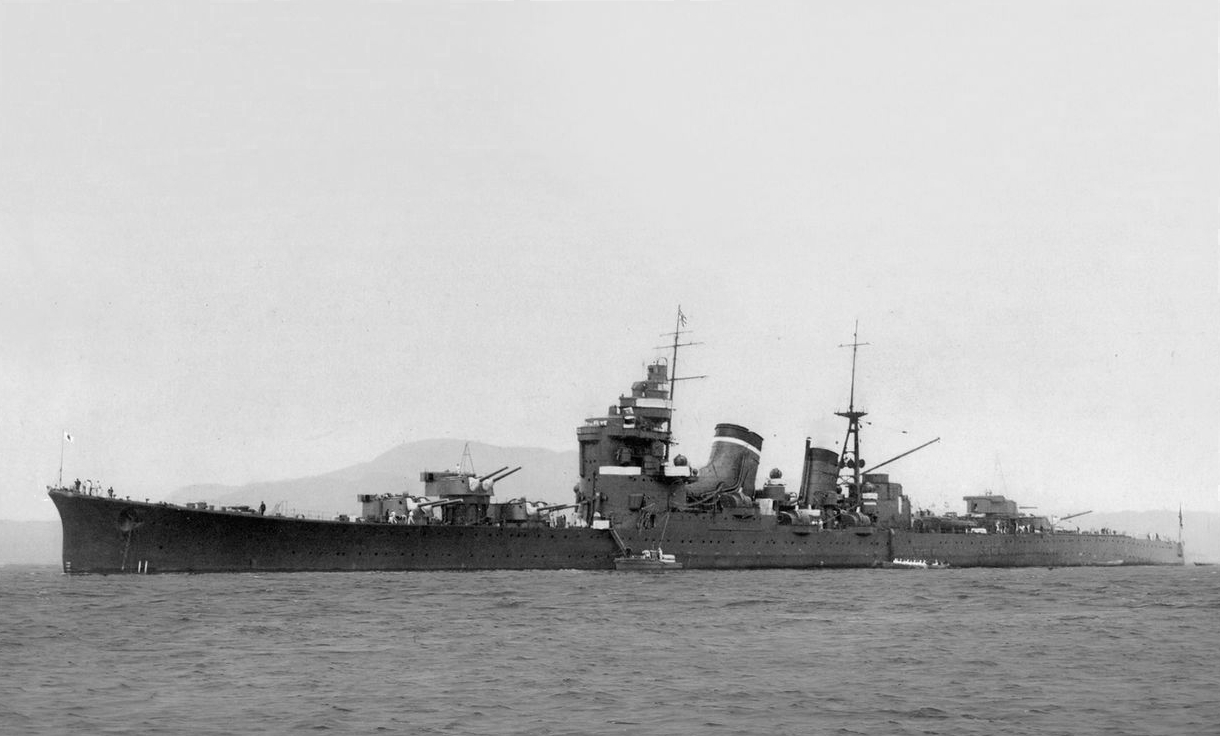
Myōkō at the Kure naval port, 1931

All of the Myōkō-class cruisers were assigned to the Sasebo Naval District, forming Sentai-4 of the IJN 3rd Fleet, and trained as a unit during the 1930s. During a naval review off Kobe on 26 October 1930, stack gases caused problems on the bridge, resulting in a lengthening of the forward smokestack by 2.0 m.

During the First Shanghai Incident of February 1932, the cruisers escorted the transports conveying elements of the Imperial Japanese Army (IJA) to the continent. In December 1932, the Myōkō-class ships were placed in reserve as the new Takao-class cruisers were commissioned, becoming the new Sentai-4, whereas the Myōkō-class ships were shifted to Sentai-5. Between 1933 and 1935, all Myōkō-class cruisers were retrofitted with their fixed triple torpedo launchers replaced by two quadruple rotatable launchers, and their secondary guns upgraded from 12 cm/45 10th Year Type naval guns to 12.7 cm/40 Type 89 naval guns. In 1935, Myōkō was damaged in a typhoon as part of the Fourth Fleet incident.

During the Second Sino-Japanese War, Myōkō participated in the Amoy Operation from 10–12 May 1938 as flagship of Sentai-9 of the IJN 5th Fleet along with the Hainan Island Operation in February 1939.

A second reconstruction and retrofit was completed in April 1941, doubling the number of torpedoes to 16, adding another eight Type 96 25 mm AT/AA guns, and bulges to the hull to improve stability.

=== Pacific War ===
==== Invasion of the Philippines ====
At the time of the attack on Pearl Harbor, Myōkō and Nachi formed Sentai-5 of the IJN 3rd Fleet. Sentai-5 was commanded by Rear Admiral Takeo Takagi and deployed from Palau cover for the landings of Japanese forces under "Operation M" — the invasion of the southern Philippine Islands. After covering the landings of Japanese forces at Legaspi on 11 December 1941, Myōkō and Nachi returned to Palau and were then reassigned to the Rear Admiral Raizō Tanaka, whose attack force covered landings at Davao on 19 December and Jolo on 24 December.

On 4 January 1942, Myōkō and the other vessels of Admiral Tanaka’s invasion force were attacked by United States Army Air Forces (USAAF) B-17 Flying Fortress bombers while at anchor at Davao. Myōkō was hit by one 500-pound (227 kg) bomb, causing only superficial damage, but she was drydocked at Sasebo Naval Arsenal for repairs.

==== Battle of the Java Sea ====
In the Battle of the Java Sea on 1 March 1942 Myōkō, Nachi, and Haguro participated in the destruction of the last remaining Allied fleet units in the Netherlands East Indies. At 11:50, Myōkō, Ashigara and destroyers Akebono and Inazuma opened fire on the damaged British heavy cruiser Exeter and her escort of two destroyers. During the engagement, the 8-inch guns of Myōkō combined fire with Ashigara to sink the destroyer HMS Encounter, while Nachi and Haguro combined fire to finish off Exeter.

Later in March, Myōkō received a refit at Sasebo Naval Arsenal. In April, she participated in the unsuccessful pursuit of the Doolittle Raid task force.

==== Battle of the Coral Sea ====
In May, Myōkō was part of the carrier strike force during the Operation Mo that resulted in the Tulagi invasion force and subsequently the Battle of the Coral Sea. She served as a flagship of Vice Admiral Takagi, who was in the overall command of the carrier strike force, which consisted of the aircraft carriers Shōkaku and Zuikaku, which were under a tactical command of Rear Admiral Chūichi Hara, the heavy cruisers Myōkō and Haguro, and five destroyers. Shōkaku was damaged by American aircraft and Zuikaku lost most of her aircraft in the Battle of the Coral Sea, forcing the flotilla to withdraw without invading Port Moresby.

==== Battle of Midway ====
In June, Myōkō was part of Vice Admiral Nobutake Kondō's support force in the Battle of Midway, which included the battleships Kongō and Hiei, the heavy cruisers Haguro, Atago and Chōkai, the light cruiser Yura, the light aircraft carrier Zuihō, and seven destroyers. The support force returned to Sendai in northern Japan on 23 June without engaging the enemy in this battle, and Myōkō was sent out on 28 June as escort for the reinforcement convoy in the Aleutian Islands Campaign. This force included the aircraft carrier Zuikaku, the light aircraft carriers Zuihō, Jun'yō, and Ryūjō, the heavy cruisers Maya, Takao, Myōkō, Haguro, and Nachi, and the light cruisers Abukuma, Kiso, and Tama. Myōkō returned to Hashirajima on 12 July 1942.

==== The Solomon Islands campaign ====
On 11 October 1942, Myōkō sailed from Truk as part of the IJN 2nd Fleet. This force also included the battleships Kongō and Haruna, the heavy cruisers Atago, Chōkai, and Nachi, the light cruiser Isuzu, and 12 destroyers. They were followed by Vice Admiral Chuichi Nagumo's carrier strike force. The mission was the reinforcement and resupply of Japanese troops on the island of Guadalcanal, which had been invaded by American troops in August. Myōkō was attacked on 14 September by a flight of 10 USAAF B-17 bombers, suffering light damage. On 15 October, she participated in a shore bombardment operation against the American-held Henderson Field together with Maya.

Between 31 January and 9 February 1943, Myōkō, after a refit at Sasebo, took part in the evacuation of Guadalcanal. The force consisted of the carriers Zuikaku, Zuihō, and Jun'yō, the battleships Kongō and Haruna, heavy cruisers Atago, Takao, Myōkō, and Haguro, the light cruisers Nagara and Agano, and 11 destroyers. The Japanese transports were successful in evacuating 11,700 troops from the island.

==== Later campaigns ====
In May 1943, Myōkō and Haguro sailed north to assist in the evacuation of Kiska. In June, they returned to Sasebo for another refit. Myōkō was equipped with four twin Type 96 25 mm AT/AA gun mounts, and a Type 21 air search radar set was also installed.

In response to American carrier aircraft raiding in the Gilbert Islands, Myōkō sortied with Vice Admiral Jisaburō Ozawa's fleet to engage the American carriers. The fleet consisted of the aircraft carriers Shōkaku, Zuikaku, and Zuihō, the battleships Yamato and Nagato, heavy cruisers Myōkō, Haguro, Tone, Chikuma, Mogami, Atago, Takao, Chōkai, and Maya, the light cruiser Agano, and 15 destroyers. Despite extensive searches, this force failed to make contact with the American strike force and returned to Truk.

On 1 November, Myōkō and Haguro sailed south from Truk with two destroyers, escorting a supply convoy to Rabaul. From Rabaul, Myōkō sailed with the light cruisers Agano and Sendai and six destroyers to escort reinforcements to the island of Bougainville. About 1,000 Japanese Army troops were carried by four fast destroyer transports. The warships sailed ahead of the transports and engaged an American force in the Battle of Empress Augusta Bay at 12:50 on 3 November.

The American force of four light cruisers and eight destroyers sank the Sendai with 6-inch (152 mm) gunfire. While avoiding the American gunfire, Myōkō collided with the destroyer Hatsukaze. Hatsukaze fell behind the task force as it withdrew, and was finished off by American gunfire. Haguro had received minor damage in the action, and the American destroyer USS Foote was crippled by a Long Lance torpedo.

On 17 November, Myōkō arrived at Sasebo for another refit. Eight single-mount 25 mm AA guns were added, bringing the total to 24 guns. In January, Myōkō (with Tone and two destroyers) made an uneventful transport run from Truk to Kavieng and back. On 10 February, while sailing from Truk to Palau with Atago and Chōkai and eight destroyers, Myōkō was attacked by the submarine USS Permit. The submarine fired four torpedoes, but all missed.

In March, Myōkō and the destroyer Shiratsuyu escorted an empty tanker convoy from Palau to Borneo. On 6 April, Myōkō was attacked by the submarine USS Dace. She fired all six bow torpedo tubes, but missed. The submarine USS Darter also spotted Myōkō, but was unable to maneuver into position for an attack.

==== Battle of the Philippine Sea ====
In June 1944, Myōkō participated in the Battle of the Philippine Sea. The Japanese fleet sailed from its anchorage at Tawi Tawi in response to the American invasion of the Marianas Islands. The Japanese high command was aware that American heavy bombers, based in the Marianas, could reach factories and shipyards in the Japanese home islands. This battle was later called the "Great Marianas Turkey Shoot" by American sailors, because over 300 Japanese carrier aircraft were shot down in a single day on 19 June.

==== Battle of Leyte Gulf ====
Myōkō participated in the Battle of Leyte Gulf as part of Vice Admiral Takeo Kurita's First Mobile Striking Force (Center Force) consisting of four battleships and 10 cruisers. As the Center Force tried to force a passage through the Sibuyan Sea, it was spotted and attacked by US Task Force 38. Although most airstrikes concentrated on the battleship Musashi, Myōkō was hit by a torpedo aft on the starboard side, which damaged her starboard screws. She broke off and headed for Singapore at a reduced speed of 15 knots (28 km/h; 17 mph), arriving on 2 November 1944. After temporary repairs, she departed for Japan with a stop at Cam Ranh Bay.

==== Fate ====
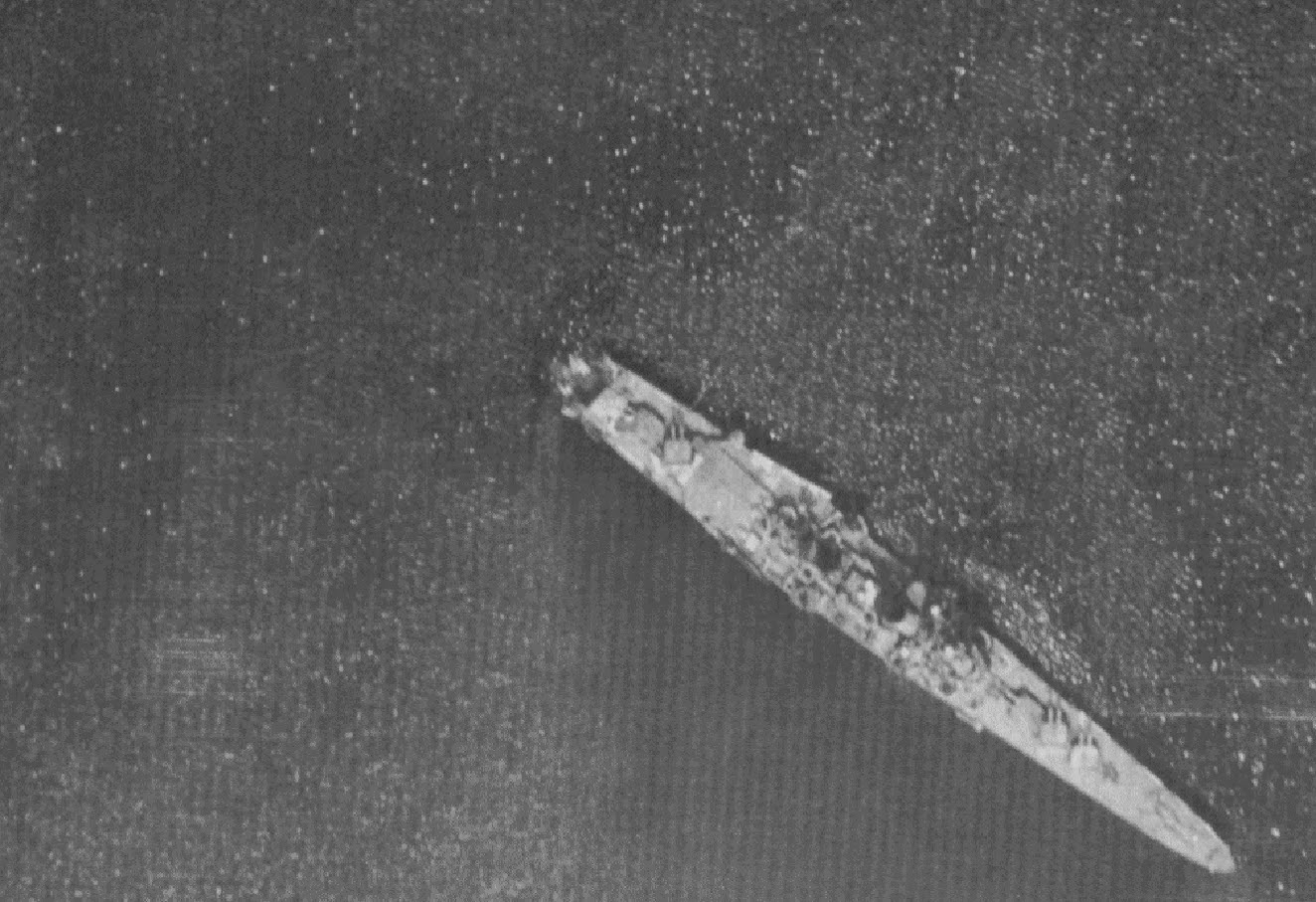
Aerial view of Myōkō in Singapore, February 1, 1945: Note the ship's missing stern.

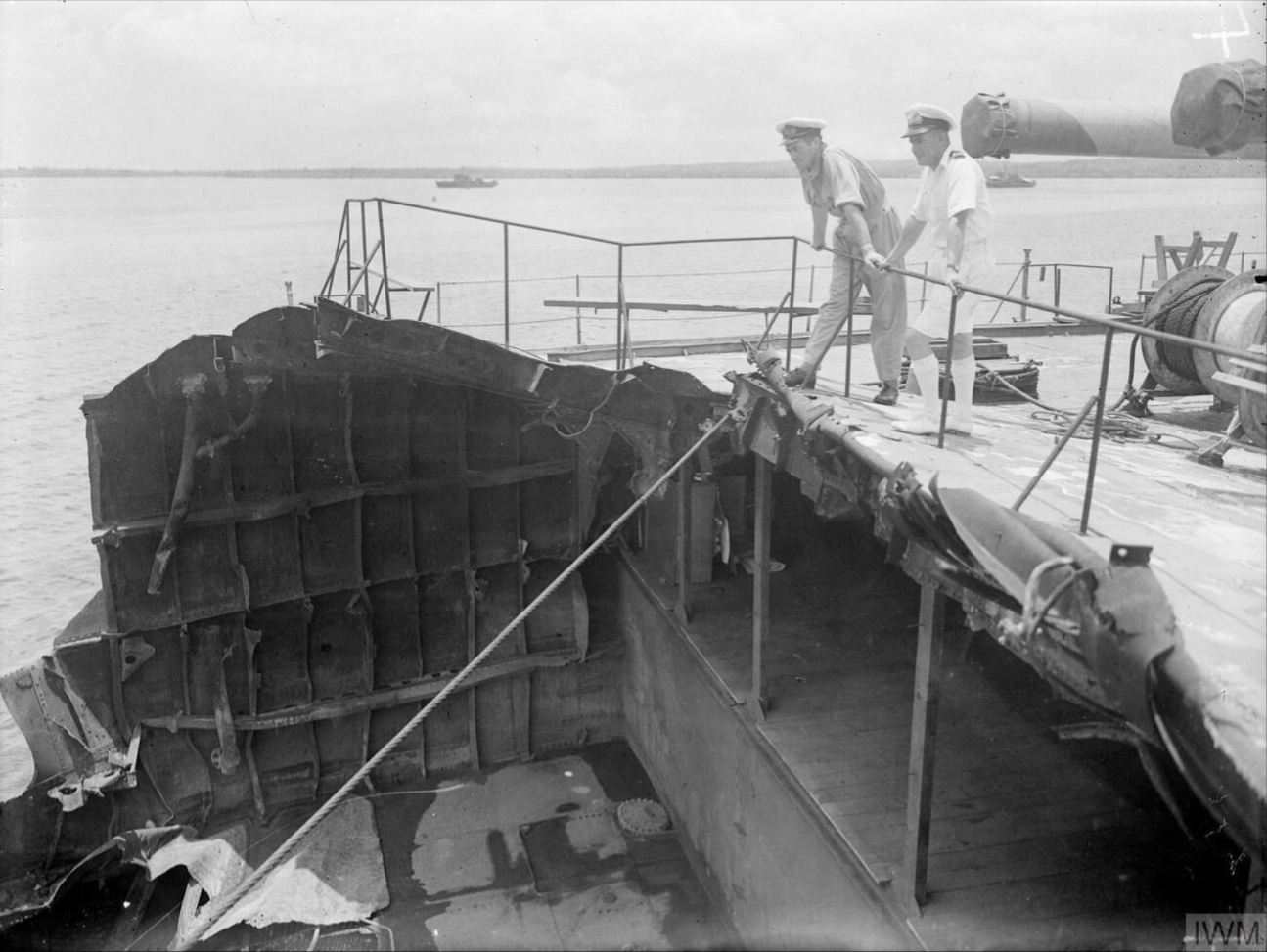
Two British naval officers examine what is left of Myōkō's stern.

En route to Cam Ranh Bay, Myōkō was hit by one torpedo from a spread of six, fired by the submarine USS Bergall at 17:35 on 13 December 1944 on her aft port side, blowing away her stern, and leaving her unable to steer. She went dead in the water. Despite the extensive damage to the aft, one port screw remained operable and she could make 6 knots (11 km/h; 6.9 mph). Unable to steer, she was towed by destroyer Ushio (which assisted in damaging Bergall, which survived and returned to Fremantle) and several other ships to Singapore harbor for repairs, but materials in Singapore were insufficient to complete the repairs for both Myōkō and Takao, the latter which had been severely damaged by two submarine-launched torpedoes prior to the Sibuyan Sea battle.

In February 1945, the harbor commander reported that Myōkō was irreparable at Singapore without more materials, and impossible to tow to Japan. He recommended that Myōkō be kept in Singapore as a floating antiaircraft battery, and this suggestion was approved. Both Myōkō and Takao were targeted by British midget submarine attacks on 26 July, but survived the war.

Myōkō formally surrendered to Royal Navy units on 21 September 1945, and was subsequently towed to the Strait of Malacca and scuttled off Port Swettenham, Malaya (near present-day Port Klang, Malaysia) at 3°5′N 100°40′E on 8 July 1946, near submarines I-501 and I-502.
