= Japanese occupation of Kiska =

Japanese military occupation during WWII (1942–1943)

- Part of the American Theater and the Pacific Theater of World War II
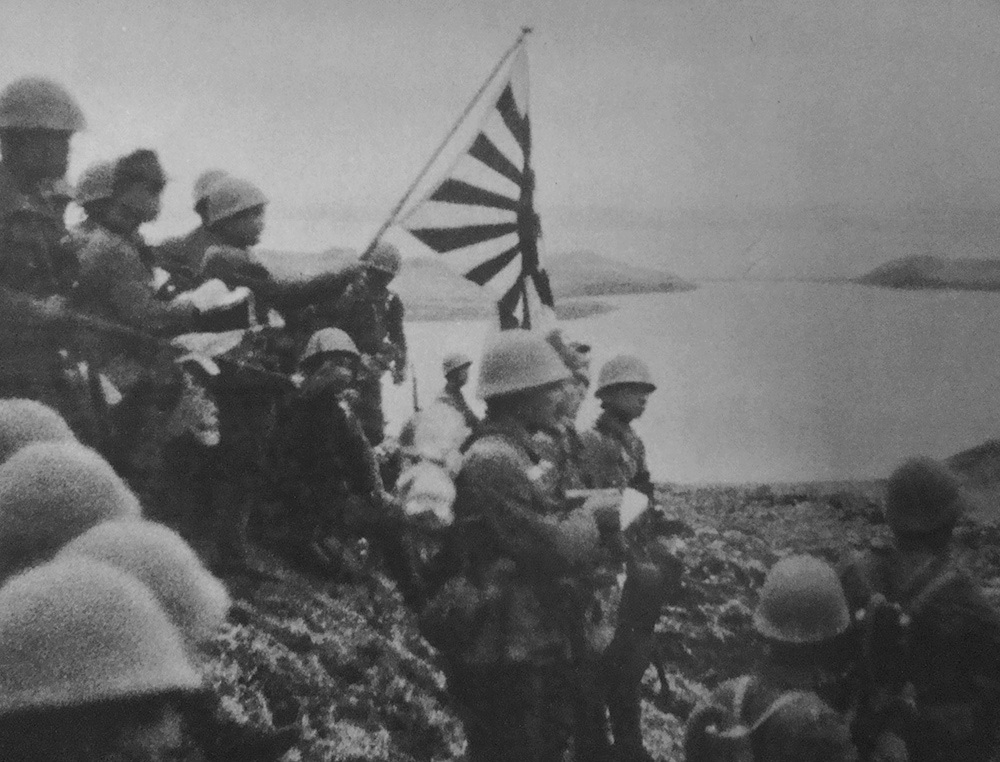
- Japanese troops raise the Imperial battle flag on Kiska after landing on 6 June 1942.
Date	6 June 1942 – 28 July 1943
Location	Kiska, Aleutian Islands, Territory of Alaska, United States 51.973°N 177.495°E
Result	Japanese victory
Territorial changes	Japanese occupation commences

Belligerents
United States: United States Navy	Japan: Imperial Japanese Navy; Special Naval Landing Forces

Commanders and leaders
Lt. Mulls (Not present during initial landing)	(Empire of Japan) Kiichiro Higuchi (Empire of Japan) Takeji Ono (Empire of Japan) Boshiro Hosogaya (Empire of Japan) Monzo Akiyama

Strength
10-man weather station 1–6 dogs 3 aircraft	500+ Special Naval Landing Forces (initial force); 5,183–5,400 civilians and soldiers (occupation)

Casualties and losses
2 killed 7 captured 1 escaped (later surrendered)	No casualties during initial capture

The Japanese occupation of Kiska took place between 6 June 1942 and 28 July 1943 during the Aleutian Islands campaign of the American Theater and the Pacific Theater of World War II. The Japanese occupied Kiska and nearby Attu Island in order to protect the northern flank of the Japanese Empire.

== Background ==
For the Imperial Japanese Navy, the North Pacific had a vast frontage from the Kuril Islands to Minami-Tori-shima, and patrols in this vast sea area with few islands had not been easy. The Fifth Fleet, which conducted patrols of the ocean off east of Japan, had begun to advocate since the end of January 1942 that the Imperial Navy occupy the western Aleutian Islands and advance the patrol line. In addition, the air raid on Minami-Tori-shima by the United States in March 1942 raised concerns about the North Pacific Ocean throughout the Japanese military.

=== Operation AL ===
Although it is not clear how the Navy General Staff requested the Combined Fleet Command to plan the Aleutian Operation (Operation AL) to occupy Attu and Kiska Islands, the Navy General Staff seemed to have acknowledged the necessity of Operation AL in response to the proposition of the Fifth Fleet when considering the attempt to overtake Midway (Operation MI).

The plan of Operation AL was consulted with the Imperial General Headquarters army section on 15 April. In early June, the navy would attack Dutch Harbor and Adak Island, and occupy Kiska Island and Attu Island. The Imperial Japanese Army was reluctant to occupy the Aleutian Islands and responded to the navy on 16 April that they would not dispatch troops to the operation. However, the Doolittle Raid on Japan from the North Pacific on 18 April had a great influence on Operation AL. After the air raids on Japan by the Doolittle bombers, the army acknowledged the need to set up patrol bases on the western Aleutian Islands and agreed on 21 April to dispatch troops.

The Navy General Staff promoted Operation MI and Operation AL with the primary purpose of advancing the bases for patrol line, and the Combined Fleet Command also followed it. In other words, the purpose of Operation AL was to build a patrol network in the North Pacific by establishing bases on Midway, Attu, and Kiska to monitor attacks on Japan mainland by US task forces. At the same time, it was intended to prevent advances of US air bases.

Eventually, it was determined that the Imperial Army would invade Attu Island and the Imperial Navy (Navy Maizuru Third Special Naval Landing Force) would invade Kiska Island. The army established the North Sea Detachment (Hokkai-shitai) on 5 May, headed by Major Matsutoshi Hozumi and consisting of approximately 1,000 men.

The order of operation was announced on 5 May. Hozumi was tasked to secure or destroy key points in the western part of the Aleutian Islands, and to make enemy mobility and air power advance in this area difficult. The finalized plan was to destroy Adak's military facilities and then withdraw. Next, the army troops were to invade Attu while the navy invaded Kiska.
Prior to the landings, air raids from carriers were to destroy the air force at Dutch Harbor.

== Occupation ==
Initially, the only American military presence on Kiska was a 12-man United States Navy weather station—two of whom were not present during the invasion—and a dog named Explosion. The Japanese stormed the station, killing two Americans and capturing seven. After realizing that Chief Petty Officer William C. House had escaped, a search was launched by the occupying forces. The search ended in vain, with House surrendering some 50 days after the initial seizure of the weather station, having been unable to cope with the freezing conditions and starvation. After 50 days of eating only plants and worms, he weighed just 80 pounds. Beforehand, the prisoners of war had been sent to Japan.

The attack on Pearl Harbor and beginning of the Pacific Theater in World War II, coupled with Japanese threats to mainland Alaska along with the rest of the United States West Coast, had already made the construction of a defense access highway to Alaska a priority. On 6 February 1942, the construction of the Alaska Highway was approved by the US Army and the project received the authorization from Congress and President Franklin D. Roosevelt to proceed five days later.

Reacting to the Japanese occupation, American and Allied forces waged a continuous air bombardment campaign against the Japanese forces on Kiska. Also, US Navy warships blockaded and periodically bombarded the island. Several Japanese warships, transport ships, and submarines attempting to travel to Kiska or Attu were sunk or damaged by the blockading forces.

== Evacuation ==
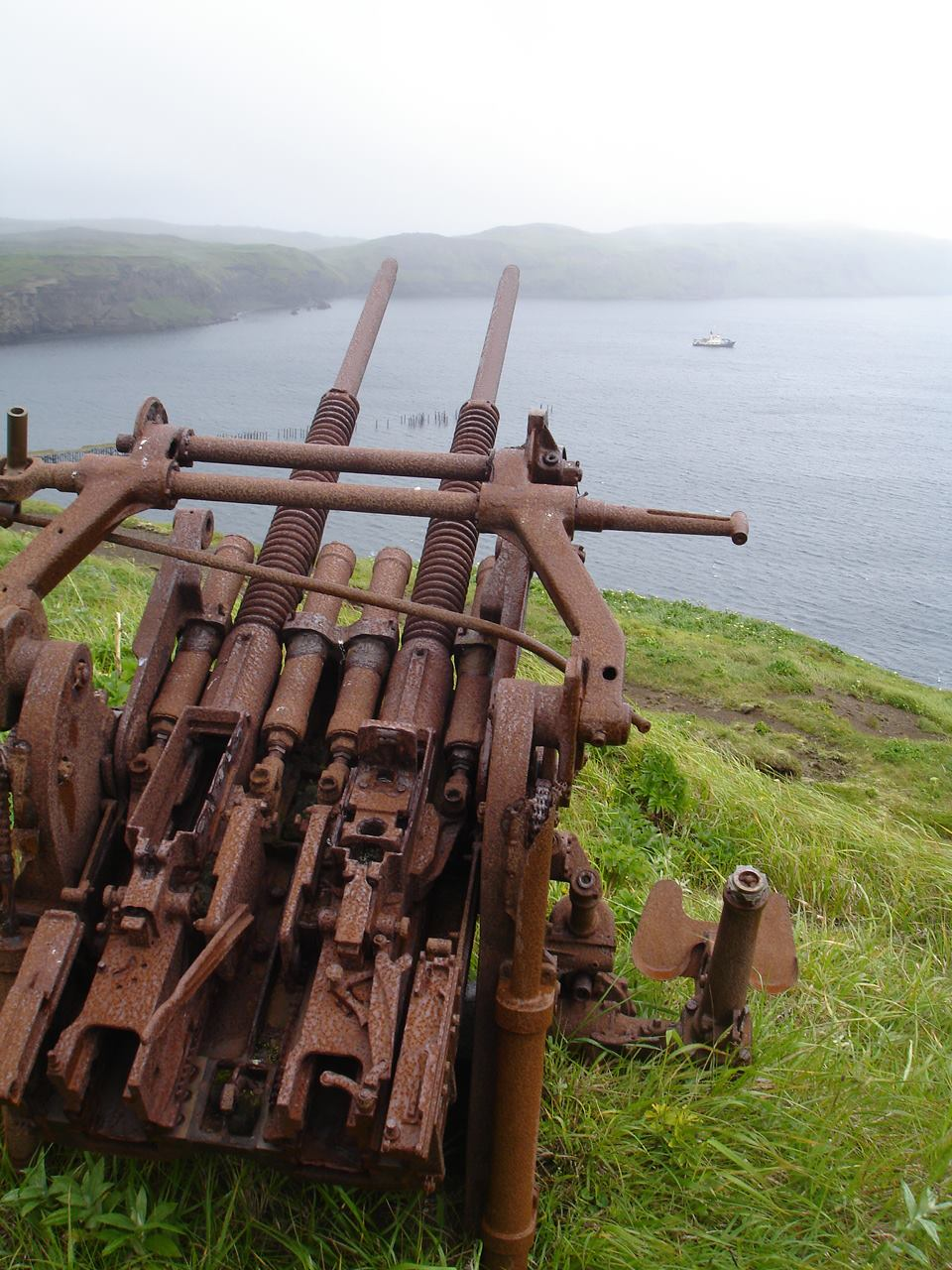
Japanese Type 96 anti-aircraft gun abandoned on Kiska, seen in 2016

In May 1943, US forces landed on Attu in Operation Landcrab and subsequently destroyed the Japanese garrison there. In response, the Imperial Japanese Navy successfully evacuated the island of Kiska, ending the Japanese presence in the Aleutian Islands.

On July 29, 1943, Rear Admiral Kimura Masatomi, commanding two light cruisers and ten destroyers, slipped through the American blockade under the cover of fog and rescued 5,193 men. The operation was run by light cruisers Abukuma (1,212 men) and Kiso (1,189 men), and destroyers Yūgumo (479 men), Kazagumo (478 men), Usugumo (478 men), Asagumo (476 men), Akigumo (463 men) and Hibiki (418 men). The destroyers Hatsushimo, Naganami, Shimakaze and Samidare gave cover to the operation.

The successful evacuation of the garrison was subject of 1965 Seiji Maruyama's movie "Taiheiyô kiseki no sakusen: Kisuka" (literally, "Miracle Operation in the Pacific: Kiska").

Not completely sure that the Japanese were gone, the Americans and Canadians executed an unopposed landing on Kiska on 15 August, securing the island and ending the Aleutian Islands campaign. After the landing, the soldiers were greeted by a group of dogs which had been left behind. Among them was Explosion, who had been cared for by the Japanese.

Even though the island was unoccupied, the Allied forces still suffered casualties. There was a thick fog which was in part responsible for friendly fire incidents, which killed 24 soldiers. Four more were killed by booby traps the Japanese had left behind. The destroyer USS Abner Read also struck a naval mine which killed 71.

== Naval operations ==
On 19 June 1942, American aircraft attacked and sank the Japanese oiler Nissan Maru in Kiska Harbor, and on 30 June American naval forces bombarded the island. The submarine USS Growler attacked and sank Japanese destroyer Arare 7 mi (6.1 nmi; 11 km) east of Kiska Harbor on 5 July; two other destroyers (Kasumi and Shiranui) were heavily damaged. Over 200 Japanese sailors were killed or wounded while the Americans sustained no losses. It became the single bloodiest engagement during the operations on and around Kiska. USS Grunion was attacked by three Japanese submarine chasers while patrolling Kiska Harbor on 15 July. In response, she fired on and sank two of the ships and damaged the third. Grunion was lost a few weeks later off Kiska on 30 July with all hands; she is suspected of being sunk after one of her own torpedoes circled back when she attacked the Kano Maru.

On 8 August, the Japanese cargo ship Kano Maru was sunk at Kiska Harbor by PBY Catalinas. Days before, the cargo ship was damaged by one of Grunion's torpedoes. Troopship Nozima Maru was also bombed and sunk in Kiska Harbor on 15 September. On 5 October, the Japanese steamer Borneo Maru was sunk at Gertrude Cove, and on 17 October the destroyer Oboro was sunk by American aircraft. Ro-65 sank off Kiska on 4 November, Montreal Maru on 6 January 1943, and Uragio Maru on 4 April. I-7 was grounded and abandoned by her crew on 23 June while assisting in removing Kiska's garrison. She was chased onto the rocks by USS Monaghan.

== See also ==
- Japanese Occupation Site, Kiska Island
- Aleutian Islands World War II National Monument
- Attacks on the United States
