= 5th Fleet (Imperial Japanese Navy) =

- Active: 1 February 1938—15 November 1939; 25 July 1941—5 February 1945
- Country: (Empire of Japan)
- Branch: Imperial Japanese Navy
- Engagements: Second Sino-Japanese War; Hainan Island Operation; World War II (Pacific War); Aleutian Islands campaign; Battle of the Komandorski Islands
- Battle honours: Pacific Theatre of World War II

Commanders
- Notable commanders: Nobutake Kondō

The 5th Fleet (第五艦隊, Dai-go Kantai) was a fleet of the Imperial Japanese Navy, active during the early portions of the Second Sino-Japanese War, and again in World War II, primarily in the Aleutian campaign, during which it was augmented and designated the Northern Area Force.

== History ==
=== Second Sino-Japanese War ===
The 5th Fleet was initially formed on 1 February 1938 as part of the Japanese military emergency expansion program in the aftermath of the North China Incident of 1937. The initial plan was to construct 3rd, 4th and 5th China Area Fleets to cover the invasions of Japanese troops into mainland China, and to interdict and control commerce on the coasts. The 4th and 5th Fleets came under the operational control of the 2nd China Expeditionary Fleet. It participated in the Hainan Island Operation and other maritime interdiction operations off the Chinese coast. The fleet was disbanded on 15 November 1939 when its operations were merged into the China Area Fleet.

=== World War II ===
The 5th Fleet was resurrected on 25 July 1941, and tasked with patrols of northern Japanese waters from the northern portion of Honshū, through Hokkaidō, the Chishima Islands, and as far as the Bonin Islands to the east. With the threat of maritime invasion by the Soviet Union considered extremely remote, and with Japanese forces focused on attacking south (Nanshin-ron), the IJN 5th Fleet was considered of secondary importance and was only assigned a couple of light cruisers and smaller vessels.

With the outbreak of World War II, and the Doolittle Raid on Tokyo, the 5th Fleet was reinforced by a large number of converted armed merchant vessels. The operational plan for the Battle of Midway called for a diversionary strike north towards the Aleutian Islands. The cruisers of the 5th Fleet – designated the "Northern Area Force" after its augmentation for the operation – covered the landings of Japanese troops on Attu and Kiska on 6–7 June 1942, and were in the Battle of the Komandorski Islands against the United States Navy on 27 March 1943.

However, the IJN 5th Fleet was unable to prevent the recapture of Attu by American forces in May 1943, and – after the abolition of the Northern Area Force on 4–5 August 1943 – from 5 August 1943 to 5 December 1944, the 5th Fleet was reorganized under the operational control of the Northeast Area Fleet, which oversaw the withdrawal of Japanese forces from Kiska and reinforcement of the northern approaches to Japan.

Following Japan's withdrawal from the Aleutians, the Northeast Area Fleet was reassigned directly to the Philippines in October 1944. It participated in the Battle of Leyte Gulf, and surviving vessels were joined to the Southwest Area Fleet on 15 December 1944. On 5 February 1945, the Southwest Area Fleet became the IJN 10th Area Fleet, at which time the remnants of the 5th Fleet's administrative structure were disbanded.

== Structure ==
=== In Second Sino-Japanese War ===
- Cruiser Division 9
  - Heavy cruiser Myōko (Flagship), Light cruiser Nagara
- Cruiser Division 10
  - Light cruiser Tenryū, Tatsuta
- Torpedo Squadron 5
  - Light cruiser Yūbari
  - Destroyer Division 3
    - Destroyer Shiokaze, Yūkaze, Tachikaze, Hokaze, Shimakaze, Yakaze, Nadakaze
  - Destroyer Division 16
    - Destroyer Asagao, Yūgao, Fuyō, Karukaya
  - Destroyer Division 23
    - Destroyer Kikuzuki, Mikazuki, Mochizuki, Yūzuki
- Carrier Division 3
  - Seaplane tender Kamoi, Auxiliary seaplane tender Kagu Maru, Kamikawa Maru
- Carrier Division 4
  - Seaplane tender Notoro, Auxiliary seaplane tender Kinugasa Maru

=== Order of Battle at time of Pearl Harbor ===
- Cruiser Division 21 (Based at Ōminato)
  - Light cruiser Tama (Flagship), Kiso, Auxiliary seaplane tender Kimikawa Maru (based at Horomushiro)
- Cruiser Division 22 (based at Kushiro)
  - Auxiliary cruiser Akagi Maru, Asaka Maru, Awata Maru
- Gunboat Division 10
  - Auxiliary gunboat Yoshida Maru, Magane Maru
- Subchaser Division 66
  - Auxiliary subchaser Fumi Maru, No.2 Seki Maru,
  - Auxiliary netlayer Kōgi Maru
- Minesweeper Division 17
  - Auxiliary minesweeper No.5 Toshi Maru, No.8 Toshi Maru, Keinan Maru, No.11 Misago Maru
- Patrol division 7
  - Support craft Hokuyō-Gō, Auxiliary support craft No.1 Sasayama Maru
  - 1st Platoon
    - Auxiliary patrol boat No.5 Fukuichi Maru, Chōkai Maru, No.5 Seiju Maru, Kairyū Maru
  - 2nd Platoon
    - Auxiliary patrol boat No.3 Yachiyo Maru, No.23 Toku Maru, No.1 Fuku Maru
  - 3rd Platoon
    - Auxiliary patrol boat Eikichi Maru, No.3 Shōsei Maru, Shōei Maru, No.2 Taihei Maru
  - 4th Platoon
    - Auxiliary patrol boat No.5 Ebisu Maru, No.2 Kaihō Maru, Kaijin Maru
  - 5th Platoon
    - Auxiliary patrol boat No.1 Nittō Maru, No.2 Nittō Maru, No.23 Nittō Maru
  - 6th Platoon
    - Auxiliary patrol boat No.25 Nittō Maru, Kōki Maru, Fuji Maru
- No.7 Base Force (based at Chichi-jima)
- Chichijima Naval Air Group
- Direct control from headquarter of the fleet
  - Torpedo boat Sagi, Hato
- Attached ships for the fleet
  - Oiler Shiriya
  - Auxiliary gunboat Kaihō Maru
  - Auxiliary transport ship Nissan Maru, Chōkō Maru, No.2 Tōkō Maru, Akashisan Maru

=== Order of Battle at time of Operation Cottage ===
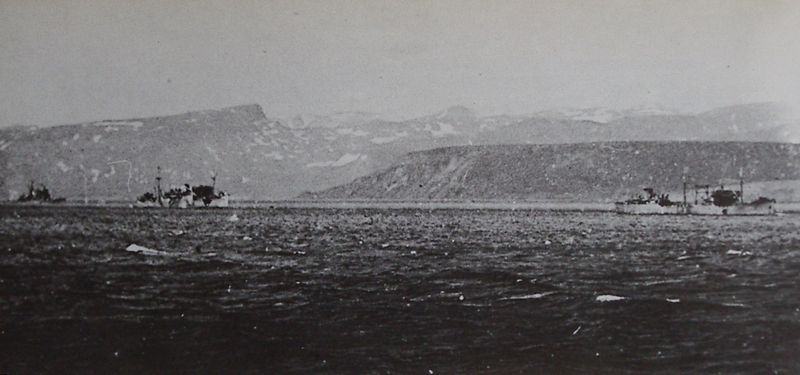
5th Fleet in May 1943

- Cruiser Division 21 (based at Horomushiro)
  - Heavy cruiser Nachi (Flagship), Maya, Light cruiser Tama, Kiso
- Cruiser Division 22
  - Auxiliary cruiser Akagi Maru, Asaka Maru, Awata Maru
- Cruiser Destroyer Squadron 1 (based at Horomushiro)
  - Light cruiser Abukuma
  - Destroyer Division 2 (This division was detached from CruDesron 4.)
    - Destroyer Samidare
  - Destroyer Division 6 (This division was detached from CruDesron 11.)
    - Destroyer Hibiki
  - Destroyer Division 9
    - Destroyer Asagumo, Usugumo
  - Destroyer Division 10 (This division was detached from CruDesron 10.)
    - Destroyer Yūgumo, Akigumo, Kazagumo
  - Destroyer Division 21 (Shimakaze was detached from CruDesron 2.)
    - Destroyer Shimakaze, Wakaba, Hatsushimo
  - Destroyer Division 31 (This division was detached from CruDesron 2.)
    - Destroyer Naganami
- No.51 Special Base Force (based at Kiska)
- Attached ships for the fleet
  - Submarine Flotilla 7
    - Submarine I-2, I-4, I-5, I-6
  - Escort ship Kunashiri
  - Auxiliary seaplane tender Kimikawa Maru
  - Auxiliary oiler Nippon Maru, Teiyō Maru

=== Order of Battle at time of Leyte Gulf ===
- Cruiser Division 16 (They did not participate in the naval battle, because it was commanded to do transportation duty.)
  - Heavy cruiser Aoba, Light cruiser Kitakami, Kinu, Destroyer Uranami
- Cruiser Division 21
  - Heavy cruiser Nachi (Flagship), Ashigara
  - Light cruiser Tama (She was lent to the 3rd Fleet.)
  - Light cruiser Kiso (She did not participate in the naval battle, because it was commanded to do transportation duty.)
- Cruiser Destroyer Squadron 1
  - Light cruiser Abukuma
  - Destroyer Division 7
    - Destroyer Akebono, Ushio
  - Destroyer Division 18
    - Destroyer Shiranui, Kasumi
  - Destroyer Division 21 (It did not participate in the naval battle, because it was commanded to do transportation duty.)
    - Destroyer Hatsuharu, Wakaba, Hatsushimo

=== Order of Battle at time of Mindoro ===
- Heavy cruiser Ashigara (Flagship)
- Cruiser Destroyer Squadron 31
  - Light cruiser Isuzu
  - Destroyer Division 43
    - Destroyer Take, Ume, Momo, Sugi, Maki, Kaede
  - Destroyer Division 52
    - Destroyer Kashi, Hinoki
  - Coast Defence Division 21
    - Escort ship Manju, Kanju, Kasado, Miyake, Ikuna, Yaku
  - 933rd Naval Air Group (Based at Saiki)
- Attached ships for fleet
  - Escort ship No.21, No.22, No.29, No.31, No.43

== Commanders of the 5th Fleet ==
=== 1st Creation ===
#	Commander-in-Chief	Dates		Previous Post	Next Post	Notes
1	Vice-Admiral; Shiozawa Kōichi 塩沢幸一	1 February 1938	15 December 1938	Attendant; Navy General Staff	Director; Navy Technical Bureau	
2	Vice-Admiral; Kondō Nobutake 近藤信竹	15 December 1938	29 September 1939	Chief; Naval Operations Bureau	Attendant; Navy General Staff	
3	Vice-Admiral; Takasu Shirō 高須四郎	29 September 1939	15 November 1939	Headmaster; Naval War College	Commander-in-chief; 2nd China Expeditionary Fleet	

On 15 November 1939 the 5th Fleet was reorganized into the 2nd China Expeditionary Fleet. Command History continues there.

=== 2nd Creation ===
	Rank	Name	Date
4	Vice-Admiral	Boshirō Hosogaya	25 July 1941 – 31 March 1943
5	Vice-Admiral	Shiro Kawase	31 March 1943 – 15 February 1944
6	Vice-Admiral	Kiyohide Shima	15 February 1944 – 5 February 1945

Chief of Staff

	Rank	Name	Date
1	Vice-Admiral	Minoru Tayui	1 February 1938 – 15 December 1938
2	Vice-Admiral	Tamon Yamaguchi	15 December 1938 – 15 November 1939
3	Vice-Admiral	Tasuku Nakazawa	25 July 1941 – 6 November 1942
4	Rear-Admiral	Yoshiyuki Ichimiya	6 November 1942 – 19 March 1943
5	Rear-Admiral	Noboru Owada	10 March 1943 – 17 November 1943
6	Rear-Admiral	Takeshi Matsumoto	17 November 1943 – 5 February 1945
