= Japanese stores ship Tōkō Maru No. 2 Go =

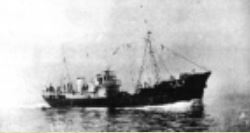
- Japanese stores ship Tōkō Maru No. 2 Go in 1938

History

Empire of Japan
- Name: Tōkō Maru No. 2 Go
- Builder: Mitsubishi Jukogyo Hikoshima Zosensho, Hikoshima shipyard
- Laid down: 12 September 1933
- Launched: 28 February 1934
- Sponsored by: Nippon Suisan
- Completed: 9 May 1934
- Acquired: requisitioned by Imperial Japanese Navy, 5 September 1941
- Stricken: 1 November 1943
- Identification: 39089
- Fate: grounded on 25 January 1943, abandoned
- Notes: Call sign: JRCJ

General characteristics
- Type: Stores ship
- Tonnage: 407 GRT
- Length: 150 ft (46 m) o/a
- Beam: 24 ft (7.3 m)
- Propulsion: diesel
- Speed: 10 knots (19 km/h; 12 mph)

Tōkō Maru No. 2 Go (Japanese: 第二號東光丸) was a Japanese fishing trawler that was requisitioned by the Imperial Japanese Navy during World War II and served as an auxiliary stores ship.

== History ==
Tōkō Maru No. 2 Go was laid down on 12 September 1933 at the Hikoshima shipyard of Mitsubishi Jukogyo Hikoshima Zosensho at the behest of shipping company, Nippon Suisan. She was launched on 28 February 1934 and completed 9 May 1934. Her sister trawlerss were stores ships Hokkai Maru and Hakurei Maru. She operated as a fishing trawler in the Bering Sea, the Yellow Sea, and the South China Sea. Requisitioned in 1937 by the Imperial Japanese Navy and converted to an auxiliary stores ship. Returned to her owners December 1938. Re-requisitioned 7 March 1939 and returned to her owners sometime after 7 April 1939. On 28 August 1941 she was re-requisitioned by the Imperial Japanese Navy, registered on 5 September and re-converted to an auxiliary stores ship and assigned to the supply unit of the IJN 5th Fleet

In May 1942, she participated in Operation "AL" - the seizure of Attu and Kiska Islands under Vice Admiral Boshirō Hosogaya as part of the supply unit for the Northern Force's Main Body consisting of auxiliary transport Akashisan Maru, oiler Fujisan Maru, and collier/oiler Nissan Maru.

On 25 January 1943, while on a replenishment voyage from Kushiro to the Aleutian Islands, she grounded herself on the north shore of Horomushiro Island in the Kuril Islands (50°39′N 155°51′E). She was abandoned as a total loss due to extreme hull tilt and struck from the Navy List on 1 November 1943.
