= Japanese cruiser Kiso =

Japanese Navy Kuma-class cruiser

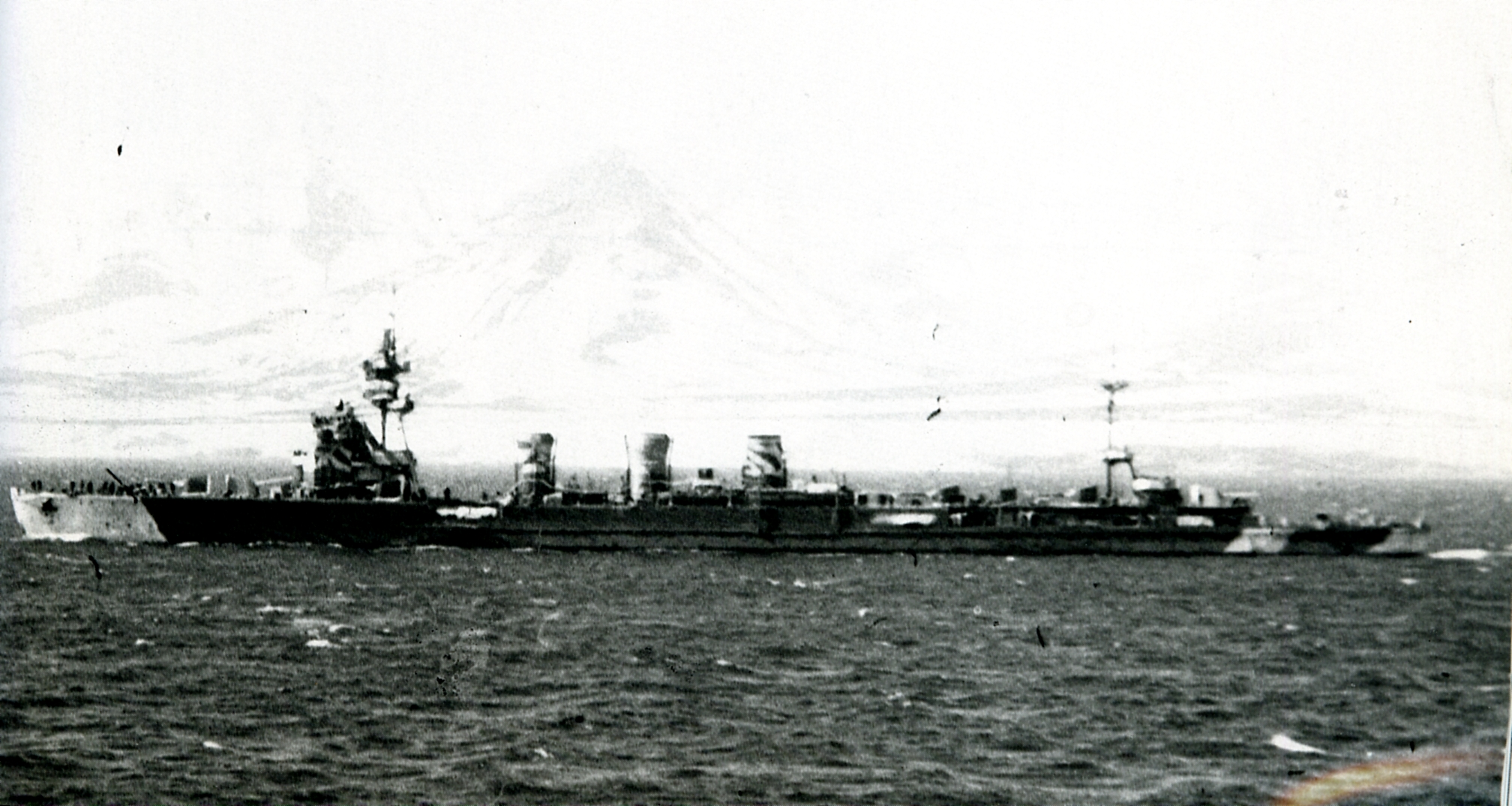
- Japanese cruiser Kiso showing Arctic camouflage during the Aleutians Campaign, 1942

History

Empire of Japan
- Name: Kiso
- Namesake: Kiso River
- Ordered: 1917 Fiscal Year
- Builder: Mitsubishi Heavy Industries, Nagasaki
- Cost: 6,915,078 JPY
- Laid down: 10 June 1919
- Launched: 14 December 1920
- Commissioned: 4 May 1921
- Stricken: 20 December 1944
- Fate: Sunk 13 November 1944

General characteristics
- Class & type: Kuma-class cruiser
- Displacement: 5,100 long tons (5,182 t) standard
- Length: 152.4 m (500 ft 0 in) o/a
- Beam: 14.2 m (46 ft 7 in)
- Draught: 4.8 m (15 ft 9 in)
- Propulsion: 4 shaft Gihon geared turbines; 12 Kampon boilers; 90,000 shp (67,000 kW)
- Speed: 36 knots (41 mph; 67 km/h)
- Range: 5,000 nautical miles (9,300 km) at 14 knots (26 km/h)
- Complement: 450
- Armament: 7 × 14 cm/50 3rd Year Type naval guns; 2 × 8 cm/40 3rd Year Type naval gun s; 8 × 533 mm (21.0 in) torpedo tubes (4x2); 48 mines
- Armor: Belt: 64 mm (3 in); Deck: 29 mm (1 in)
- Aircraft carried: 1 x floatplane, 1 catapult

Kiso (木曾) was the fifth and last of the five Kuma-class light cruisers, which served with the Imperial Japanese Navy during World War II. She was named after the Kiso River in central Honshū, Japan.

== Background ==
After the construction of the Tenryū-class cruisers, the demerits of the small cruiser concept became apparent. At the end of 1917, plans for an additional six Tenryū-class vessels, plus three new-design 7,200 ton-class scout cruisers were shelved, in place of an intermediate 5,500 ton-class vessel which could be used as both a long-range, high speed reconnaissance ship, and also as a command vessel for destroyer or submarine flotillas. Kuma was the lead ship of the five vessels in this class which were built from 1918-1921.

== Design ==
The Kuma-class vessels were essentially enlarged versions of the Tenryū-class cruisers, with greater speed, range, and weaponry.

With improvements in geared-turbine engine technology, the Kuma-class vessels were capable of the high speed of 36 knots (67 km/h), and a range of 9,000 nmi (17,000 km) at 10 kn (12 mph; 19 km/h) . The number of 14 cm/50 3rd Year Type naval guns was increased from three on the Tenryū class to seven on the Kuma class and provision was made for 48 naval mines. However, the two triple torpedo launchers on the Tenryū class were reduced to two double launchers, and the Kuma class remained highly deficient in anti-aircraft protection, with only two 8 cm/40 3rd Year Type naval guns.

Kiso was unique in her class in that she was initially built with an aircraft hangar in the front of her bridge, which made her bridge higher than that of her sister ships. Kiso was also given anti-rain caps on her two forward stacks, which gave her a unique appearance.

== Service career ==
=== Early career ===
Kiso was completed on 4 May 1921 at Mitsubishi Heavy Industries Nagasaki shipyards. Soon after completion, Kiso was fitted with both a forward and an aft flat superstructure, with a rotating floatplane take-off platform located aft for experimental and testing purposes.

Kiso was then assigned to cover the landings of Japanese troops in Siberia during Japan's Siberian Intervention against the Red Army. She was subsequently based at Port Arthur, and patrolled the China coast between the Kwantung Leased Territory and Qingdao.

By February 1929, Kiso along warships of other nations was stationed at Zhifu in order to prevent the outbreak of anti-foreigner pogroms amid the Warlord Rebellion in northeastern Shandong.

On 17 April 1939, Kiso fired a 21-gun salute as the cruiser USS Astoria arrived at Yokohama carrying the remains of Hiroshi Saito, the Japanese ambassador to the United States, who had died while on assignment to Washington D.C.

=== Operations in northern waters ===
On 10 November 1941, Kiso was assigned to CruDiv 21 in the IJN 5th Fleet under Vice Admiral Boshirō Hosogaya, and was painted in Arctic camouflage for operations in northern waters. At the time of the attack on Pearl Harbor, Kiso was patrolling in the Kuril Islands, and after suffering hull damage due to severe weather, was forced to return to Yokosuka Naval Arsenal for repairs by the end of the year. From January to end April 1942, Kiso resumed patrols in northern waters, accompanied by her sister ship, Tama.

In April, after the Doolittle Raid, Kiso was one of many vessels sent in unsuccessful pursuit of US Navy Task Force 16 with the aircraft carriers USS Hornet, and Enterprise. Shells from Kiso's main batteries scuttled guard boats No. 26 Nanshin Maru and No. 1 Iwate Maru after those vessels had been damaged by planes from Enterprise during the Doolittle Raid.

In May 1942, Kiso accompanied the converted seaplane tender Kimikawa Maru on a scouting mission to Kiska and Adak, in the Aleutian Islands. The Adak mission was successful, but Kiska was obscured by weather. On 28 May 1942, Kiso was part of the Battle of the Aleutian Islands, in "Operation AL" (the seizure of Attu and Kiska). The invasion force landed troops on Kiska on 7 June 1942, with Kiso covering. On 10 June 1942, offshore Kiska, Kiso and several other ships and a few destroyers were attacked by a formation of six USAAF B-24 Liberator bombers. Kiso was undamaged. Likewise, on 14 June 1942 Kiso was attacked by PBY Catalina flying boats, with a number of near misses. Kiso returned safely to Mutsu Bay on 24 June 1942.

On 28 June 1942, Kiso and Tama participated in the second reinforcement convoy to Kiska, then patrolled southwest of Kiska in anticipation of an American counter-attack, returning to Yokosuka Naval District on 16 July 1942. From 16 July - 2 August 1942, after refit at Yokosuka, Kiso returned north to patrol around Kiska, and covered the transfer of the Attu garrison to Kiska on 20 August 1942, returning to Ōminato Guard District on 18 September 1942. Kiso continued a series of patrol and resupply missions to the Kuriles and Aleutians from October through the end of March 1943.

On 28 March 1943, Vice Admiral Shiro Kawase assumed command of the IJN 5th Fleet. Kiso was sent to dry dock on 4 April 1943 for a major refit, during which its 900 mm (35 in) searchlights were replaced by three Type 96 1,100 mm (43 in) searchlights. Two Type 96 twin-mount 25-mm AA guns were added at port and starboard above the aft torpedo-tube mounts. She was also fitted with a Type 21 air-search radar.

On 11 May 1943, Kiso was sent with the destroyers Hatsushimo and Wakaba to escort Kimikawa Maru transporting eight Mitsubishi F1M2 ("Pete") Type 0 observation floatplanes and two Nakajima A6M2-N ("Rufe") fighter floatplanes of the 452nd Kōkūtai to Attu. However, the Americans invaded and retook Attu the same day, and the mission was scrubbed. Kiso was sent instead on 21 May 1943 to assist in the evacuation of Japanese forces from Kiska. After several attempts due to poor weather, Kiso managed to evacuate 1,189 troops from Kiska on 29 July 1943. The ship continued its patrols in the area until the end of August.

=== Operations in southern waters ===
On 15 September 1943, Kiso was reassigned south, and ferried troops from Ponape, Caroline Islands to Truk, arriving 23 September 1943 and returning to Kure Naval District on 4 October 1943.

Likewise, on 12 October 1943, Kiso and Tama embarked troops in Shanghai. Kiso had a narrow escape from the submarine USS Grayback while in the East China Sea, but safely arrived at Truk on 18 October 1943. From Truk, Kiso was assigned to carry the troops further, to Rabaul, New Britain. On 21 October 1943, 53 miles (85 km) from Cape St. George, the cruisers were attacked by RAAF Bristol Beaufort bombers from Guadalcanal. Kiso sustained a direct hit by a 250 lb (113 kg) bomb. The damage was severe enough to force a return to Maizuru Naval Arsenal for repairs. After arriving at Maizuru on 10 November 1943, Kiso was also modified by having her two 140-mm gun mounts removed and replaced by a dual 127-mm HA gun mount. Three triple mount and six single mount Type 96 25-mm AA guns were also installed bringing their total to 19 (3x3, 2x2, 6x1).

After modifications were completed on 3 March 1944, Kiso returned to northern waters on patrol duties for the following three months. However, on 30 June 1944, Kiso and Tama were sent from Yokosuka with Imperial Japanese Army reinforcements to Ogasawara Islands, returning on 3 July 1944. Kiso was then kept in the Seto Inland Sea from 10 August 1944 for training and guard duties.

With the invasion of Leyte starting 20 October 1944, Kiso was ordered south, but was still at Kure taking on a resupply of ammunition for Vice Admiral Kurita's fleet at the time of the Battle off Samar on 25 October 1944. After departing Sasebo with the aircraft carrier Jun'yō and DesDiv 30's Uzuki, Yūzuki and Akikaze, Kiso was spotted 160 miles (260 km) west of Cape Bolinao, Luzon, Philippines by the submarine USS Pintado. Pintado was accompanied by fellow submarines Jallao and Atule and was working in close cooperation with Haddock, Halibut and Tuna. Pintado fired all six of its bow torpedoes, but one of the Japanese destroyers came between the carrier and cruisers, sacrificing itself.

Admiral Kurita's ammunition was unloaded by 8 November 1944, whereupon Kiso, together with Jun'yō, cruisers Tone, Haguro and Ashigara, DesDiv 30's Uzuki and Yūzuki following the battleships Yamato, Kongō and Nagato, light cruiser Yahagi with DesDiv 17's Hamakaze, Isokaze and the Yukikaze returned towards Japan. Kiso, Jun'yō, Tone and DesDiv 30 were detached to Manila instead. Kiso became the flagship of the Fifth Fleet, replacing Abukuma.

On 13 November 1944, on the threat of American carrier strikes on Luzon, Kiso was ordered to return to Brunei that evening carrying Vice Admiral Kiyohide Shima. Before she could leave for Brunei, she was attacked on 13 November while underway in Manila Bay by more than 350 carrier planes of Task Force 38's carrier task groups 38.1's Hornet, Monterey and Cowpens, TG 38.3's Essex, Ticonderoga and Langley and TG 38.4's Enterprise and San Jacinto. Three bombs hit Kiso to starboard - one in the bow, one near her boiler rooms and one near her aft gun mounts. Kiso sank in shallow water 13 kilometres (7.0 nmi; 8.1 mi) west of Cavite at 14°35′N 120°50′E. Captain Ryonosuke Imamura and 103 of her crew survived, but 175 crewmen went down with the ship.

Kiso was removed from the navy list on 20 March 1945. After the war, her wreck was salvaged on 15 December 1955, by the Nippon Salvage Company, and refloated into Manila Harbor for breaking up.
