= Japanese destroyer Akebono (1930) =

Fubuki-class destroyer

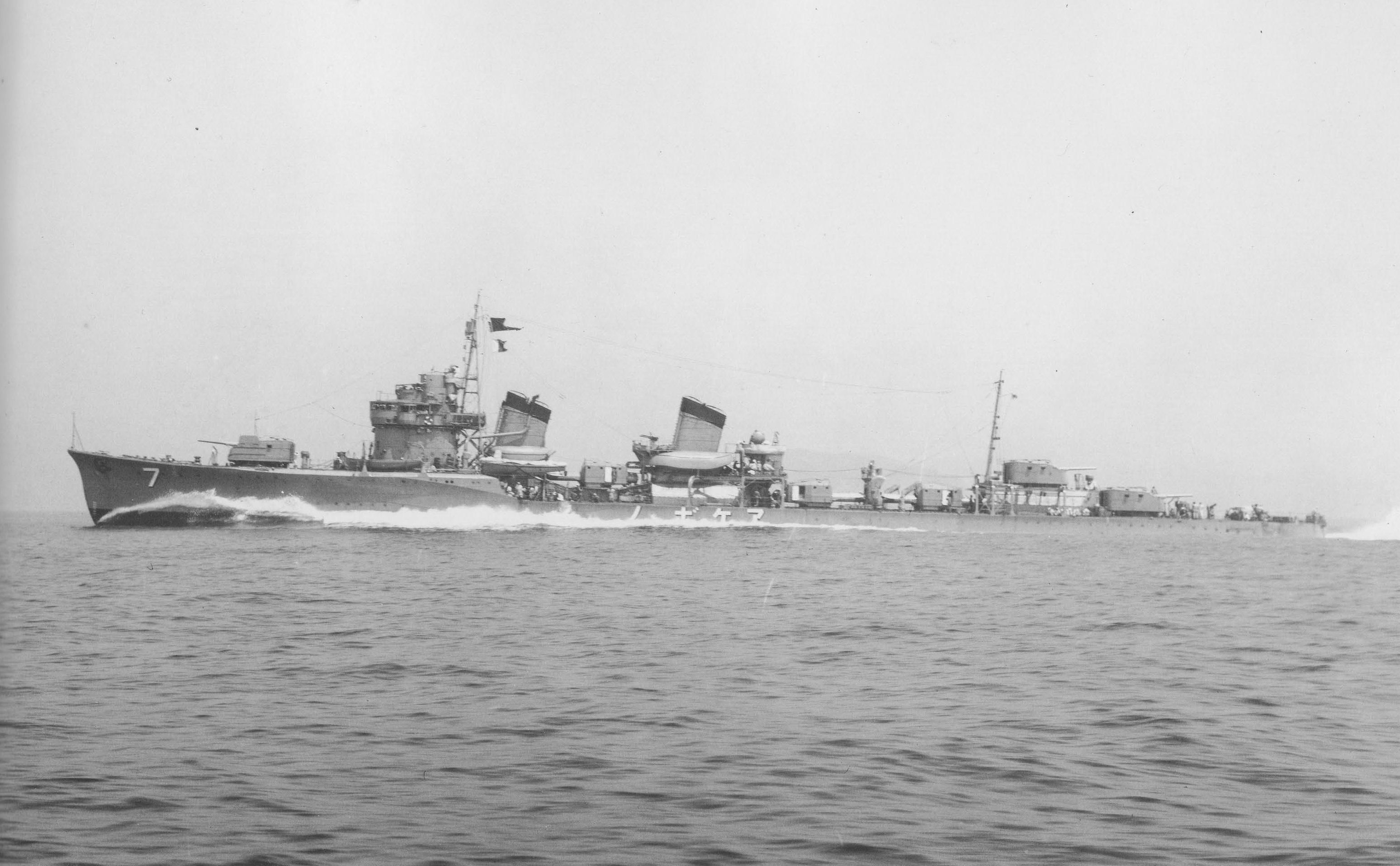
- Akebono underway on 29 July 1936.

History

Empire of Japan
- Name: Akebono
- Namesake: Japanese destroyer Akebono (1899)
- Ordered: 1923 Fiscal Year
- Builder: Fujinagata Shipyards
- Yard number: Destroyer No. 52
- Laid down: 25 November 1929
- Launched: 7 November 1930
- Commissioned: 31 July 1931
- Stricken: 10 January 1945
- Fate: Sunk in air raid near Manila, the Philippines, 14 November 1944

General characteristics
- Class & type: Fubuki-class destroyer
- Displacement: 1,750 long tons (1,780 t) standard; 2,050 long tons (2,080 t) re-built
- Length: 111.96 m (367.3 ft) pp; 115.3 m (378 ft) waterline; 118.41 m (388.5 ft) overall
- Beam: 10.4 m (34 ft 1 in)
- Draft: 3.2 m (10 ft 6 in)
- Propulsion: 4 × Kampon type boilers; 2 × Kampon Type Ro geared turbines; 2 × shafts at 50,000 ihp (37,000 kW)
- Speed: 38 knots (44 mph; 70 km/h)
- Range: 5,000 nmi (9,300 km) at 14 knots (26 km/h)
- Complement: 219
- Armament: 6 × Type 3 127 mm 50 caliber naval guns (3×2); up to 22 × Type 96 25 mm AT/AA Guns; up to 10 × 13 mm AA guns; 9 × 610 mm (24 in) torpedo tubes; 36 × depth charges

Service record
- Operations: Second Sino-Japanese War; Invasion of French Indochina; Battle of the Java Sea; Battle of the Coral Sea; Battle of Midway; Solomon Islands campaign; Battle of Surigao Strait

Akebono (曙, "Daybreak") was the eighteenth of twenty-four Fubuki-class destroyers, built for the Imperial Japanese Navy following World War I.

== History ==
Construction of the advanced Fubuki-class destroyers was authorized as part of the Imperial Japanese Navy's expansion program from fiscal 1923, intended to give Japan a qualitative edge with the world's most modern ships. The Fubuki class had performance that was a quantum leap over previous destroyer designs, so much so that they were designated Special Type destroyers (特型, Tokugata). The large size, powerful engines, high speed, large radius of action and unprecedented armament gave these destroyers the firepower similar to many light cruisers in other navies. Akebono, built at the Fujinagata Shipyards in Osaka was the seventh in an improved series, which incorporated a modified gun turret which could elevate her main battery of Type 3 127 mm 50 caliber naval guns to 75° as opposed to the original 40°, thus permitting the guns to be used as dual-purpose guns against aircraft. Akebono was laid down on 25 October 1929, launched on 7 November 1930 and commissioned on 31 July 1931. Originally assigned hull designation "Destroyer No. 52", she was named Akebono before her launch.

== Operational history ==
On completion, Akebono was assigned to Destroyer Division 7 under the IJN 2nd Fleet. During the Second Sino-Japanese War, from 1937, Ayanami covered landing of Japanese forces in Shanghai and Hangzhou. From 1940, she was assigned to patrol and cover landings of Japanese forces in south China and participated in the Invasion of French Indochina.

=== World War II history ===
At the time of the attack on Pearl Harbor, Akebono was assigned to Destroyer Division 7 of the IJN 1st Air Fleet, but was unable to participate in the attack due to a damaged propeller, and was held in reserve in Japanese home waters as a guard vessel. Repairs completed by mid-January 1942, Akebono was part of the escort for the aircraft carriers Hiryū and Sōryū during air strikes against Ambon. She was later part of the escort for the cruisers Nachi and Haguro during "Operation J" (the Japanese invasion of the eastern Netherlands East Indies). On 1 March, at the Battle of the Java Sea, Akebono assisted in sinking the British cruiser HMS Exeter and destroyer HMS Encounter, and the American destroyer USS Pope. She returned to Yokosuka Naval Arsenal for repairs at the end of March.

At the end of April, Akebono escorted Myōkō and Haguro to Truk, and subsequently joined Admiral Takeo Takagi's force at the Battle of the Coral Sea. At the end of May, she escorted Zuikaku from Truk back to Kure Naval Arsenal.

During the Battle of Midway in early June, Akebono was part the diversionary force in "Operation AL" that attacked Dutch Harbor, Alaska in the Aleutians campaign, and returned to Yokosuka in early July.

On 14 July, Akebono was reassigned to the Combined Fleet, and escorted the battleship Yamato and aircraft carrier Taiyō at the Battle of the Eastern Solomons on 24 August. Akebono remained assigned to Taiyō through September, and to the aircraft carrier Unyō from October to February 1943. Through the rest of 1943, Akebono continued to serve as an escort for Unyō, Taiyō, Ryūhō, Zuihō or Jun'yō in various missions throughout the Pacific, except for a period in December when she was assigned to "Tokyo Express" transport missions in the Solomon Islands.

On 1 January 1944, Akebono was reassigned to the IJN 5th Fleet. On 14 January, she rescued 89 survivors of torpedoed destroyer Sazanami en route to Truk. Returning to Yokosuka for repairs and refit on 25 January, she was reassigned to Ōminato Guard District for patrols of northern waters through October. However, as the situation continued to deteriorate for Japan in the Philippines, she was reassigned to Admiral Kiyohide Shima's Diversionary Force at the Battle of Surigao Strait on 24 October. The following day, Akebono rescued about 700 survivors of the heavy cruiser Mogami and then scuttled her with a torpedo.

On 13 November 1944, Akebono, while alongside destroyer Akishimo at Cavite pier near Manila, was attacked in a USAAF air raid. A direct bomb hit set both ships ablaze, and the following day a large explosion on Akishimo blew a hole in Akebono, which sank upright in shallow water at position 14°35′N 120°55′E, with 48 crewmen killed and 43 wounded.

On 10 January 1945, Akebono was removed from the navy list.

== See also ==
- Akebono-class destroyer escort
