= Japanese cruiser Abukuma =

Imperial Japanese Navy light cruiser

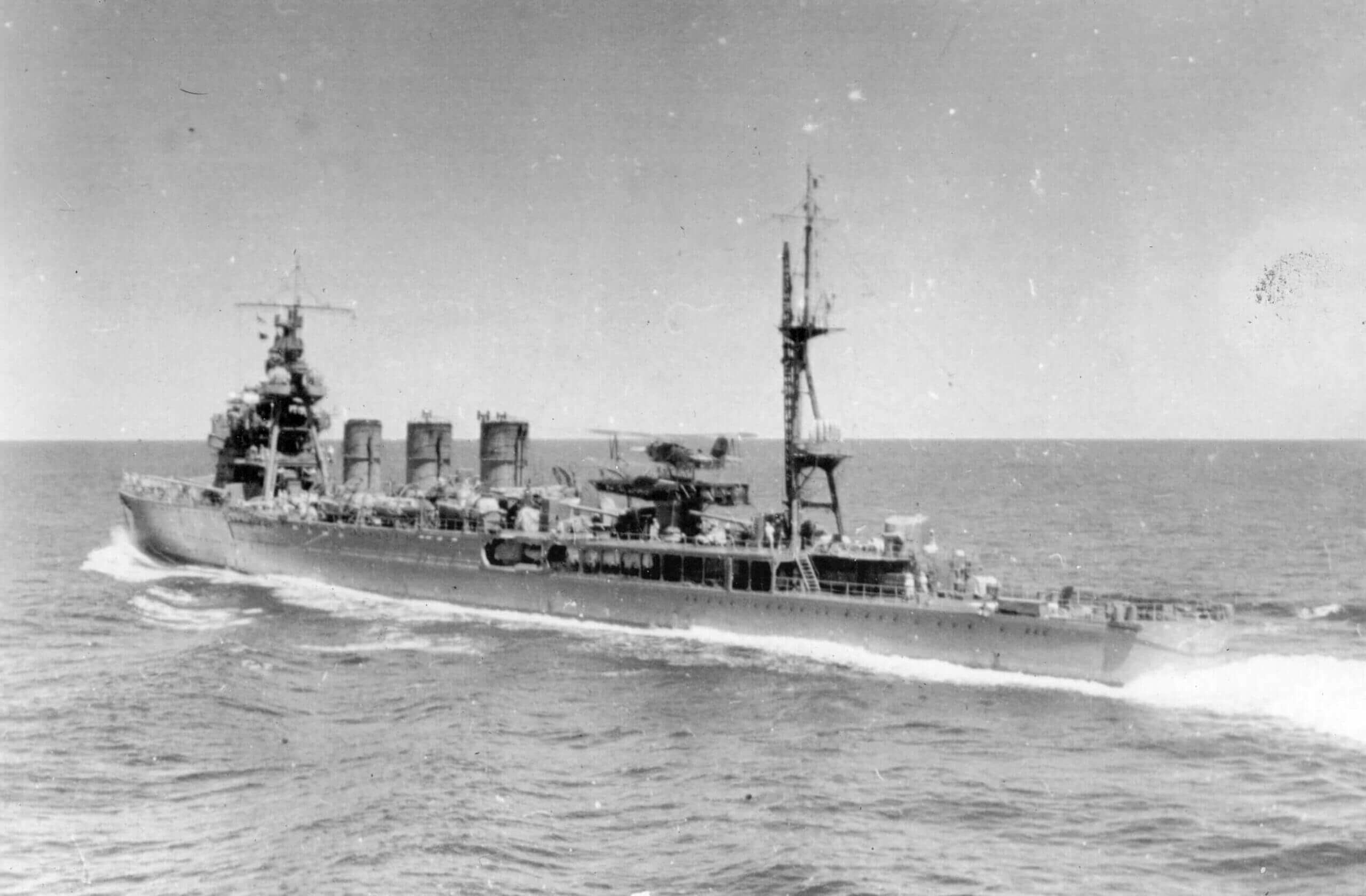
- Abukuma in 1941, showing Kawanishi E7K1 "Alf" floatplane on catapult, ready to launch

History

Empire of Japan
- Name: Abukuma
- Ordered: 1920 Fiscal Year (1918 “8-6 Fleet” Plan)
- Builder: Uraga Dock Company
- Laid down: 8 December 1921
- Launched: 16 March 1923
- Commissioned: 26 May 1925
- Stricken: 20 December 1944
- Fate: Sunk 26 October 1944

General characteristics
- Class & type: Nagara-class cruiser
- Displacement: 5,570 long tons (5,659 t) normal
- Length: 162.1 m (531 ft 10 in) o/a; 158.6 m (520 ft 4 in) w/l
- Beam: 14.2 m (46 ft 7 in)
- Draft: 4.8 m (15 ft 9 in)
- Propulsion: 4 shaft Gihon geared turbines; 12 Kampon boilers; 90,000 shp (67,000 kW)
- Speed: 36 knots (41 mph; 67 km/h)
- Range: 6,000 nmi (11,000 km) at 14 kn (26 km/h)
- Complement: 450
- Sensors & processing systems: Type 21 air-search radar
- Armament: (Initial); 7 × 14 cm/50 3rd Year Type naval guns; 2 × 8 cm/40 3rd Year Type naval gun s; 8 × 533 mm (21.0 in) torpedo tubes (4x2); 48 naval mines; (Final) 5 × 14 cm/50 3rd Year Type naval guns; 2 × 12.7 cm/40 Type 89 naval gun s; 4 × triple, 2x twin,24x single Type 96 25 mm AA guns; 10 × Type 93 13.2 mm machine guns; 8 × 533 mm (21.0 in) torpedo tubes (2x4)
- Armor: Belt: 60 mm (2.4 in); Deck: 30 mm (1.2 in)
- Aircraft carried: 1 x floatplane
- Aviation facilities: 1x aircraft catapult

Abukuma (阿武隈) was the sixth and last of the Nagara class of light cruisers completed for the Imperial Japanese Navy (IJN), and like other vessels of her class, she was intended for use as the flagship of a destroyer flotilla. She was named after the Abukuma River in the Tōhoku region of Japan. She saw action during World War II in the Attack on Pearl Harbor and in the Pacific, before being disabled in the Battle of Surigao Strait in October 1944, then bombed and sunk by the United States Army Air Forces (USAAF) off the coast of the Philippines.

== Background ==
Following the production of the five Kuma-class cruisers, an additional three 5,500-ton class light cruisers authorized under the 8-4 Fleet Program were ordered by the Imperial Japanese Navy in 1920. Due to minor changes in design, primarily due to advances in torpedo technology, these three vessels were initially designated as “modified Kuma-class”, or “5500-ton class Type II”, before being re-designated as a separate class named after the lead vessel, Nagara. A second set of three vessels was authorized in late 1920.

== Design ==
The Nagara-class vessels were essentially identical to the previous Kuma-class cruisers, retaining the same hull design, engines and main weaponry, with the addition of the new 610 mm Type 93 Long Lance Torpedoes, which required a larger launcher. However, in silhouette, a major difference from the Kuma class was in the configuration of the bridge, which incorporated an aircraft hangar. Initially, a 33-foot platform was mounted above the No.2 turret, extending over the forward superstructure below the bridge. This was later replaced by an aircraft catapult. Even so, the arrangement proved unwieldy, and the catapult was moved to the rear of each ship in the class, between the No.5 and No.6 turrets during retrofits in 1929-1934. Abukuma and Kinu, were scheduled to receive the new Type 93 torpedoes in early 1941. However, shortages meant that only Abukuma was refitted quadruple mounts in place of the aft twin mounts between March and May 1941, and her forward twin mounts were removed. Abukuma carried sixteen Type 93 torpedoes, including eight reloads. Abukuma was also the first vessel in her class to receive radar (in 1943).

== Construction and career ==
=== Early career ===
Abukuma was laid down on 8 December 1921, launched on 16 March 1923 and completed at the Uraga Dock Company on 26 May 1925, her commissioning having been delayed due to the Great Kantō earthquake. From November 1927 to December 1928, she was under the command of Captain Teijirō Toyoda.

On 20 October 1930, during large-scale fleet maneuvers, Abukuma rammed the cruiser Kitakami between her No.2 and No.3 funnels. The collision only lightly damaged Kitakami, but Abukuma lost her bow and had to be towed by the battleship Mutsu to Tateyama, Chiba, and from there she was returned to Yokosuka Naval Arsenal by tugboats. Repairs with a temporary bow were completed by 22 November 1930, but a permanent bow with a slightly different design was refitted at Kure Naval Arsenal from 1 April to 30 December 1931. From December 1931 to November 1932, she was under the command of Captain Seiichi Iwamura.

In 1932, Abukuma was assigned to the Japanese Third Fleet and assigned to patrols off the coast of northern China after the Manchurian Incident. As the situation with China continued to deteriorate, Abukuma was assigned to provide coverage for Japanese transports during the Battle of Shanghai, and remained on station patrolling the China coast and the Yangtze River through 1938. Her anti-aircraft weaponry was upgraded in 1933 and 1936, and her torpedo launchers in 1938. From November 1934 to November 1935, she was under the command of Captain Takeo Kurita.

=== Early stages of the Pacific War ===
Abukuma set sail from Hitokappu Bay on Etorofu in the Kurile Islands on 26 November 1941 with Vice Admiral Chuichi Nagumo's Carrier Striking Force. She served as the flagship of Rear Admiral Sentarō Ōmori's Destroyer Squadron 1 ("DesRon1"), consisting of the destroyers Shiranui, Arare, Kagerō, Kasumi, Tanikaze, Hamakaze, Isokaze, and Urakaze.

DesRon1 served as the anti-submarine escort for the six aircraft carriers (Akagi,Kaga, Sōryū, Hiryū, Shōkaku, Zuikaku), two battleships (Hiei and Kirishima) and two heavy cruisers (Tone and Chikuma) that carried the offensive power of the Carrier Striking Force. Nearly 360 aircraft were launched against Pearl Harbor on 7 December 1941, inflicting heavy damage: sinking four American battleships, damaging three others, destroying more than 100 aircraft. After the attack on Pearl Harbor, Abukuma led DesRon1 with most of the Carrier Striking Force on the return to Japan, and received a hero's welcome on 23 December 1941.

=== Actions in the South Pacific ===
In January 1942, DesRon1 escorted the Japanese invasion fleet for the invasion of Rabaul, New Britain and Kavieng, New Ireland from its forward base at Truk in the Caroline Islands.

In early February, DesRon1 accompanied the Carrier Striking Force in an unsuccessful pursuit of Vice Admiral William F. Halsey Jr's Task Force 8, after the aircraft carrier USS Enterprise raided Kwajalein and Wotje in the Marshall Islands. Abukuma was then ordered to Palau, from which it accompanied the Carrier Striking Force on the attack on Port Darwin, Australia.

At the end of February and into April, DesRon1 escorted the Carrier Striking Force in attacks on Java in the Dutch East Indies, and Colombo and Trincomalee in Ceylon and against other targets in the Indian Ocean, including the Royal Navy aircraft carrier HMS Hermes as part of the Indian Ocean raids. The fleet returned to Singapore on 11 April 1942.

=== Battle of the Aleutian Islands ===
In May, Abukuma and its destroyer squadron were reassigned to the Northern Force under Vice Admiral Boshirō Hosogaya, and escorted the light aircraft carriers Ryūjō and Jun'yō, supporting the invasion of Attu and Kiska in the Battle of the Aleutian Islands.

In June and July, DesRon1 returned to Japan to escort a convoy of reinforcements to the two freshly captured islands in the Aleutians. After uneventful patrolling in the Aleutian Islands and Kurile Islands, DesRon1 escorted three more reinforcement and supply convoys to the Aleutians in October, November and December.

Abukuma returned to Sasebo Naval Arsenal for refit on 12 December 1942, during which time two triple-mount Type 96 25 mm AA guns were installed, and the No. 5 14 cm/50 3rd Year Type naval gun and the quad 13.2 mm machine gun mount in front of the bridge were replaced by a twin 13.2 mm machine gun mount. After refit, Abukuma returned to northern waters to continue reinforcement operations to Attu and Kiska in January, February and March 1943.

Abukuma participated in the Battle of the Komandorski Islands on 26 March 1943, during which time she fired 95 rounds from her 140mm guns and four torpedoes. Abukuma was undamaged during the battle, but the heavy cruiser Nachi was badly damaged and the Japanese Fifth Fleet was forced to abort its supply mission to the Aleutians. The fleet commander, Vice Admiral Hosogaya, disgraced because he had been forced to withdraw by the weaker American fleet, was forced to retire.

From April through May 1943, Abukuma underwent refit at the Maizuru Naval Arsenal, during which time a Type 21 air-search radar was installed, and it was thus not present during "Operation Landcrab", during which American forces recaptured Attu.

In July, Abukuma and DesRon1 provided support for the evacuation of Kiska. On 26 July 1943, the kaibokan Kunashiri collided with Abukuma, hitting her starboard quarter, but causing little damage. On 12 September 1943, while cruising off Paramushiro, Abukuma suffered slight damage by near misses by bombs from USAAF B-24 Liberator and B-25 Mitchell aircraft.

In dry dock once again at Yokosuka from October through November 1943, Abukuma's No. 7 gun mount was removed, and a twin mount of 40 caliber Type 89 127 mm HA guns (unshielded) was fitted, as was a triple-mount Type 96 25 mm AA gun and four single-mount 25 mm AA guns. After refit, Abukuma returned to northern waters in December for antisubmarine patrol off Hokkaidō and the Kurile Islands to June.

On 21 June 1944, during yet another refit at Yokosuka Naval Arsenal, a Type 22 surface-search radar was fitted, together with ten more single-mount Type 96 25 mm AA guns. Five single-mount Type 93 13.2 mm machine guns were also added. Work was completed by 13 July 1944, after which Abukuma had a total of thirty 25-mm and ten 13-mm AA guns.

=== Battle of Surigao Strait ===
Abukuma remained in Japanese home waters through the middle of October 1944, when she was reassigned to sortie with its seven destroyers against the U.S. fleet off Taiwan in October 1944. However, she was re-directed from Mako in the Pescadores to Manila to support Vice Admiral Shoji Nishimura against the U.S. Navy in the Philippines. Abukuma was joined by the heavy cruisers Nachi, Ashigara and seven destroyers in a flotilla commanded by Vice Admiral Kiyohide Shima. During 15–22 October, this flotilla was spotted by six different American submarines, but only one was able to maneuver close enough to fire torpedoes: USS Seadragon. The flotilla was cruising at 19 knots (35 km/h) and zigzagging through the Luzon Strait on 22 October. Seadragon fired four torpedoes through her stern tubes, but all missed. All six submarines reported the flotilla's course, position and speed to American fleet units approaching the area.

Abukuma met her fate at the Battle of Surigao Strait, part of the overall campaign of four naval battles collectively referred to as the Battle of Leyte Gulf. In the pre-dawn hours of 25 October 1944, as Shima's force entered the strait, the flotilla was attacked by a squadron of American PT boats. Lieutenant (jg) Mike Kovar's PT-137 fired a torpedo at a destroyer, but it ran deep and passed beneath the target to strike Abukuma at 0325 near the No. 1 boiler room, killing 37 crewmen.

Abukuma was disabled and fell behind the rest of the flotilla, but after emergency repairs, was able to get under way and by 0445, she was making 20 knots (37 km/h). By 0535, Abukuma had caught up to the rest of the flotilla. However, she was down at the bow and shipping at least 500 tons of seawater; at 0830 she was ordered to Dapitan for repairs, escorted by the destroyer Ushio.

On 26 October, Abukuma and Ushio departed Dapitan for Coron, Palawan but was spotted and attacked repeatedly by B-24 Liberator bombers of the 5th Group, 13th Air Force armed with 500 lb (227 kg) bombs. At 1006 she took a direct hit near the No. 3 14-centimetre (5.5 in) gun mount; at 1020 two more hits by B-24 bombers of the 33rd Squadron 22nd Group, 5th Air Force were scored further aft that started fires. The fire spread to the engine rooms and aft torpedo rooms. Power was lost and the ship's speed decreased. At 1037, four Type 93 "Long Lance" torpedoes in the aft torpedo room exploded with devastating effect. The crew abandoned ship between 1200 and 1230 off Negros Island. At 1242, she sank by the stern at 09°20′N 122°32′E with 250 of her crew. Ushio rescued her captain and 283 crewmen.

Abukuma was removed from the Navy List on 20 December 1944.
