= Nissan Maru =

Japanese cargo ship

Coordinates: 51.966667°N 177.666667°E

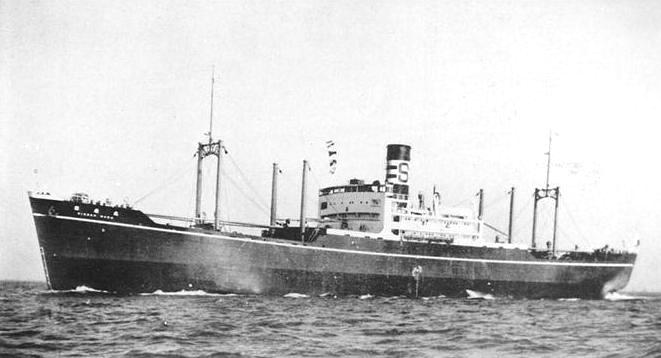
- A prewar photograph of the Nissan Maru

History
- Name: Nissan Maru
- Owner: Nissan Kisen KK (1938–1941)
- Operator: Nissan Kisen KK (1938–1941); Imperial Japanese Navy (1941–1942)
- Port of registry: (Empire of Japan) Tokyo, Japan (1938–1941); Imperial Japanese Navy (1941–1942)
- Builder: Osaka Iron Works
- Laid down: 30 June 1938
- Launched: 6 November 1938
- Completed: 15 January 1939
- Identification: Japanese Official Number 45503; Code Letters JZLM
- Fate: Sunk by United States Army Air Forces airstrike, 19 June 1942

General characteristics
- Class & type: Koshin Maru-class auxiliary transport
- Type: Cargo (civilian service); collier/oiler (military service)
- Tonnage: 6,534 GRT, 3,887 NRT
- Length: 424.1 feet (129.3 m)
- Beam: 57.4 feet (17.5 m)
- Depth: 34.4 feet (10.5 m)
- Installed power: Geared steam turbine
- Propulsion: Single screw propeller
- Speed: 17 knots (31 km/h) (maximum)

Nissan Maru (Japanese: 日産丸) was a Japanese cargo ship completed in 1939 owned by Nissan Kisen K.K. that was requisitioned for service as an auxiliary collier and oiler by the Imperial Japanese Navy during World War II. She served with the 5th Fleet and was sunk by United States Army Air Forces bombers during the Japanese occupation of Kiska in the Aleutian Islands Campaign.

== Building and civilian service ==
The vessel was laid down on 30 June 1938 by the Osaka Iron Works at its shipyard for Nissan Kisen K.K.. Launched on 6 November of that year and named Nissan Maru, she was completed and registered at Tokyo on 15 January 1939. Nissan Maru was a 6,534 GRT cargo ship with a net register tonnage of 3,887. She was equipped with a direction finder, and had two decks with a cruiser stern. She had a length of 424.1 feet, a beam of 57.4 feet, and a depth of 34.4 feet. The ship was powered by two oil-burning Hitachi steam turbines double reduction geared to one screw shaft rated at 500 NHP.

On 19 July 1939, while steaming down the Huangpu River at Shanghai, she suffered a twisted bow after colliding with the SS President Coolidge while the latter was tied up at a pier. No injuries occurred on either ship.

== Military service ==
On 9 September 1941, as Japan prepared to enter World War II, Nissan Maru was requisitioned by the Imperial Japanese Navy. She became an auxiliary collier and oiler attached to the Maizuru Naval District, homeported at Maizuru on 20 September. On the same day the auxiliary was assigned to the 5th Fleet, and Captain Sakuma Takao was appointed its supervisor. The vessel began conversion to military service on 24 September at the Osaka Iron Works shipyard; the conversion was finished on 15 October. On 25 November Sakuma was relieved by Captain Naotsuka Hachiro, and on the next day she departed Yokosuka. Nissan Maru spent the next months on duty around Hokkaido and the Kuriles, before arriving at Chichijima on 23 January 1942. On 28 January she returned to Yokosuka, before being assigned to supply the Aleutian Islands Campaign invasion force on 1 February.

On 7 March she was assigned to transport ammunition by the 5th Fleet, with an additional personnel transport mission being added on 17 March. In April she was fitted with fourteen Daihatsu-class landing craft, as well as a rangefinder and related equipment in May. On 5 May Nissan Maru was assigned to the operation for the seizure of Attu and Kiska; Naotsuka was relieved by Captain Ishii Saburo on 15 May. She arrived at Mutsu Bay in preparation for the invasion on 22 May, but was transferred to Kawauchi Bay on 26 May. She was briefly diverted to the Kuriles, and unloaded 200 tons of coal at Attu on 10 June. Nissan Maru arrived at Kiska on 12 June and unloaded her cargo.

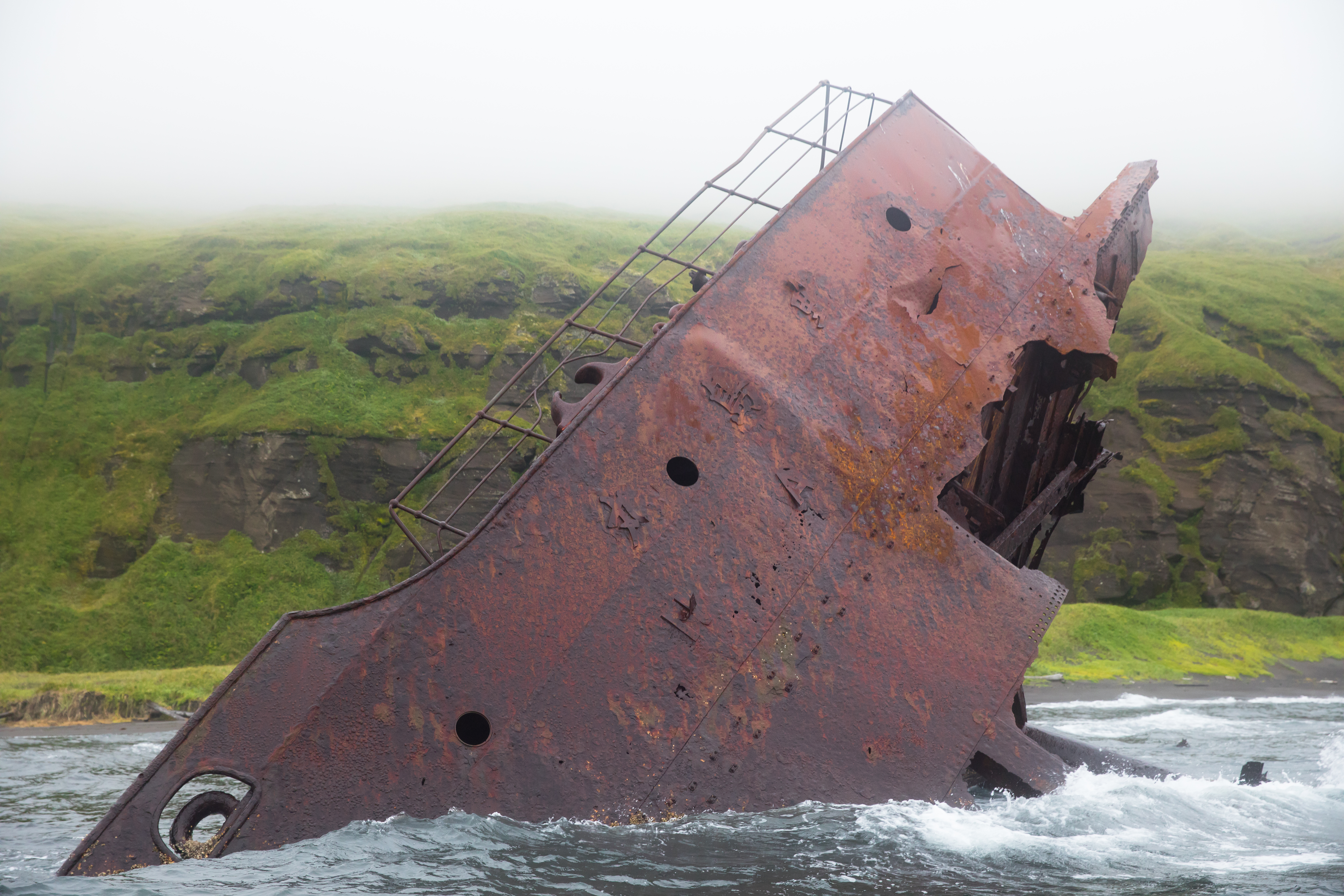
Wreck of the Nissan Maru, 2017

At 08:30 on 15 June, still at Kiska, she was heavily damaged by several bomb hits during an airstrike of United States Army Air Forces Eleventh Air Force Boeing B-17 Flying Fortress and Consolidated B-24 Liberator heavy bombers, killing one crewman. She sank in Kiska Harbor at 07:00 on 19 June 1942 after being hit in a 05:00 air strike composed of three B-17s, four B-24s, and one Consolidated LB-30 from the Eleventh Air Force. The mission that sank her was the first combat mission of the 36th Bombardment Squadron, led by Major Russell A. Cone. The wreck of the Nissan Maru was identified and filmed by the National Park Service's Submerged Cultural Resources Unit after the program began in 1989.
