= Japanese destroyer Kazagumo =

Yūgumo-class destroyer

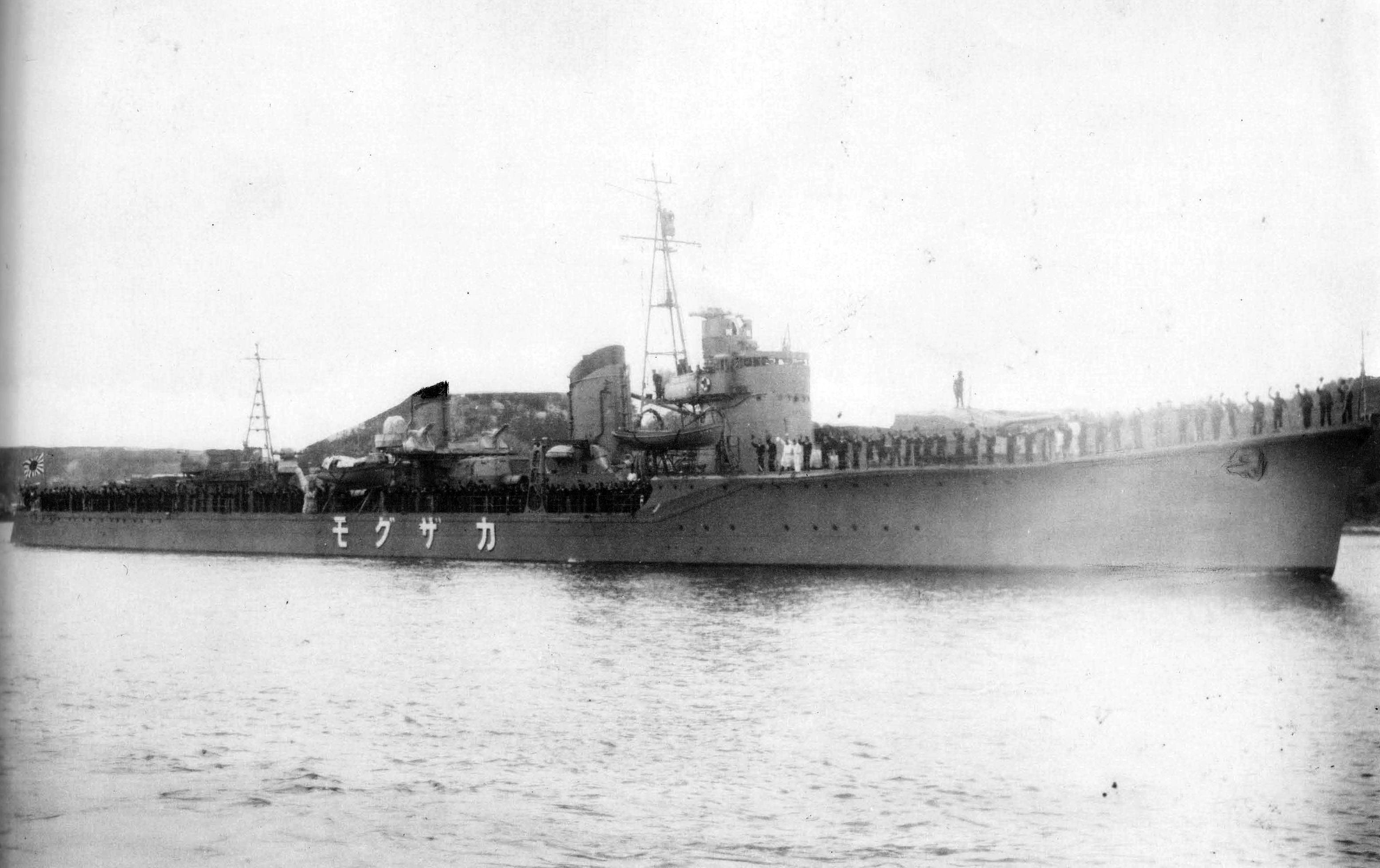
- Kazagumo on 28 March 1942

History

Empire of Japan
- Name: Kazagumo
- Builder: Uraga Dock Company
- Laid down: 23 December 1940
- Launched: 26 September 1941
- Completed: 28 March 1942
- Stricken: 10 July 1944
- Fate: Torpedoed and sunk, 8 June 1944

General characteristics
- Class & type: Yūgumo-class destroyer
- Displacement: 2,520 long tons (2,560 t)
- Length: 119.15 m (390 ft 11 in)
- Beam: 10.8 m (35 ft 5 in)
- Draught: 3.75 m (12 ft 4 in)
- Speed: 35 knots (40 mph; 65 km/h)
- Complement: 228
- Armament: 6 × 127 mm (5.0 in)/50 caliber DP guns; up to 28 × Type 96 25 mm (0.98 in) AA guns; up to 4 × 13.2 mm (0.52 in) AA guns; 8 × 610 mm (24 in) torpedo tubes for Type 93 torpedoes; 36 depth charges

Kazagumo (風雲, Wind and Clouds) was a Yūgumo-class destroyer of the Imperial Japanese Navy.

== Design and description ==
The Yūgumo class was a repeat of the preceding Kagerō class with minor improvements that increased their anti-aircraft capabilities. Their crew numbered 228 officers and enlisted men. The ships measured 119.17 meters (391 ft 0 in) overall, with a beam of 10.8 meters (35 ft 5 in) and a draft of 3.76 meters (12 ft 4 in). They displaced 2,110 metric tons (2,080 long tons) at standard load and 2,560 metric tons (2,520 long tons) at deep load. The ships had two Kampon geared steam turbines, each driving one propeller shaft, using steam provided by three Kampon water-tube boilers. The turbines were rated at a total of 52,000 shaft horsepower (39,000 kW) for a designed speed of 35 knots (65 km/h; 40 mph).

The main armament of the Yūgumo class consisted of six Type 3 127-millimeter (5.0 in) guns in three twin-gun turrets, one superfiring pair aft and one turret forward of the superstructure. The guns were able to elevate up to 75° to increase their ability against aircraft, but their slow rate of fire, slow traversing speed, and the lack of any sort of high-angle fire-control system meant that they were virtually useless as anti-aircraft guns. They were built with four Type 96 25-millimeter (1.0 in) anti-aircraft guns in two twin-gun mounts, but more of these guns were added over the course of the war. The ships were also armed with eight 610-millimeter (24.0 in) torpedo tubes in a two quadruple traversing mounts; one reload was carried for each tube. Their anti-submarine weapons comprised two depth charge throwers for which 36 depth charges were carried.

== Construction and career ==
During the Battle of Midway Kazagumo was assigned to Admiral Nagumo's Strike Force. After the fleet had been attacked, the destroyer assisted in rescuing the survivors of the sinking aircraft carriers. In the Battle of the Eastern Solomons the ship was assigned to Nagumo's Strike Force.

In the Battle of the Santa Cruz Islands the destroyer was assigned to Vanguard Force. She performed troop transport runs to Guadalcanal from 7–10 November 1942. During the Naval Battle of Guadalcanal Kazagumo was assigned to the Bombardment Force, and assisted in the rescue of survivors from the cruiser Kinugasa. The ship returned to doing troop transport runs; on 17 November to Buna and another run on 22 November by way of the Admiralty Islands. She also took part in one troop transport run to Wewak from Rabaul.

Kazagumo was ordered on troop evacuation runs to Guadalcanal 1 and 4 February 1943. She then took part in an evacuation run to the Russell Islands on 7 February. From 17–24 February, the ship escorted a troop convoy from Palau to Wewak. She was then ordered to escort a troop convoy from Palau to Hansa Bay on 6–12 March. The vessel took part in another troop transport run from the Shortlands to Kolombangara on 1 April. Then again to Buka 2–3 April, during which she was damaged by a mine in Kahili Bay on 3 April. Temporary repairs were done by the repair ship Hakkai Maru at Rabaul, 17–18 April. The ship sailed for Japan and was repaired there from 29 April–9 June.

Returning to active duty, Kazagumo took part in a troop evacuation run to Kiska on 29 July. The destroyer performed another troop evacuation run to Kolombangara on 28 September. She took part in the Battle of Vella Lavella, the last Japanese naval victory. Kazagumo engaged a trio of American destroyers, USS Selfridge, Chevalier, and O'Bannon, firing off several salvos of 5-inch (127 mm) guns, but during the initial action was unable to fire her torpedoes in fear of hitting her sister ship Yūgumo. Yūgumo was promptly sunk by gunfire and torpedoes from the three destroyers, but not before launching a torpedo spread that hit Chevalier, causing O'Bannon to collide with the wrecked destroyer. After the destroyer Samidare took Selfridge out of action with a torpedo that blew off her bow, Kazagumo regrouped with the destroyers Akigumo and Isokaze, and together they spotted the damaged Chevalier and O'Bannon and fired a torpedo spread at the pair. However, none of them hit. Kazagumo retreated to the Japanese troop convoy, which was untouched, and escorted them to safety. The damaged O'Bannon and Selfridge retreated from the battlefield and left the battered Chevalier to sink. After the battle, a banquet was held for the Japanese ships, during which one of Kazagumo's crew members, drunk after several rounds of sake, ranted about the war effort, how the Japanese battleships were sitting in port doing nothing while destroyers were forced to take up the brunt of the American warship, particularly raving about Yūgumo's sinking. At the time, she was thought to be lost with all hands (a third of her crew was rescued by American PT boats). The drunk sailor was promptly pulled away by his crewmates.

Kazagumo returned to transport duties, performing an aircrew transport run from Truk to Kavieng on 31 October-1 November and then a troop transport run to Bougainville on 6 November 1943. In December, she received a refit which updated her with mounted Type 13 and 22 radar sets. At the start of 1944 and the following months, she operated alongside the aircraft carriers Shōkaku and Zuikaku, escorting them on several operations, before doing the same with the battleship Fusō throughout May.

On 8 June 1944, Kazagumo was escorting the cruisers Myōkō and Haguro from Davao to support Biak troop transport operations. She was torpedoed and sunk by the submarine USS Hake at the mouth of Davao Gulf (06°03′N 125°57′E). The destroyer Asagumo rescued 133 survivors.
