= Japanese cruiser Ashigara =

Myōkō class heavy cruiser

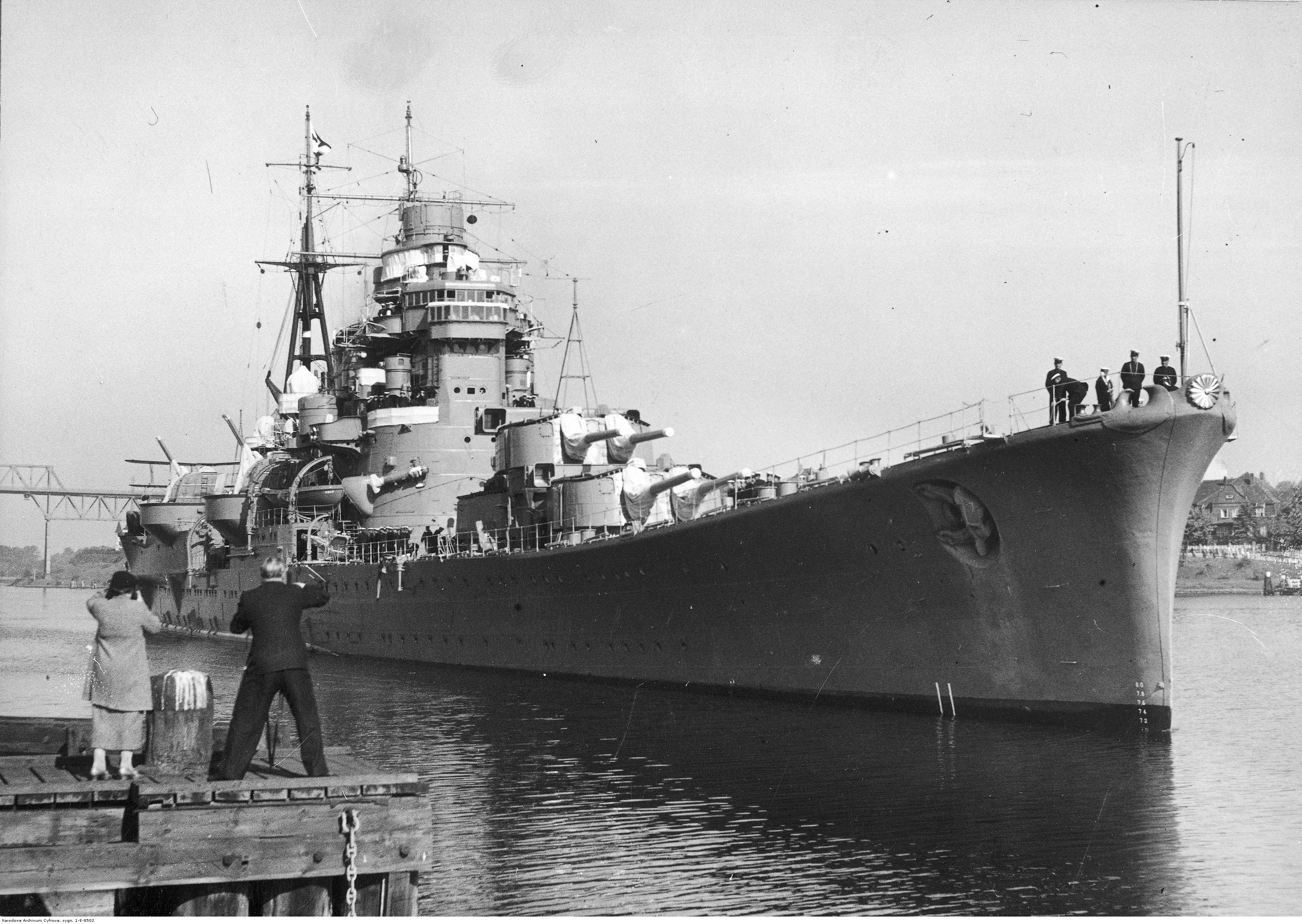
- Heavy cruiser Ashigara photographed visiting a port in Germany, 1937

History

Empire of Japan
- Name: Ashigara
- Namesake: Mount Ashigara
- Ordered: 1924
- Builder: Kawasaki Shipyards, Kobe, Japan
- Laid down: 11 April 1925
- Launched: 22 April 1928
- Commissioned: 20 August 1929
- Fate: Sunk in Bangka Strait, 8 June 1945

General characteristics
- Class & type: Myōkō-class cruiser
- Displacement: 13,000 long tons (13,209 t) (design); 14,743 long tons (14,980 t) (actual)
- Length: 203.76 m (668 ft 6 in)
- Beam: 19 m (62 ft 4 in) (as built); 20.73 m (68 ft 0 in) (final)
- Draft: 5.9 m (19 ft 4 in) (as built); 6.37 m (20 ft 11 in) (final)
- Propulsion: 4-shaft geared turbines; 12 Kampon boilers; 130,000 shp
- Speed: 35.5 knots (40.9 mph; 65.7 km/h)(as built); 33 knots (38 mph; 61 km/h) (final)
- Range: 7,000 nmi (13,000 km) at 14 kn (16 mph; 26 km/h)
- Complement: 920–970
- Armament: (as built); 10 × 200 mm (7.9 in) guns (5×2); 6 × Type 10 120 mm AA Guns; 2 × 7.7 mm (0.30 in) machine guns; 12 × 610 mm (24 in) torpedo tubes; (final); 10 × 203 mm (8.0 in) guns (5×2); 8 × 12.7 cm/40 Type 89 naval guns; 8 × Type 96 25mm AA guns; 2 × quadruple 13.2 mm (0.52 in) machine guns; 16 × 610 mm (24 in) torpedo tubes
- Aircraft carried: 3
- Aviation facilities: 2x aircraft catapults

Service record
- Part of: (Empire of Japan) Imperial Japanese Navy
- Operations: Pacific War; Battle of the Philippines (1941–42); Battle of the Java Sea (1942); Battle of Leyte Gulf (1944)

Ashigara (足柄) was the final vessel of the four-member Myōkō class of heavy cruisers of the Imperial Japanese Navy, which were active in World War II. The other ships of the class were Nachi, Myōkō, and Haguro. Ashigara was named after Mount Ashigara on the border of Kanagawa and Shizuoka Prefectures.

== Background ==
Ashigara was approved under the 1922 Fleet Modernization Program as one of the first heavy cruisers to be built by Japan within the design constraints imposed by the Washington Naval Treaty, and was one of the first of the "10,000 ton" cruisers built by any nation. Naval architect Vice admiral Yuzuru Hiraga was able to keep the design from becoming dangerously top-heavy in its early years by continually rejecting demands from the Imperial Japanese Navy General Staff for additional equipment to the upper decks. However, during modifications and rebuildings in the 1930s, the final displacement rose to 15,933 tons, well over the treaty limits.

== Design ==
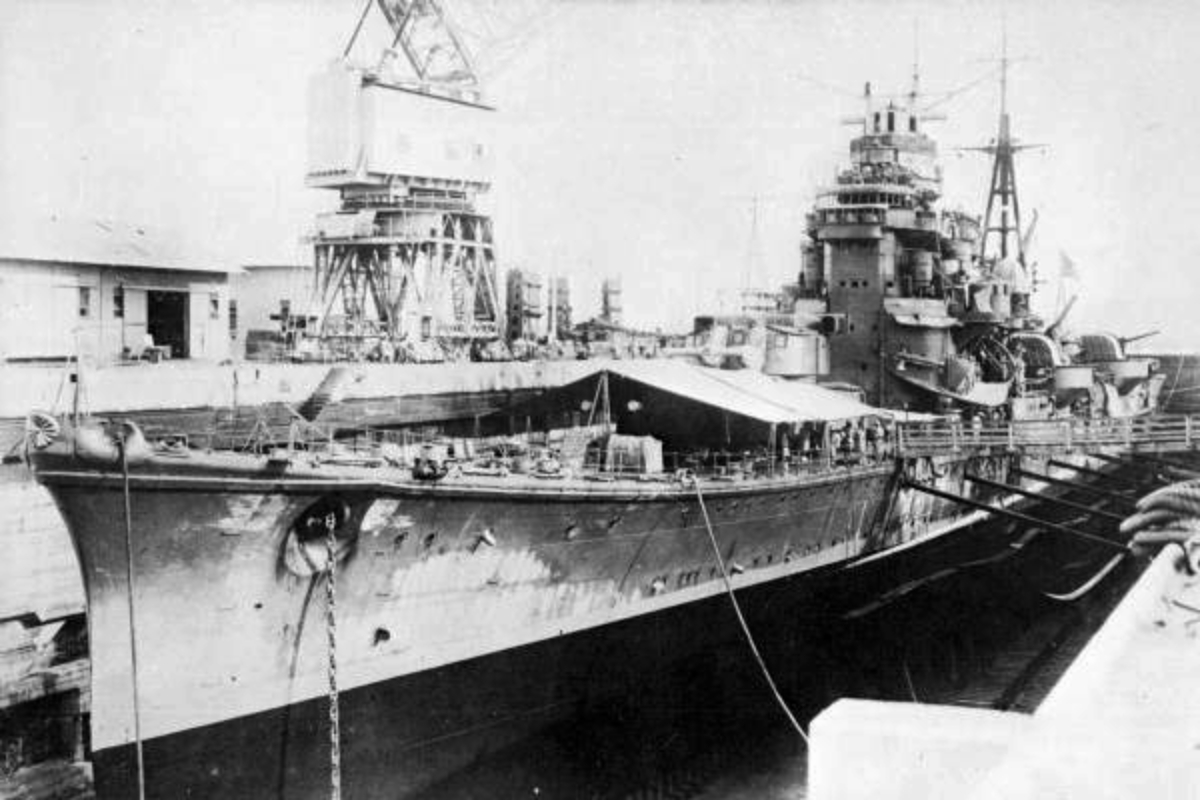
Ashigara in drydock at Singapore, December 1942

The Myōkō class displaced 13,500 t (13,300 long tons), with a hull design based on an enlarged version of the Aoba-class cruiser. Ashigara was 203.8 metres (669 ft) long, with a beam of 19.5 metres (64 ft), draft of 6.36 metres (20.9 ft) and were capable of 35.5 knots (65.7 km/h; 40.9 mph). Propulsion was by 12 Kampon boilers driving four sets of single-impulse geared turbine engines, with four shafts turning three-bladed propellers. The ship was armored with a 102 mm side belt, and 35 mm armored deck; however, the bridge was not armored.

Ashigara’s main battery was ten 20 cm/50 3rd Year Type naval guns, the heaviest armament of any heavy cruiser in the world at the time, mounted in five twin turrets. Her secondary armament included eight 12.7 cm/40 Type 89 naval guns in four twin mounts on each side, and 12 Type 93 Long Lance torpedoes in four triple launchers positioned below the aircraft deck. Ashigara was also equipped with an aircraft catapult and carried up to three floatplanes for scouting purposes.

Ashigara was laid down at the Kawasaki Shipyards in Kobe on 11 April 1925, launched and named on 22 April 1928, and was commissioned into the Imperial Japanese Navy on 20 August 1929.

Ashigara was repeatedly modernized and upgraded throughout her career in order to counter the growing threat of air strikes.

== Operational history ==
=== Early service ===
All of the Myōkō-class cruisers were assigned to the Sasebo Naval District, forming Sentai-4 of the IJN 3rd Fleet, and trained as a unit during the 1930s. Ashigara was flagship of the unit under Vice Admiral Nobutarō Iida from 30 November 1929. During a naval review off Kobe on 26 October 1930 stack gases caused problems on the bridge, resulting in a lengthening of the forward smokestack by two meters.

During the First Shanghai Incident of February 1932, the cruisers escorted the transports conveying elements of the Imperial Japanese Army to the continent. In December 1932, the cruisers were placed in reserve as the new Takao-class cruiser was commissioned, becoming the new Sentai-4, whereas the Myōkō class was shifted to Sentai-5. Between 1933 and 1935, all Myōkō-class cruisers were retrofitted with their fixed triple torpedo launchers replaced by two quadruple rotatable launchers, and their secondary guns upgraded from 12 cm/45 10th Year Type naval guns to 12.7 cm/40 Type 89 naval gun. During 1935 summer training off of Muroran, Hokkaido, a flashback during a gunnery exercise destroyed her No.2 turret, killing 41 crewmen. Repairs were completed by December.

On 10 March 1937, Ashigara was assigned detached duty for a diplomatic mission to Europe for the coronation of King George VI. She departed Yokosuka, Kanagawa on 3 April, and called on Singapore, Aden, the Suez Canal and Malta on her way to Portsmouth, arriving 10 May. Following the 20 May naval review, Ashigara called on Kiel, Germany and the majority of the crew was allowed to visit Berlin, where the senior staff was received by Adolf Hitler on 24 May. On 31 May, Ashigara participated in the German Kriegsmarine Day naval review, celebrating the German World War I "victory" at the Battle of Jutland. She then returned to Japan via Gibraltar, Port Said (Egypt), and Colombo (Ceylon).

During the Second Sino-Japanese War Ashigara was designated flagship of Sentai-5 on 5 July 1937. She led the convoy with the Imperial Japanese Army Expeditionary Army Headquarters to China on 21 August.

=== SS President Hoover ===
In the early hours of 11 December 1937 the ocean liner SS President Hoover en route from Kobe to Manila ran aground in a typhoon on Kasho-to off Taiwan, and 14 hours later Ashigara and a Mutsuki-class destroyer arrived to assist. The two warships stood by as Hoover's 330 crew got all 503 passengers and themselves ashore.

On 12 December the Clemson-class destroyers USS Alden and USS Barker arrived and Ashigara cleared them to enter Japanese territorial waters. On 13 December the liner SS President McKinley arrived to repatriate about 630 survivors, and on 14 December, Ashigara and her destroyer escort provided flat-bottomed boats to ferry them from the beach to a motor launch and lifeboats that took them out to the liner. On 15 December the liner SS President Pierce evacuated the last 200 survivors, and Alden was allowed to remain to guard Hoover's wreck until Japanese authorities relieved her on 23 December.

=== Pre-war ===
Captain Kuninori Marumo assumed command of Ashigara from 15 December 1937, followed by Captain Marquis Tadashige Daigo from 3 June until 1 December. Ashigara's second reconstruction was completed at Yokosuka Naval Arsenal on 15 February 1939. She was commanded by Captain Michiaki Kamada from December 1938 to October 1940. Ashigara participated in the occupation of Cochin China, arriving in Saigon on 29 July 1941. She returned to Sasebo in August and was appointed flagship for Vice Admiral Ibō Takahashi's Sentai-16 on 2 December.

=== Second World War ===
At the time of the attack on Pearl Harbor, Ashigara deployed out of Mako Guard District in the Pescadores with the cruisers Maya and Kuma to support Japanese forces in the invasion of northern Luzon. On 10 December, she was attacked by nine PBY Catalina bombers, which failed to score a hit. She was again unsuccessfully attacked by five United States Army Air Forces B-17 Flying Fortress bombers the following day. She continued to support Japanese landing operations in the Philippines, as well as Balikpapan and Makassar in the Dutch East Indies through February 1942. On 10 December Ashigara was in a holding position in the South China Sea about 200 miles (320 km) northwest of Manila Bay, with the heavy cruiser Maya, light cruiser Kuma, and destroyers Ikazuchi and Inazuma. Admiral Takahashi commanded the Philippine Invasion Force. His position was discovered by U. S. Navy air patrols from Luzon. PBY-4 #17 from VP 102, Patrol Wing Ten, flying an assigned sector, located the ships, and the contact report resulted in a strike. Five of the wing's PBY-4s, flying from NAS Sangley Point on Manila Bay, attacked at noon time, dropping twenty 500 lb demolition bombs in a tight pattern from 13,500 feet. The splashes were clustered about close astern of the cruiser and at the time it was thought at least two bombs hit their target, which turned in a tight circle and appeared to be maneuvering with difficulty. No one observed any fire or smoke from the target ship. Flak was heavy, but only one PBY sustained minor damage. The two heavy cruisers were identified as battleships, the target ship thought to be Kongo, but this was officially downgraded to cruisers in subsequent reports. Two follow-up strikes by PBY-4s in the following hours failed to find the ships.

During the aftermath of the Battle of the Java Sea on 1 March 1942, Ashigara joined the rest of her class in tracking down the severely damaged heavy cruiser HMS Exeter and her two destroyers. During the engagement, Ashigara combined fire with her sister ship Myōkō to sink the destroyer HMS Encounter, while her sister ships Haguro and Nachi finished off Exeter.

On 10 March 1942, she became flagship for the Second Southern Expeditionary Fleet, and led the invasion of Christmas Island on 26 May 1942. She became flagship of the Southwest Area Fleet from 10 April 1942, and returned to Sasebo Naval Arsenal for a refit and repairs in June. She returned to Makassar in July to resume her position as flagship of the Second Southern Expeditionary Fleet, but for the rest of the year was primarily engaged as a rapid troop transport based out of Surabaya. She was dry-docked and repaired at Seletar Naval Base in Singapore at the end of the year.

In 1943 and early 1944, Ashigara performed guard and troop transport duties and saw no action. She returned to Yokosuka for a month in April, and a Type 21 radar was installed. In February 1944, she was reassigned to the IJN 5th Fleet for operations in northern waters. A Type 22 surface-search radar was installed in March, and she was based out of the Ōminato Guard District, together with Nachi until the end of July. She was refitted at Kure Naval Arsenal in September, with additional Type 96 AA guns installed.

In the Battle of Leyte Gulf on 24 October 1944, Ashigara, with Captain Hayao Miura in command, was assigned to Vice Admiral Kiyohide Shima's, force along with Nachi and eight destroyers. This force entered Surigao Strait on 25 October after Admiral Shōji Nishimura's First Raiding Force had been destroyed. Following the loss of the battleships Fusō and Nishimura's Yamashiro and their escorts at the hands of Rear Admiral Jesse B. Oldendorf's fleet and aircraft, with Nishimura being killed aboard Yamashiro, Ashigara and Nachi fired their torpedoes and retreated (Nachi with damage from a collision with Mogami). Ashigara escaped to Palawan and from there to Brunei. She departed Brunei on 17 November with the battleship Haruna and cruiser Ōyodo, and on arriving in the Spratly Islands the following day became the flagship of Vice Admiral Shima. On 20 November, she departed the Spratly Islands, arriving at Cam Ranh Bay, Indochina on 14 December, where Admiral Shima transferred his flag to Hyūga. Ashigara and Ōyodo and the destroyers Kiyoshimo, Asashimo, Kasumi, Kaya, Kashi, and Sugi were assigned to join the Raiding Force on the American beachhead in Mindoro in the Philippines. While approaching Mindoro, the Raiding Force was attacked by B-25 Mitchell bombers. Ashigara was damaged by a direct hit by a 500 lb bomb, but was still able to complete her mission, bombarding the American positions with over 200 shells and returning to Cam Ranh Bay on 29 December.

==== Fate ====
On 26 January 1945, Ashigara was dry-docked in Singapore to repair bomb damage. On 5 February, she was transferred to the control of the 10th Area Fleet and spent the next five months transporting troops and supplies in the Dutch East Indies and the Bay of Bengal. On 22 April, she was attacked by the Royal Dutch Navy submarine HNLMS O 19, which fired four torpedoes, all of which missed.

On 7 June 1945, Ashigara departed Batavia for Singapore with 1,600 troops on board, escorted by the destroyer Kamikaze. The United States Navy submarine USS Blueback reported their departure but was unable to maneuver into an attack position. Blueback's contact report was received by the Royal Navy submarines HMS Trenchant and HMS Stygian, which lay in wait at the northern end of Bangka Strait, between Sumatra and Bangka Island. On the morning of 8 June 1945, Kamikaze and Trenchant spotted each other and exchanged fire, but both then lost contact with each other. While Kamikaze continued north and became entangled in combat with Stygian, Trenchant submerged, spotted Ashigara heading north at 1148, then made a difficult torpedo attack from a poor firing position abaft the cruiser's starboard beam, firing eight torpedoes from her bow tubes at 1212. Trapped between the Sumatran shore to port and a shoal to starboard, Ashigara nevertheless attempted to turn starboard to comb the torpedo tracks but was unable to complete the maneuver in time and was hit five times at a range of 4,700 yards (4,300 m). Trenchant then fired two more torpedoes from her stern tubes, which missed, but Ashigara was already fatally damaged and sank at 1239 at 01°59′S 104°56′E.

Kamikaze, having also lost contact with Stygian, turned back south too late to intercept Trenchant, which made her escape submerged. Kamikaze and two local vessels rescued 400 Japanese Army troops and 853 crewmen, including her captain, Rear Admiral Miura; however, over 1200 troops and 100 crewmen went down with the ship. Ashigara was struck from the IJN Navy List on 20 August 1945.

== See also ==
- List by death toll of ships sunk by submarines
