= Japanese destroyer Kasumi (1937) =

Asashio-class destroyer

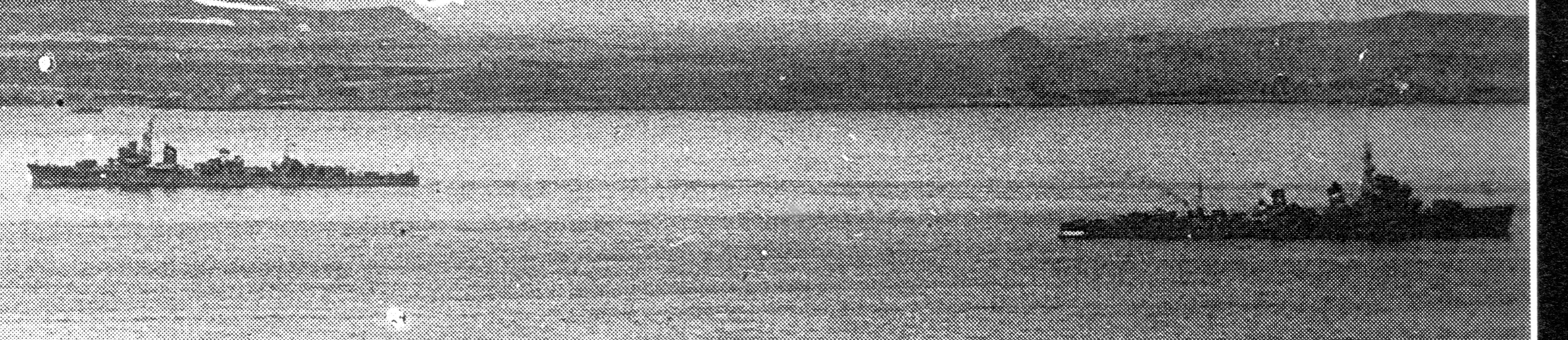
- Kasumi (left) and Wakaba anchored in the Paramushir strait, June 1944

History

Empire of Japan
- Name: Kasumi
- Ordered: 1934 Maru-2 Program
- Builder: Uraga Dock Company
- Laid down: 1 December 1936
- Launched: 18 November 1937
- Commissioned: 28 June 1939
- Stricken: 10 May 1945
- Fate: Sunk, 7 April 1945

General characteristics
- Class & type: Asashio-class destroyer
- Displacement: 2,370 long tons (2,408 t)
- Length: 111 m (364 ft) pp; 115 m (377 ft 4 in) waterline; 118.3 m (388 ft 1 in) OA
- Beam: 10.3 m (33 ft 10 in)
- Draft: 3.7 m (12 ft 2 in)
- Installed power: 51,000 shp (38,031 kW)
- Propulsion: 2-shaft geared turbine, 3 boilers
- Speed: 34.85 knots (40.10 mph; 64.54 km/h)
- Range: 5,700 nmi (10,600 km) at 10 kn (19 km/h); 960 nmi (1,780 km) at 34 kn (63 km/h)
- Complement: 230
- Armament: 6 × 12.7 cm/50 Type 3 DP guns; up to 28 × Type 96 AA guns; up to 4 × Type 93 AA guns; 8 × 24 in (610 mm) torpedo tubes; 36 depth charges

Kasumi (霞; "Haze") was the ninth of ten Asashio-class destroyers built for the Imperial Japanese Navy in the mid-1930s under the Circle Two Supplementary Naval Expansion Program (Maru Ni Keikaku).

== History ==
Kasumi was the ninth of ten Asashio-class destroyers built for the Imperial Japanese Navy.

The Asashio-class destroyers were larger and more capable that the preceding Shiratsuyu-class, as Japanese naval architects were no longer constrained by the provisions of the London Naval Treaty. These light cruiser-sized vessels were designed to take advantage of Japan's lead in torpedo technology, and to accompany the Japanese main striking force and in both day and night attacks against the United States Navy as it advanced across the Pacific Ocean, according to Japanese naval strategic projections. Despite being one of the most powerful classes of destroyers in the world at the time of their completion, none survived the Pacific War.

Kasumi, built at the Uraga Dock Company, was laid down on 1 December 1936, launched on 18 November 1937 and commissioned on 28 June 1939. On completion, she was assigned to the IJN 2nd Fleet as part of destroyer division 18 (Shiranui, Kagerō, Kasumi, Arare), Destroyer squadron 2 under command of Commander Kiyoshi Tomura.

== Operational history ==
At the time of the attack on Pearl Harbor, Kasumi was based at Etorofu in the Kurile Islands, and sailed as part of the escort for Admiral Nagumo's Carrier Strike Force, guarding the fleet tankers accompanying the strike force. She returned to Kure on 24 December.

In January 1942, Kasumi escorted aircraft carriers Shōkaku and Zuikaku to Truk, and onwards to Rabaul to cover landings of Japanese forces at Rabaul and Kavieng and air strikes on Lae and Salamaua. In February she sortied from Palau to cover the air strike on Darwin, and was based from Staring-baai in Sulawesi, Netherlands East Indies from 21 February. At the end of the month, she was making patrols south of Java, and on March 1-2, Kasumi was escorting the aircraft carriers in the Indian Ocean when a Japanese floatplane located the 8,806-ton Dutch freighter Modjokerto, which prompted a flotilla of Japanese destroyers to engage the enemy ship. Gunfire from Kasumi, Shiranui, Kagerō, Isokaze, Ariake, and Yūgure smothered Modjokerto in 5-inch (127 mm) shells and sank the freighter in 3 minutes.

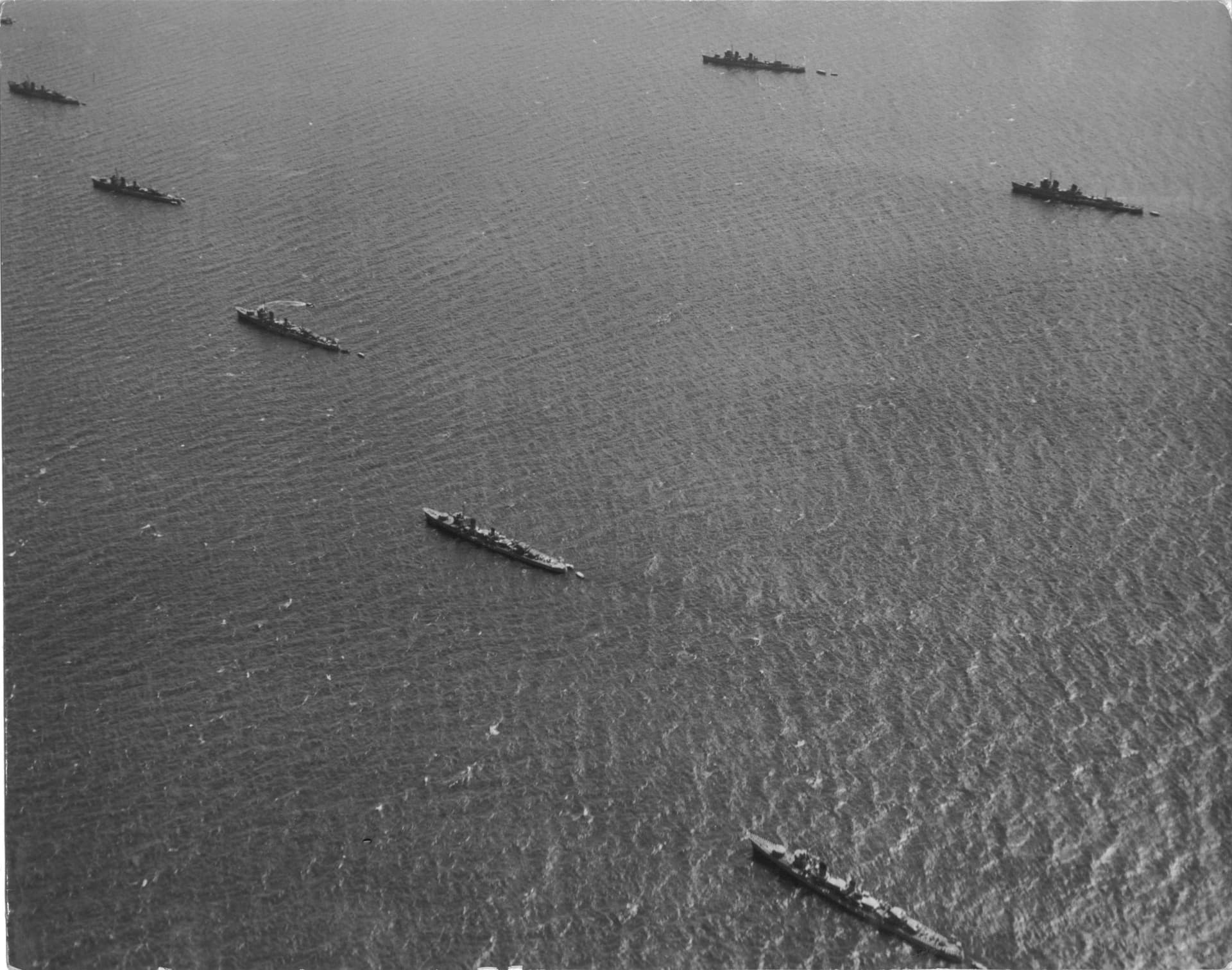
Kasumi (middle ship, left column) anchored off Yokohama during a fleet review, 11 October 1940

Kasumi departed Staring-baai on 27 March to escort the carrier force in the Indian Ocean raid on 27 March After the Japanese air strikes on Colombo and Trincomalee in Ceylon, she returned to Kure for repairs on 23 April. Kasumi deployed from Saipan on 3 June as part of the escort for the troop convoy in the Battle of Midway. Afterwards, she escorted the cruisers Kumano and Suzuya from Truk back to Kure. On 28 June, she was assigned to escort the aircraft carrier Chiyoda to Kiska in the Aleutian Islands on a supply mission. While approximately 7 nautical miles (13 km; 8.1 mi) east of Kiska at 52°0′N 177°40′E on 5 July, she was hit amidships by a torpedo fired by the submarine USS Growler, which severed her bow, killing 10 crewmen. She remained under repairs in Japan until 30 June 1943.

On 1 September 1943, as part of Desdiv 9, Desron 1 of the IJN 5th Fleet, Kasumi was reassigned to northern waters, making patrols from her base at Paramushiro and Shumushu until the end of November. In December, she made a transport run to convey replacement aircrews from Yokosuka to Kwajalein and Wotje, returning with the cruiser Mogami to Maizuru. While at Maizuru for refit though 18 January 1944, her X-turret was removed and replaced by additional two triple Type 96 25mm AA guns.

Kasumi was returned to patrols of the northern approaches to Japan in February, escorting a troop convoy to Uruppu in late March and returning with the cruisers Nachi and Ashigara to Kure at the start of August.

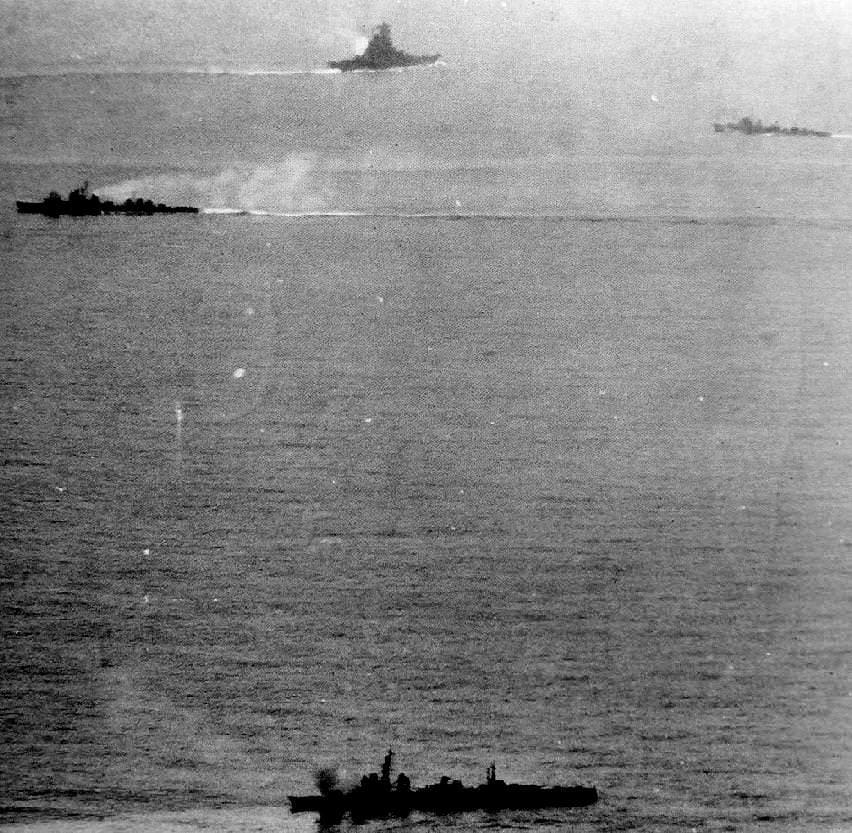
Kasumi under attack during Operation Ten Go, down by the bow after taking a bomb hit

During the Battle of Leyte Gulf from 24 to 25 October, she was assigned to Admiral Shima's force in the Battle of Surigao Strait. On 5 November, she rescued survivors of Nachi in Manila Bay following an American air raid. She escorted a troop convoy to Ormoc on 5 November, and was damaged by strafing in another American air raid later that month, which killed one crewman. At the end of November, she escorted the battleship Haruna from Singapore to Mako, and a convoy from Mako to Cam Ranh Bay in French Indochina in December. In late December, she led a force in the bombardment of San Jose in the Philippines.

In February 1945, Kasumi escorted the battleships Ise and Hyūga from Singapore to Kure. She was reassigned to the IJN 2nd Fleet on 10 March.

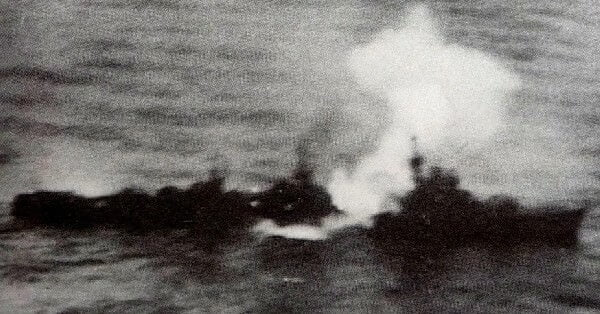
Kasumi on fire

On 6 April 1945, Kasumi was part of the escort for the final mission of the battleship Yamato. Coming under attack by nearly 400 carrier-based aircraft from Task Force 58 on 7 April. Kasumi for the first hour fought her away through the attack, but by 13:30 was fatally damaged by two bomb hits and several near misses, which left her dead in the water and on fire, and suffering 17 dead and 47 injured. The destroyer Fuyutsuki removed survivors and scuttled her with two torpedoes, 150 miles (240 km) southwest of Nagasaki at position (31°N 128°E). She was removed from the navy list on 10 May 1945.

== See also ==
- Operation Kita
- List of ships of the Imperial Japanese Navy
