= Toshio Abe =

Japanese naval officer (1896–1944)

- 阿部 俊雄
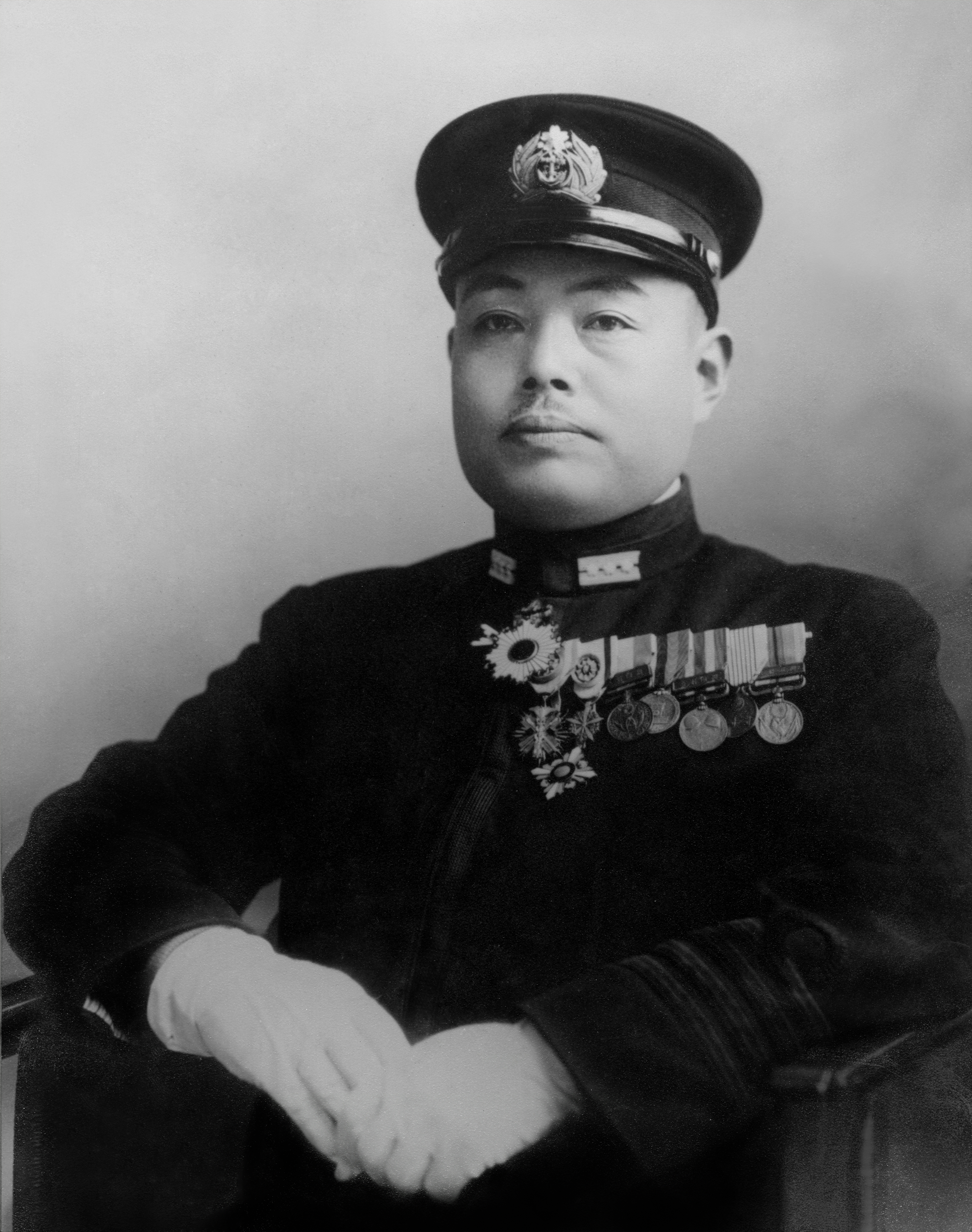
- Born: 27 April 1896; Ehime, Japan
- Died: 29 November 1944 (aged 48); Off Cape Shiono, Wakayama, Japan
- Education: Imperial Japanese Naval Academy; Torpedo School
- Relatives: Hiroaki Abe (brother)
- Military career
- Allegiance: Empire of Japan
- Branch: Imperial Japanese Navy
- Service years: 1918–1944
- Rank: Rear admiral (posthumous)
- Units: Torpedo School; 1st Carrier Striking Force; Combined Fleet
- Commands: Fumizuki, Fushimi, Sumida, Asagiri, Destroyer Division 21, Destroyer Division 8, Destroyer Division 10, Ōyodo, Shinano
- Conflicts: World War II; Pacific War; Battle of Badung Strait; Battle of Midway; Battle of the Eastern Solomons; Battle of the Santa Cruz Islands

Toshio Abe (阿部 俊雄, Abe Toshio; 27 April 1896 – 29 November 1944) was an officer of the Imperial Japanese Navy who led destroyer divisions in the Pacific War and was the only captain of the aircraft carrier Shinano. A torpedo specialist, he commanded Destroyer Division 8 at the Battle of Badung Strait in February 1942 and Destroyer Division 10 at the Battle of Midway in June 1942, where his destroyers took off the crew of the burning carrier Hiryū and scuttled her. He went down with Shinano when the American submarine USS Archerfish sank her on her maiden voyage on 29 November 1944, and he was posthumously promoted to rear admiral.

== Biography ==
=== Early life ===
Abe was born on 27 April 1896 in Ehime Prefecture. He was the younger brother of the naval officer Hiroaki Abe. He graduated from the 46th class of the Imperial Japanese Naval Academy in 1918.

Abe specialised in torpedo warfare, and he completed the advanced course at the navy's Torpedo School, where he later served as an instructor. He commanded the destroyer Fumizuki from 1931, the river gunboats Fushimi and Sumida in 1933 and 1934, and the destroyer Asagiri from 1937. He became commander of Destroyer Division 21 in 1939 and was promoted to captain in November 1940.

=== Pacific War ===
In September 1941, Abe became commander of Destroyer Division 8. On the night of 19–20 February 1942, the division's four destroyers, Asashio, Ōshio, Arashio, and Michishio, were escorting the transports of the invasion force off Bali when an Allied squadron under the Dutch rear admiral Karel Doorman attacked them. In the Battle of Badung Strait that followed, the Japanese destroyers sank the Dutch destroyer HNLMS Piet Hein and damaged the American destroyer USS Stewart and the Dutch cruiser HNLMS Tromp, while Michishio was badly damaged. The Allied force withdrew, and Japan captured Bali and its airfield. The chief of staff of the Combined Fleet, Matome Ugaki, praised the action in his diary as a "truly splendid night battle" by a single destroyer division.

In March 1942, Abe took command of Destroyer Division 10, which formed part of the screen of the 1st Carrier Striking Force at the Battle of Midway in June 1942. After the aircraft carrier Hiryū was set on fire by American dive bombers, Abe brought his destroyer alongside to help fight the fires, according to American writer Don Keith. Early on 6 June, Hiryū was abandoned, and the destroyers Makigumo and Kazagumo took off her crew. Rear Admiral Tamon Yamaguchi and Captain Tomeo Kaku chose to remain aboard. Makigumo was ordered to scuttle the carrier, and Keith wrote that Abe gave the order to fire the torpedoes. Makigumo fired two torpedoes at Hiryū, and the carrier sank later that morning.

Under Abe, the division escorted the carrier striking force at the Battle of the Eastern Solomons in August 1942, and the Vanguard Force of his brother, Vice Admiral Hiroaki Abe, at the Battle of the Santa Cruz Islands in October 1942. In February 1943, he became head of studies at the Torpedo School, while also serving on the navy's technical council and as head of its research department.

In May 1944, Abe became captain of the light cruiser Ōyodo, which was then the flagship of the Combined Fleet under Admiral Soemu Toyoda.

=== Shinano ===
Shinano had been laid down as the third Yamato-class battleship, and she was converted into an aircraft carrier after the Japanese losses at Midway. On 15 August 1944, Abe was appointed her chief equipping officer, and on 1 October he was formally designated her commanding officer. After the defeat in the Battle of the Philippine Sea, the Imperial Japanese Navy General Staff brought her completion date forward to 15 October 1944, and many tests, including air-tightness tests of her watertight compartments, were omitted. According to the author Hideo Andō, Abe argued daily with the ship's chief designer, Captain Tatsuo Maeda, over unfinished work.

Only eight of the carrier's twelve boilers were working, and Abe wanted more time to complete her flooding tests. Many of her crew were untrained replacements. At the handover ceremony at the Yokosuka Naval Arsenal on 19 November 1944, Abe's hands reportedly shook with anger as he received the certificate of delivery. On 27 November, his request to postpone the voyage in order to complete more work and training was rejected.

Shinano was ordered to sail from Yokosuka to Kure to complete her fitting out. At a conference on the eve of departure, the captains of the three escorting destroyers of Destroyer Division 17 urged a daytime passage along the coast, where they believed that submarines could be spotted more easily. Abe chose instead to sail at night on a route through the open ocean, because the carrier had no aircraft of her own and no air cover could be expected. He also instructed the escorts not to open gaps in the screen by chasing submarines.

Shinano left Yokosuka at 13:30 on 28 November 1944, escorted by the destroyers Hamakaze, Yukikaze and Isokaze, with Abe in tactical command. That evening, she was detected by the American submarine USS Archerfish, commanded by Joseph F. Enright. When a submarine was sighted at 22:45, Abe forbade the escorts to open fire for fear of revealing the carrier's position, as he believed that it was a decoy for a wolfpack. He ordered the ships to zigzag in an attempt to outrun the submarine, but by midnight the carrier had to slow down because a propeller shaft bearing was overheating. At 03:09 on 29 November, four torpedoes from Archerfish hit Shinano on her starboard side.

According to a 1953 article in Proceedings, Abe at first showed little anxiety over the damage and kept the ship at 18 knots, reducing speed only when it was too late. He later ordered the men of the boiler and machinery departments to flood the outboard boiler rooms on the port side in an attempt to correct the list. After the carrier lost power, Hamakaze and Isokaze tried to tow her, but the tow cables parted. Abe gave the order to abandon ship at 10:18, according to Combined Fleet, while Toyoda gave the time as 10:37. Shinano capsized and sank at 10:57, with the loss of 1,435 officers and men.

Abe chose to go down with the ship. Accounts of his last moments differ, as the 1953 Proceedings article stated that he retired to his cabin, while Toyoda wrote that he remained near the chrysanthemum crest at the bow with a junior navigation officer. He was posthumously promoted to rear admiral.

=== Inquiry ===
In December 1944, the navy convened an inquiry into the loss, known as the "S Incident" investigation committee, under Vice Admiral Gunichi Mikawa. According to Toyoda, the committee concentrated on the choice of the night route through the open ocean and on why the ship had sunk after only four torpedo hits, and surviving officers felt that they were being blamed for failures by the Navy General Staff and the shipyard. The committee's report was destroyed at the end of the war. The former staff officer Masataka Chihaya recalled that the report pointed to defective watertight compartments and omitted tests, the choice of route and escort, and the crew's lack of training, without assigning clear responsibility.

== Personal life ==
Former subordinates described Abe as having the bearing of an old-style samurai. According to his wife, Kiyo, he burned his naval papers in the garden the day before Shinano sailed.

On 19 July 1990, his son Toshihiko Abe met Enright at his home in Carmel Valley, California, while researching his book Japan's Hidden Face. Toshihiko wrote that Enright offered his condolences to Abe's widow and explained the engagement with charts, and that the two men parted with the hope that such a war would never happen again.

== Honours ==
On 10 September 1919, Abe was granted the court rank of Senior Eighth Rank.
