= Asashio-class destroyer =

Japanese ship class

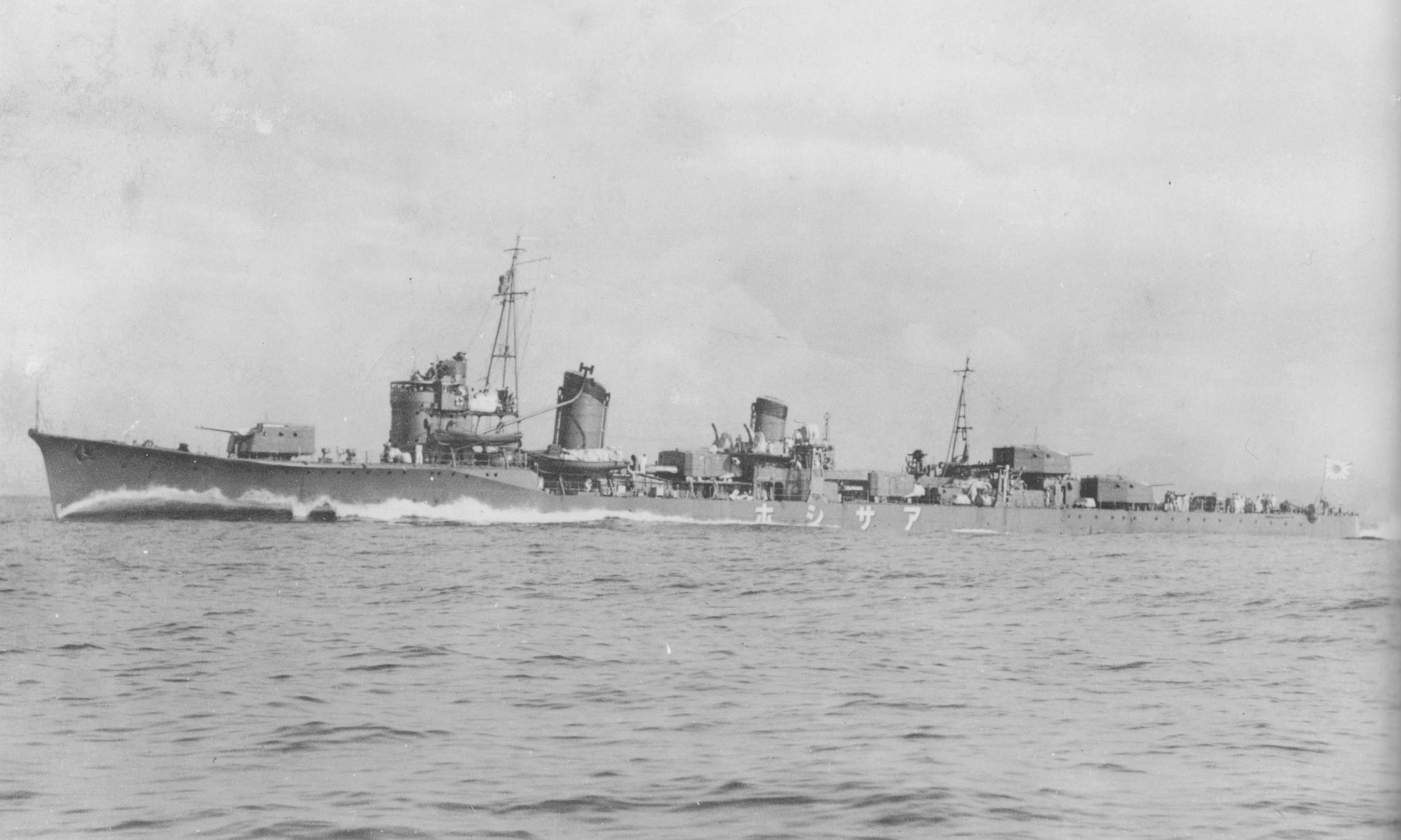
- Asashio underway in July 1937.

Class overview
- Name: Asashio class
- Builders: Fujinagata Shipyards (3); Sasebo Naval Arsenal (2); Maizuru Naval Arsenal (2); Kawasaki Dockyard Co. (2); Uraga Dock Company (1)
- Operators: Imperial Japanese Navy
- Preceded by: Shiratsuyu class
- Succeeded by: Kagerō class
- Built: 1937–1939
- In commission: 1939–1945
- Completed: 10
- Lost: 10

General characteristics
- Type: Destroyer
- Displacement: 2,370 long tons (2,408 t)
- Length: 111 m (364 ft) pp; 115 m (377 ft 4 in)waterline; 118.3 m (388 ft 1 in) OA
- Beam: 10.3 m (33 ft 10 in)
- Draft: 3.7 m (12 ft 2 in)
- Propulsion: 2-shaft geared turbine, 3 boilers, 50,000 shp (37,285 kW)
- Speed: 35 knots (40 mph; 65 km/h)
- Range: 5,700 nmi (10,600 km) at 15 kn (28 km/h); 960 nmi (1,780 km) at 34 kn (63 km/h)
- Complement: 200
- Armament: 6 × Type 3 127 mm 50 caliber naval guns (3 × 2); up to 28 × Type 96 AA guns; up to 4 × Type 93 AA guns; 8 × 610 mm (24 in) torpedo tubes (2 × 4); 16 × Type 93 torpedoes; 36 × depth charges

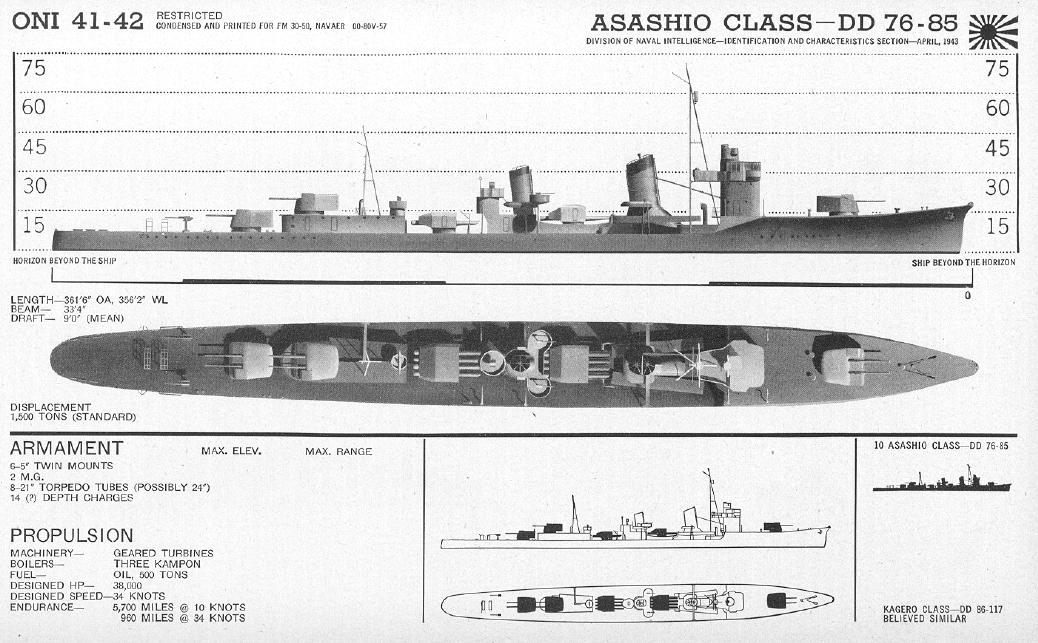
ONI image of an Asashio-class destroyer

The Asashio-class destroyers (朝潮型駆逐艦, Asashio-gata kuchikukan) were a class of ten destroyers of the Imperial Japanese Navy in service before and during World War II. The overall layout of the class proved successful in service and created a powerful ship that served as the basis for the design of the following two classes of destroyers.

== Background ==
The Imperial Japanese Navy was not entirely satisfied with the performance of the Shiratsuyu-class destroyer, particularly in terms of operational range and speed. However, given the limitations of the 1930 London Naval Treaty, it was considered impossible to modify these vessels any further to improve their specifications. This obstacle was removed after the Japanese government decided to allow the treaty to expire without renewal. The final four vessels of a projected 14 destroyers in the Shiratsuyu class were cancelled, and the larger new Asashio-class vessels were approved under the Maru-2 Supplementary Naval Expansion Budget of 1934, with construction spanning 1937–1939 as the treaty did not officially expire until December 31, 1936. All ten vessels were lost in the Pacific War.

== Design ==
The Asashio-class was the first Japanese destroyer class to exceed 2,000 tons displacement and the first to be equipped with sonar. The hull was 30 feet longer than the Shiratsuyu-class and displacement was increased by 300 tons.

The Asashio-class was powered by two steam turbine engines with two shafts, powered by three boilers, which operated at higher temperatures than the Shiratsuyu-class. The rated output of these engines was 50,000 hp (37,000 kW), which gave the class a top speed of 35 knots (65 km/h) and a range of 5,700 nautical miles (10,600 km) at 15 knots (28 km/h) or 960 nautical miles (1,780 km) at 34 knots (63 km/h). The Asashio-class was thus one knot faster than the Shiratsuyu-class despite the larger size and displacement of the vessels. However, during sea trials, early critical issues were discovered, especially with the reliability of the new steam turbines. Another issue was with design of the rudder, which initially led to problems with the ship's turning radius. These issues were addressed by the start of the Pacific War with a modified stern and rudder.

=== Armament ===
In terms of armament, the Asashio class reverted to the previous Fubuki main battery layout of 3 twin mount 12.7 cm/50 Type 3 naval guns, instead of the 5-gun design of the more recent Shiratsuyu and Hatsuharu classes that were constructed under treaty limitations. There was one twin turret forward of the bridge and a superfiring pair of twin turrets aft. The guns were capable of 55-degree elevation. Also, the position of the "X" turret at the shelter deck level forward of the quarterdeck "Y" turret, gave the Asashio class a different silhouette than the Shiratsuyu class, where both turrets were at quarterdeck level.

The torpedo armament of eight Type 93 torpedoes in two quadruple launchers as on the Shiratsuyu-class was retained, with eight reloads stored in a deckhouse on the centerline of the ship. At the start of the war, the Asashio-class was also equipped with 36 depth charges, while previous classes carried 18. Later in the war, the number of depth charges was increased to 36, and to compensate for the weight, one set of four torpedo reloads was removed.

In terms of anti-aircraft capability, initially two twin-mount Type 96 AA guns were placed forward of the second smokestack. The Asashio-class was the first destroyers to receive this type of gun. As the war progressed, the number of Type 96 guns was gradually increased. In 1942–1943, the twin-mounts were replaced by triple-mounts, and another twin-mount was added forward of the bridge. From 1943 to 1944, on surviving vessels the superfiring "X" turret was removed and replaced by two more triple-mounts. After 1944, surviving vessels were fitted with between eight and twelve additional single-mounts, and Kasumi received also two Type 93 13mm machine guns. In late 1944, the final four survivors (Kasumi, Michishio, Asagumo, and Yamagumo) received a Type 22 and a Type 13 radar.

== List of ships ==
Ships of the Asashio class
Kanji	Ship	Shipyard	Laid down	Launched	Completed	Fate
朝潮	Asashio	Sasebo Naval Arsenal	7 September 1935	16 December 1936	31 August 1937	Air strike in the Battle of the Bismarck Sea, 4 March 1943 at 07°15′S 148°15′E
大潮	Ōshio	Maizuru Naval Arsenal	5 August 1936	19 April 1937	31 October 1937	Torpedoed by USS Albacore, 20 February 1943 (Solomon Islands campaign) at 00°50′S 146°06′E
満潮	Michishio	Fujinagata Shipyards	5 November 1935	15 March 1937	31 October 1937	Surface action in the Battle of Surigao Strait, 25 October 1944 at 10°25′N 125°23′E
荒潮	Arashio	Kawasaki-Kobe	1 October 1935	26 May 1937	30 December 1937	Air attack in the Battle of the Bismarck Sea, 4 March 1943 at 07°15′S 148°30′E
朝雲	Asagumo	Kawasaki-Kobe	23 December 1936	5 November 1937	31 March 1938	Surface action in the Battle of Surigao Strait, 25 October 1944 at 10°04′N 125°21′E
山雲	Yamagumo	Fujinagata Shipyards	4 November 1936	24 July 1937	15 January 1938	Torpedoed and sunk by USS McDermut, Battle of Surigao Strait, 25 October 1944 at 10°25′N 125°23′E
夏雲	Natsugumo	Sasebo Naval Arsenal	1 July 1936	26 May 1937	10 February 1938	Air attack in the Battle of Cape Esperance, 12 October 1942 at 08°40′S 159°20′E
峯雲	Minegumo	Fujinagata Shipyards	22 March 1937	4 November 1937	30 April 1938	Surface action in the Battle of Blackett Strait, 5 March 1943 at 08°01′S 157°14′E
霰	Arare	Maizuru Naval Arsenal	5 March 1937	16 November 1937	15 April 1939	Torpedoed by USS Growler, 5 July 1942 (Aleutian Islands campaign) at 52°0′N 177°40′E
霞	Kasumi	Uraga Dock Company	1 December 1936	18 November 1937	24 June 1939	Sunk by carrier aircraft during Operation Ten-Go, 7 April 1945 at 31°N 128°E

== Operational history ==
Ten ships were built. Arare and Kasumi escorted the Kido Butai as they attacked Pearl Harbor, 7 December 1941. They remained with the carriers for the following months while the rest of the class took part in convoy and carrier escorting duties to assist in the invasion of the Philippines and Dutch East Indies. It was in the latter campaign that the class saw something of a highlight, starting on 19 February 1942 at the battle of the Badung Strait where Asashio, Ōshio, Michishio, and Arashio chased off a larger allied cruiser task-force from attacking a troop convoy. During the action, Asashio torpedoed and sank the Dutch destroyer Piet Hein - making her the first ship to sink an enemy vessel with the type 93 torpedo - before winning a gunfight with the light cruiser Tromp; hitting her with eleven 5-inch (127 mm) shells which set her on fire and forced her to retire from the battle with heavy damage. Asashio and Ōshio then combined fire to damage the destroyer USS Stewart so badly she could not be repaired before the fall of the Dutch East Indies, leading to her being scuttled in Surabaya. In exchange, Michishio was crippled by shell hits from US destroyers that left her dead in the water and under tow, Ōshio took a 5.9-inch (15 cm) shell from Tromp which miraculously did not set off the magazines and sink her in a fiery explosion, while Asashio took a 3-inch (76 mm) shell from Tromp that took out a searchlight.

On 27 February, Asagumo and Minegumo contributed to the battle of the Java Sea by fending off a trio of British destroyers, with Asagumo particularly getting the better of a gunnery duel with the destroyer HMS Electra, crippling her with gunfire before being joined by Minegumo in finishing her off. Asagumo took 4.7-inch (12 cm) shell hits in turn that forced her to temporarily halt for repairs. After the fall of the Dutch East Indies the class was involved on various raids on former ABDA fleet ships escaping to Australia, where Kasumi helped to sink the 8,806-ton Dutch freighter Modjokerto while Arashio sank the Dutch minesweeper Jan Van Amstel.

However, the class's glory days came to an end by the battle of Midway, 4 June, when both Asashio and Arashio were damaged by bomb hits, then a month later the class suffered its first loss as the submarine USS Growler launched a torpedo spread that sank Arare and snapped Kasumi in two. Kasumi survived this encounter and spent over a year being reconstructed. It was then on to the Guadalcanal and Solomon Islands campaign, which saw much of the same service but mixed with heavy troop and supply transport missions, plus escorting aircraft carriers at the battles of the Eastern Solomons and Santa Cruz. In October Natsugumo escorted seaplane tenders without seeing action in the battle of Cape Esperance, but in the battle's aftermath she was sunk by land-based aircraft, before the class rounded out 1942 with Asagumo's role in both naval battles of Guadalcanal. During the first battle, Asagumo led the Shiratsuyu class destroyers Murasame and Samidare, and together they charged the light cruiser USS Helena and prevented her from sinking the destroyer Amatsukaze, before they blasted the destroyer USS Monssen at point blank range, sinking her with some 39 hits. In the second battle, Asagumo fired torpedoes at the battleship USS South Dakota but inflicted no damage before rescuing survivors from the battleship Kirishima, which was sunk by the battleship USS Washington.

With the start of 1943, the class would suffer more losses. On 20 February, Ōshio was torpedoed and sunk by the submarine USS Albacore, while from 2-3 March Asashio and Arashio were both sunk by US and Australian air force bombers at the battle of the Bismarck Sea. The next day, Minegumo assisted in sinking the submarine USS Grampus, but later that night was caught at the battle of Blackett Strait and torpedoed and sunk by the destroyer USS Waller. The remaining four ships of the class saw a large break afterwards for the next year, made up of uneventful transport missions and patrol duty without seeing combat. The only exception came on 19 November 1943 when Yamagumo sank the submarine USS Sculpin with mixed depth charge and surface gunfire attacks.

On June 19–20, 1944, Michishio and Yamagumo escorted aircraft carriers at the battle of the Philippine Sea. In October, the remaining four ships of the class departed to take part in the battle of Leyte Gulf, the largest naval battle in history. On the early morning of the 25th, the class were caught in the battle of the Surigao Strait. Yamagumo was torpedoed and sunk by the destroyer USS McDermut, while Michishio was crippled and Asagumo was badly damaged by torpedoes from the destroyer HMAS Arunta. Michishio was finished off by the destroyer USS Hutchins, while Asagumo was finished off by the heavy cruiser USS Portland, the light cruisers USS Denver and USS Columbia, and several destroyers. Kasumi survived for several more months, but met her end on 7 April 1945 escorting the battleship Yamato during Operation Ten-Go. En route, the force was met by 386 carrier aircraft, and Kasumi was attacked by dive bombers from USS Bataan and USS Belleau Wood and destroyed by two bomb hits. The destroyer Fuyutsuki removed Kasumi's crew before scuttling the ship, bringing an end to the Asashio class.

== Gallery ==
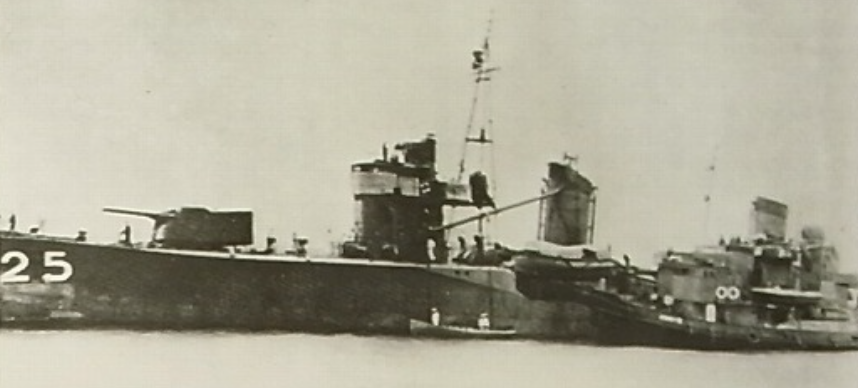
Asashio

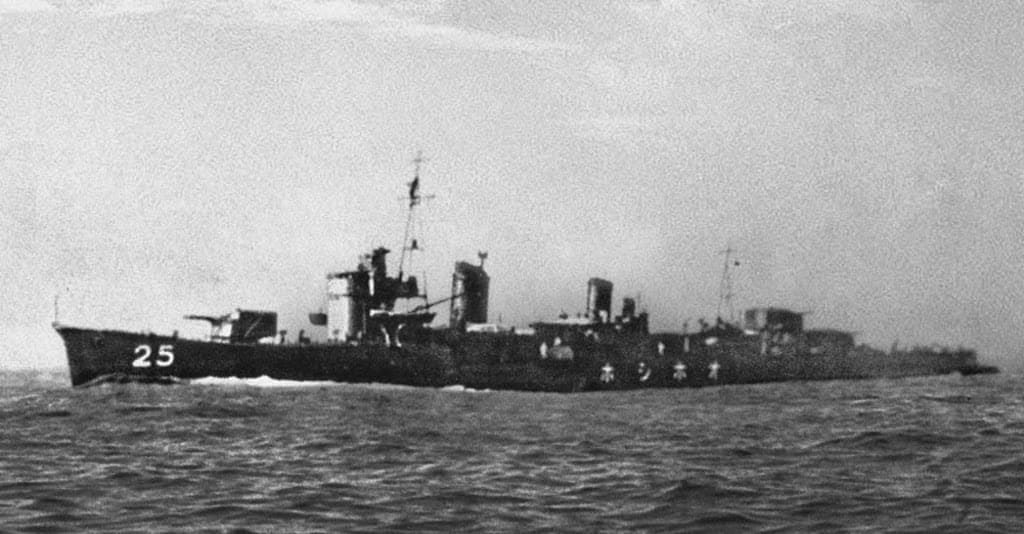
Ōshio

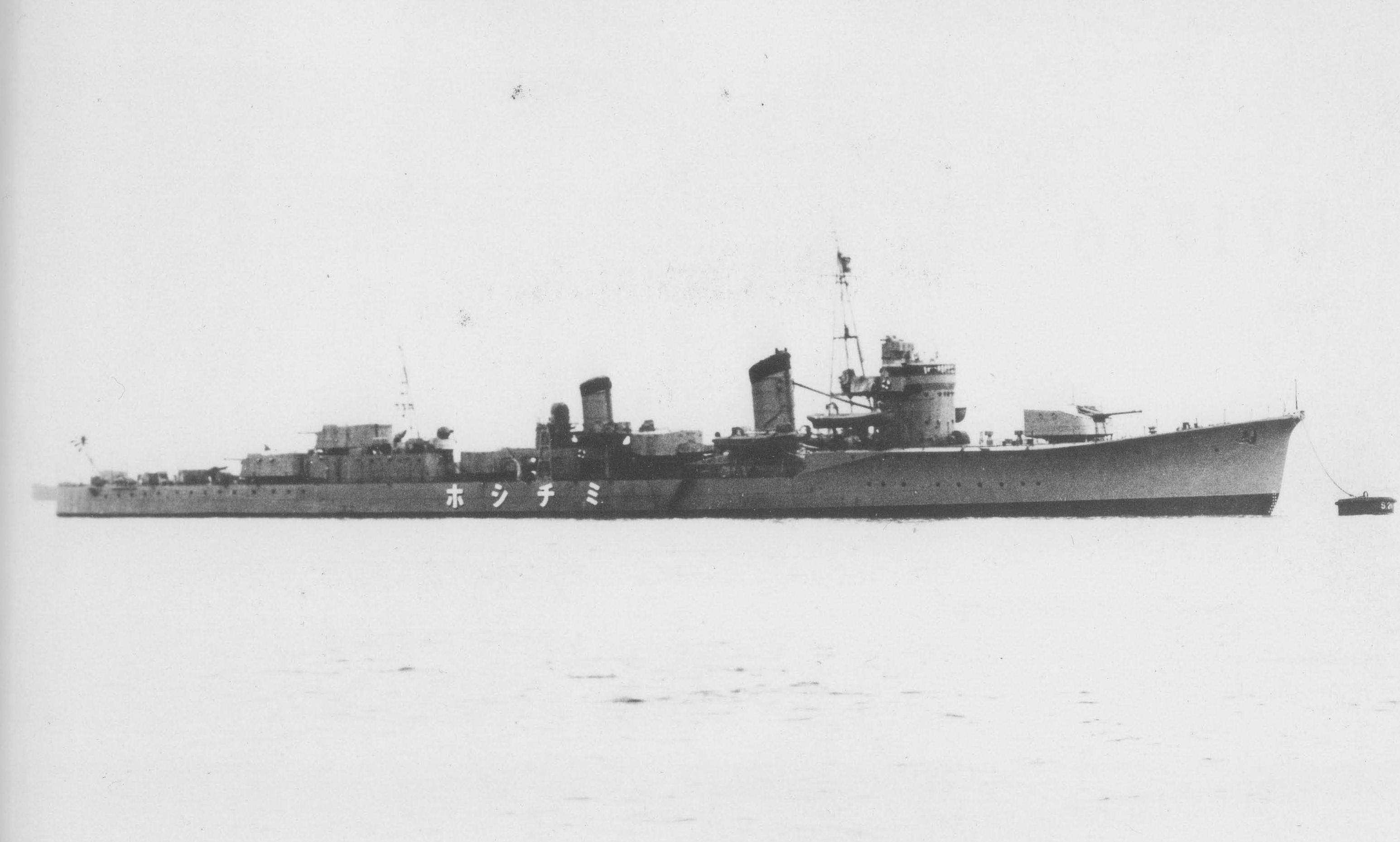
Michishio

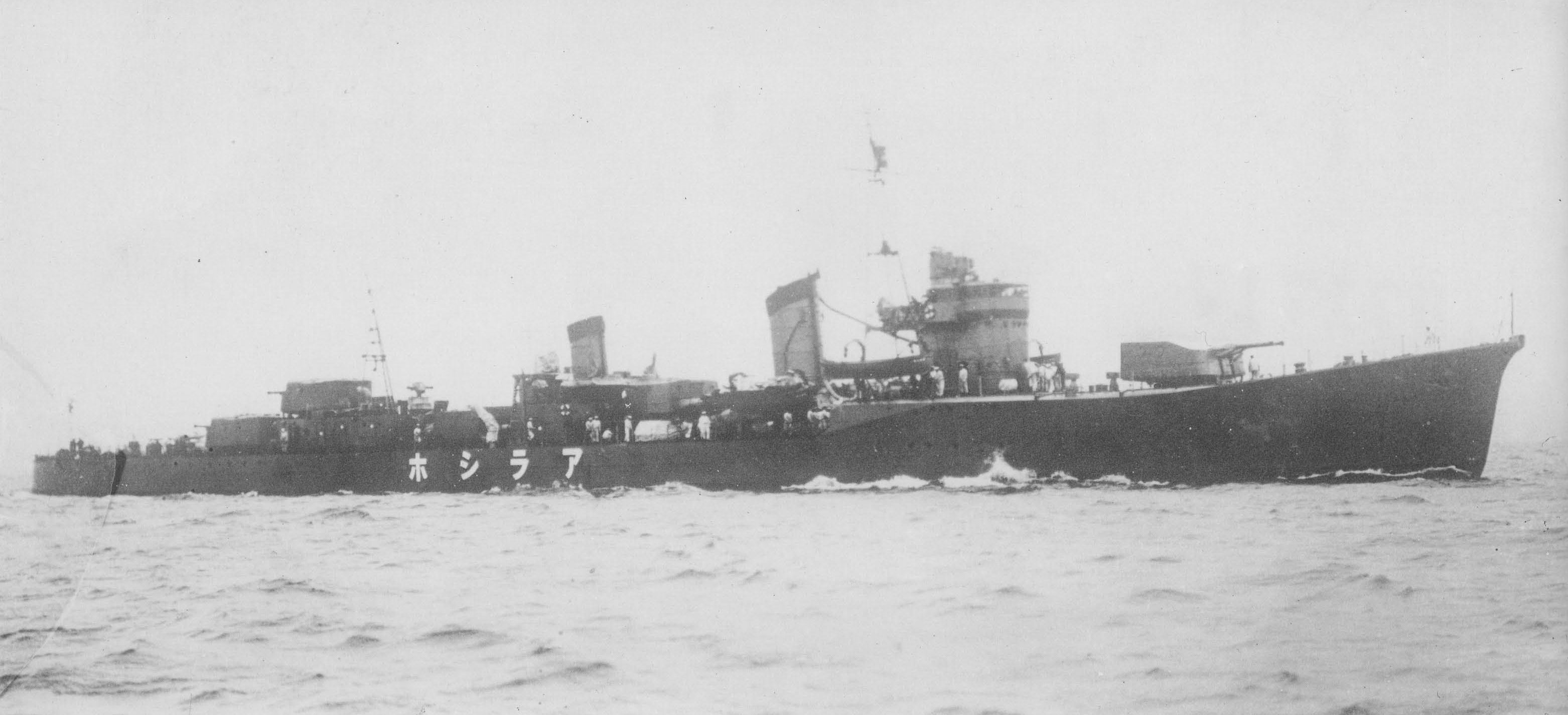
Arashio

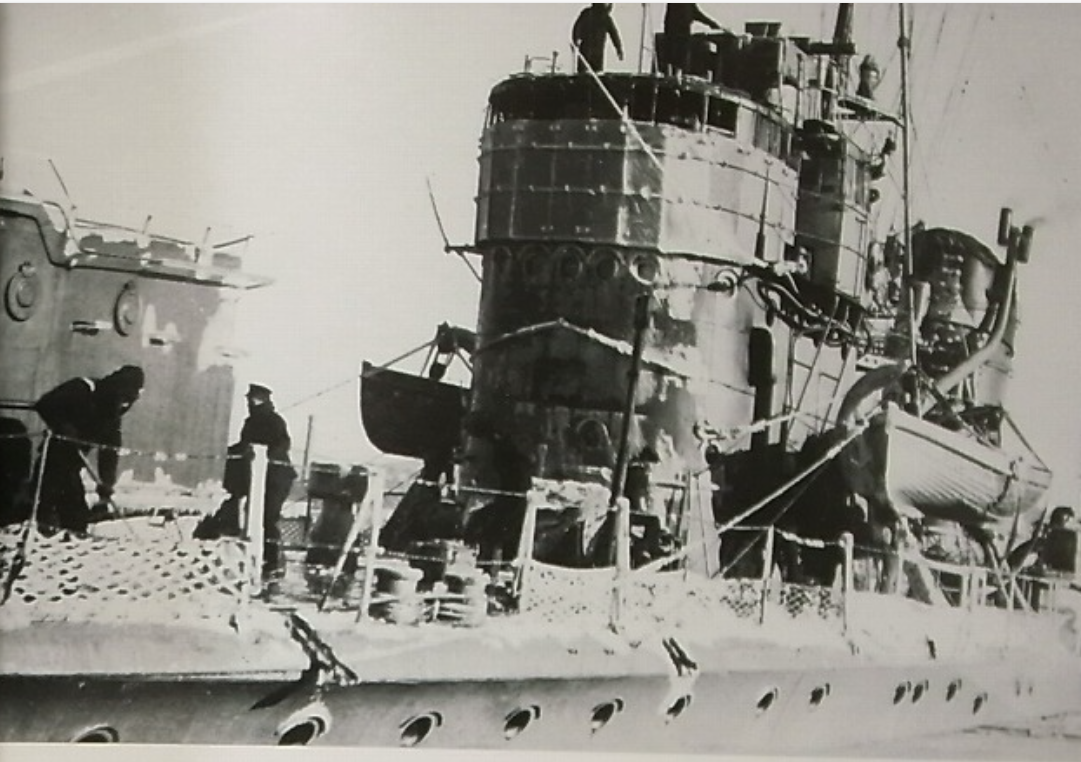
Arashio

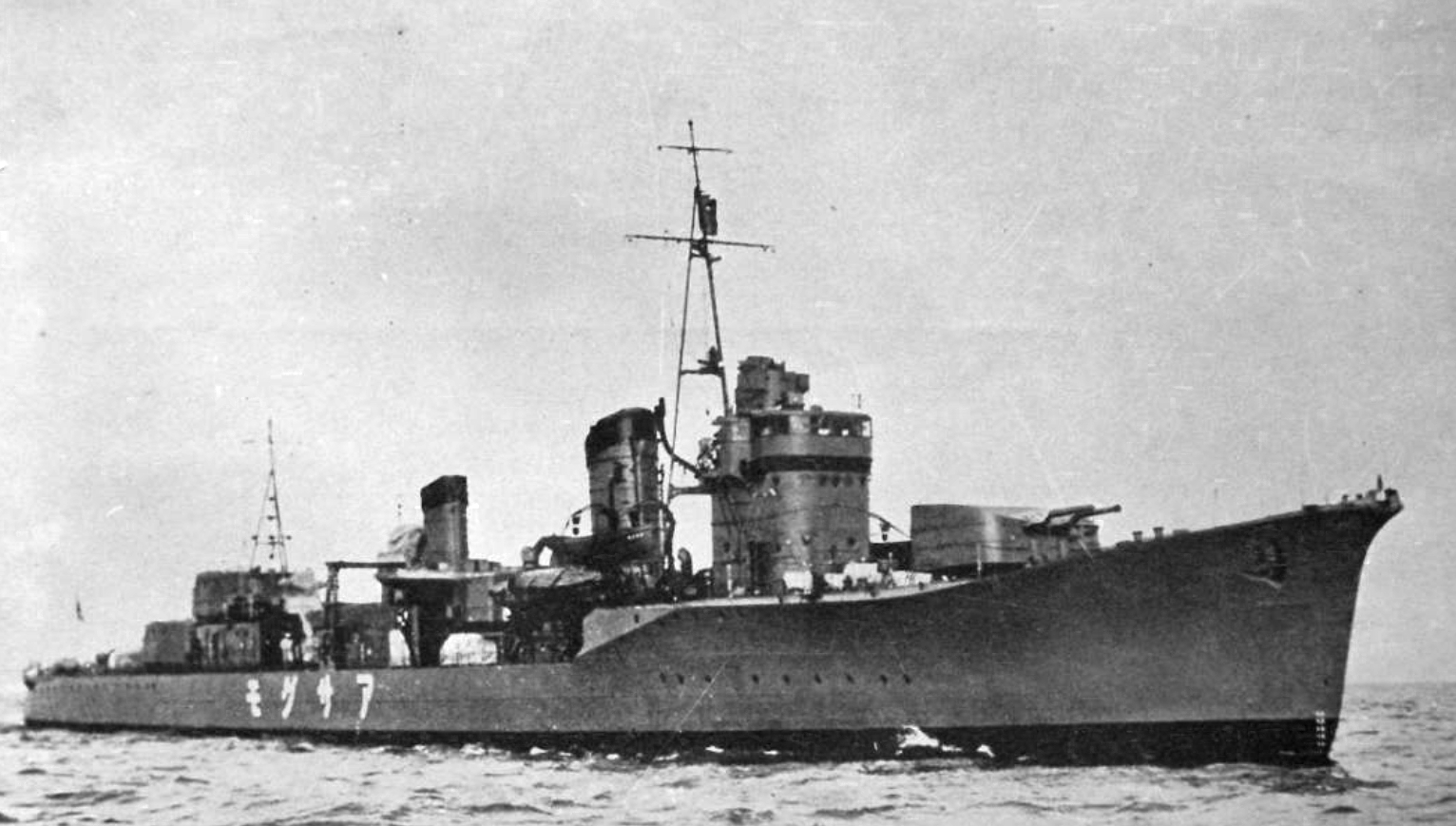
Asagumo

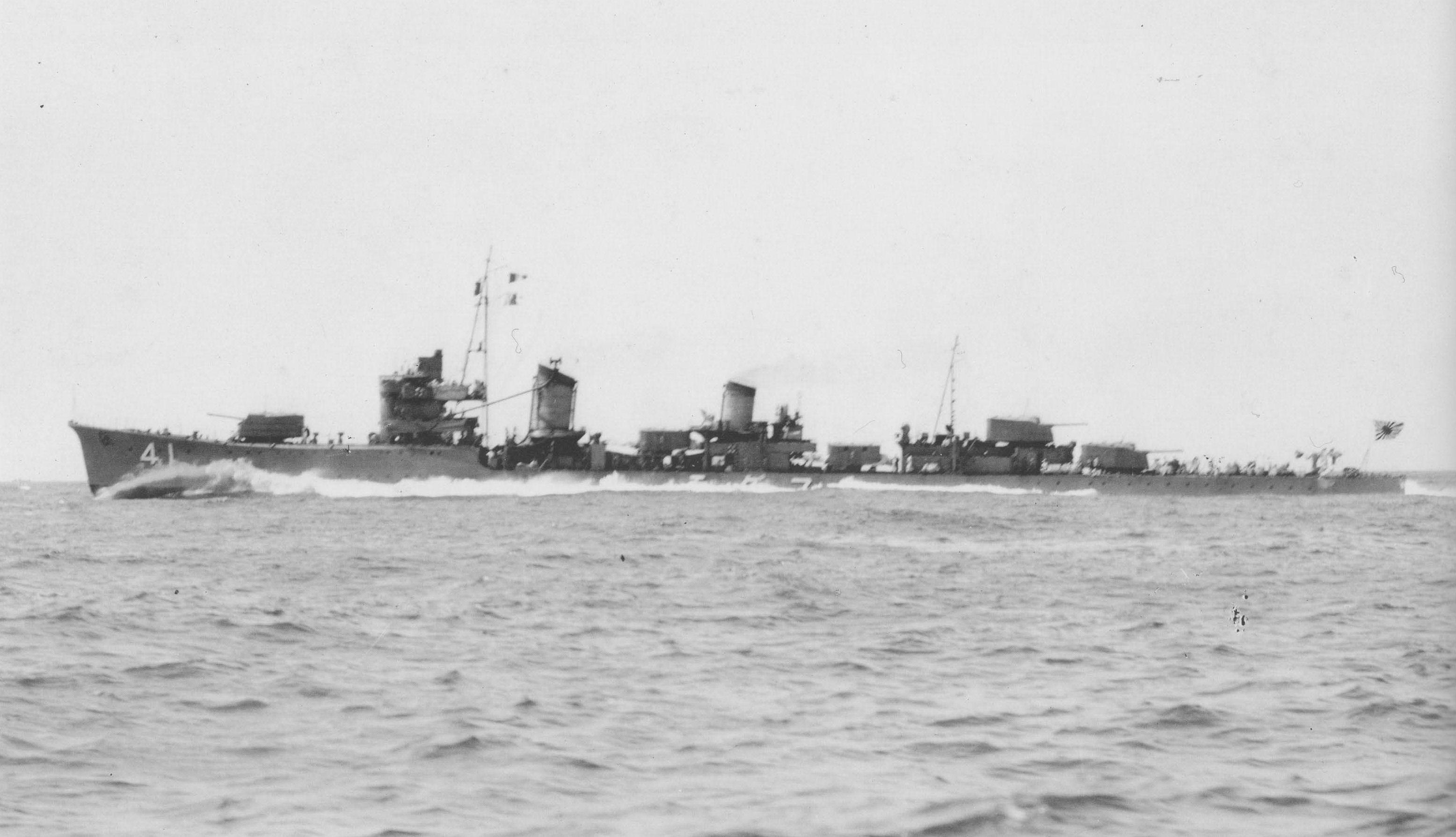
Yamagumo

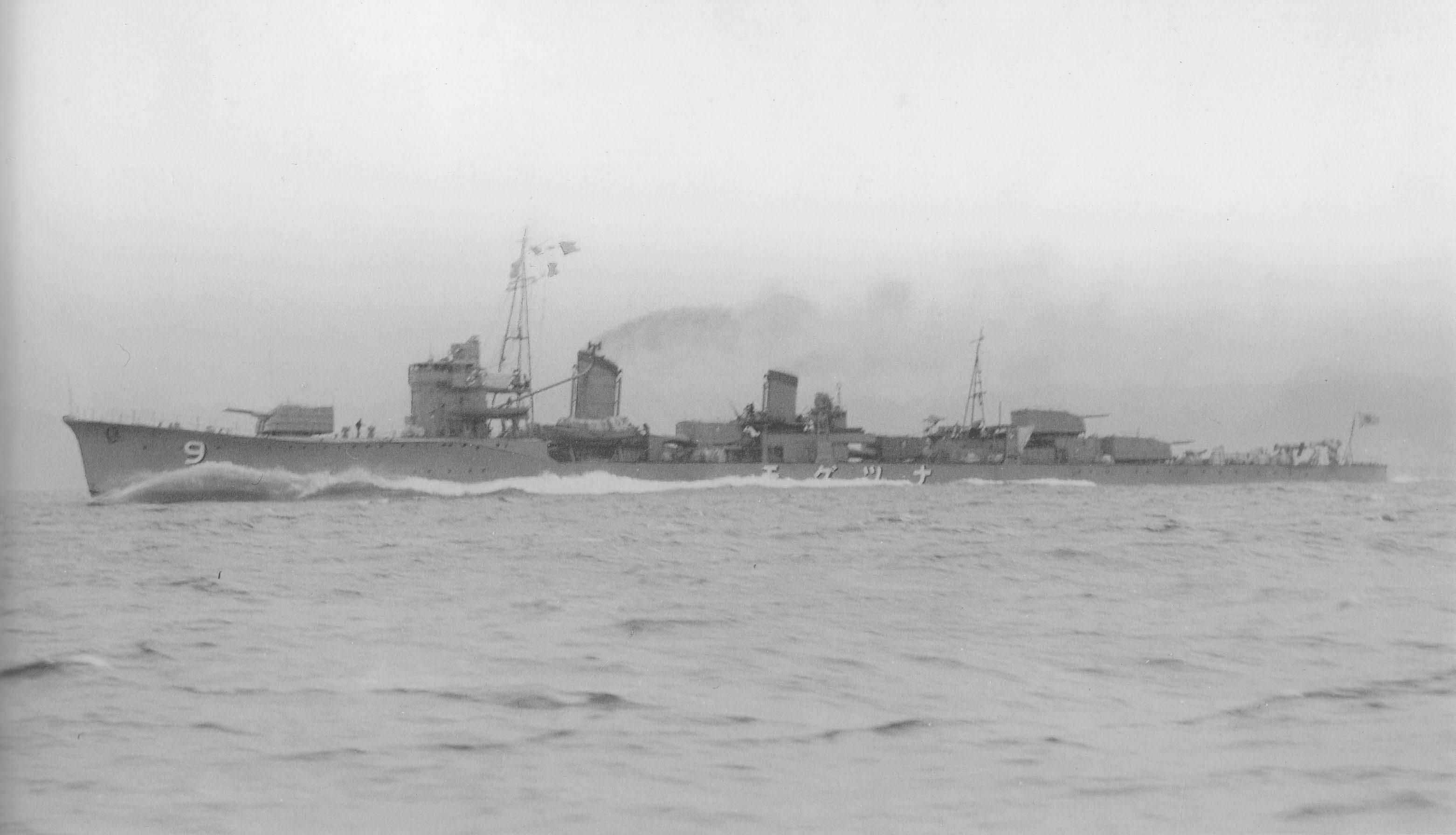
Natsugumo

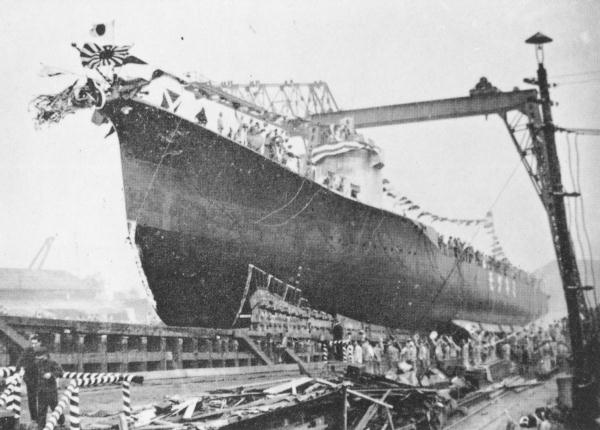
Minegumo

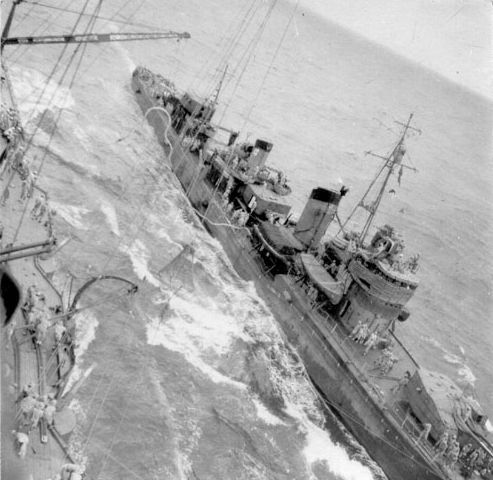
Arare

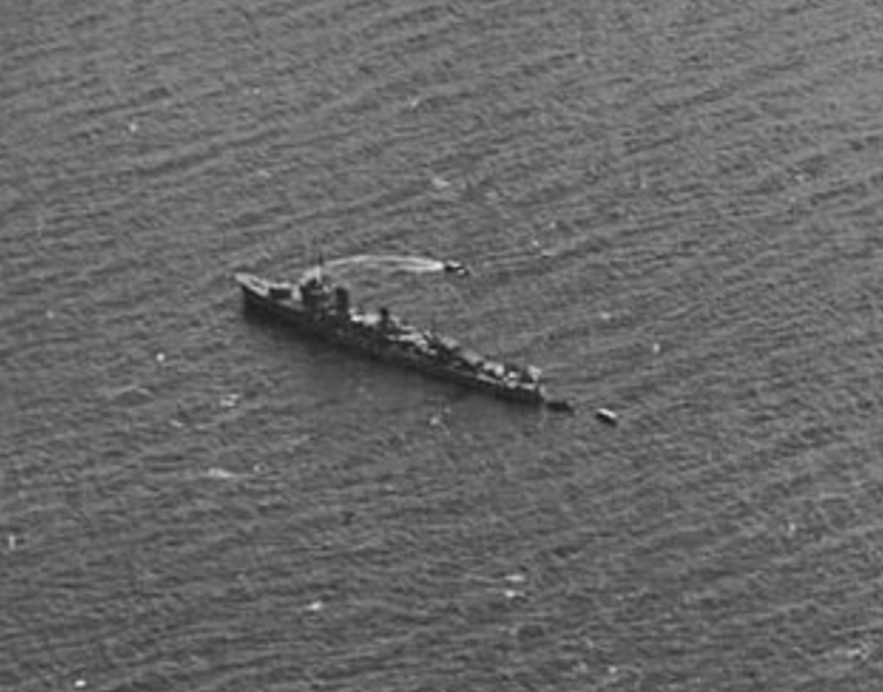
Kasumi

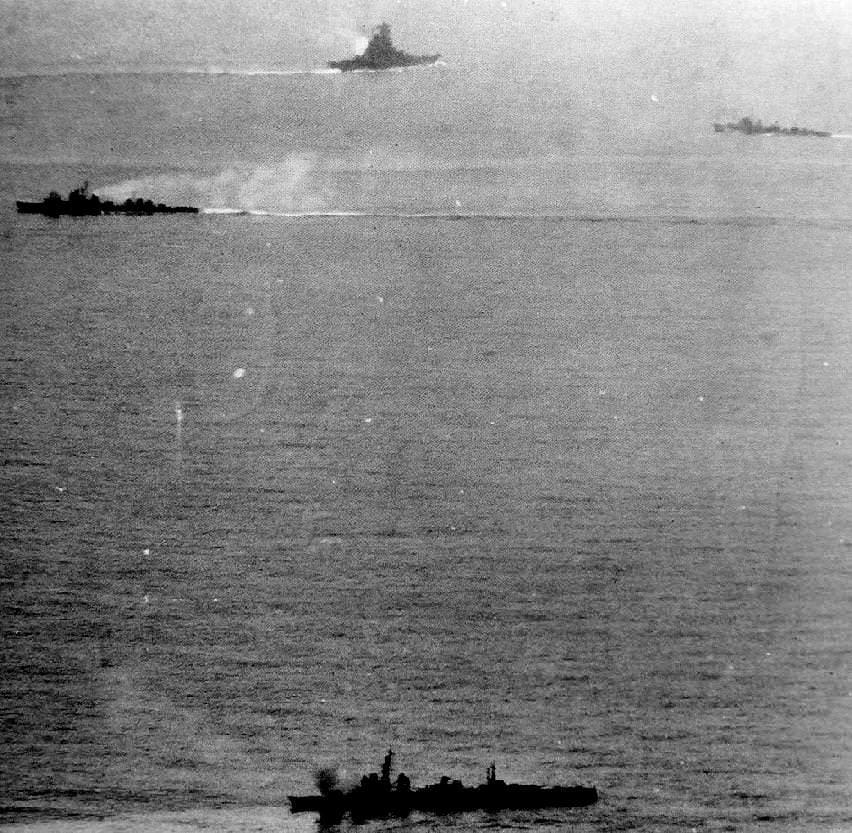
Kasumi (bottom center)

== See also ==
- List of ship classes of the Second World War

=== Books ===
- Evans, David (1979). Kaigun: Strategy, Tactics, and Technology in the Imperial Japanese Navy, 1887-1941. US Naval Institute Press. ISBN 0-87021-192-7.
- Brown, David (1990). Warship Losses of World War Two. Naval Institute Press. ISBN 1-55750-914-X.
- Roger Chesneau, ed. (1980). Conway's All the World's Fighting Ships 1922-1946. Grenwitch: Conway Maritime Press. ISBN 0-85177-146-7.
- Howarth, Stephen (1983). The Fighting Ships of the Rising Sun: The Drama of the Imperial Japanese Navy, 1895–1945. Atheneum. ISBN 0-689-11402-8.
- Jentsura, Hansgeorg (1976). Warships of the Imperial Japanese Navy, 1869–1945. US Naval Institute Press. ISBN 0-87021-893-X.
- Watts, A.J. (1966). Japanese warships of World War II. Ian Allan. ISBN 0-7110-0215-0.
- Whitley, M. J. (1988). Destroyers of World War 2. Cassell Publishing. ISBN 1-85409-521-8.
- Hara, Capt. Tameichi (1961). Japanese Destroyer Captain. New York: Ballantine Books. ISBN 0-345-02522-9.
- Morison, Samuel Eliot (1958). "Chapter 8". The Struggle for Guadalcanal, August 1942 – February 1943, vol. 5 of History of United States Naval Operations in World War II. Boston: Little, Brown and Company. ISBN 0-316-58305-7.
