= Japanese cruiser Suzuya (1934) =

Third ship in the Mogami class of Japanese heavy cruisers

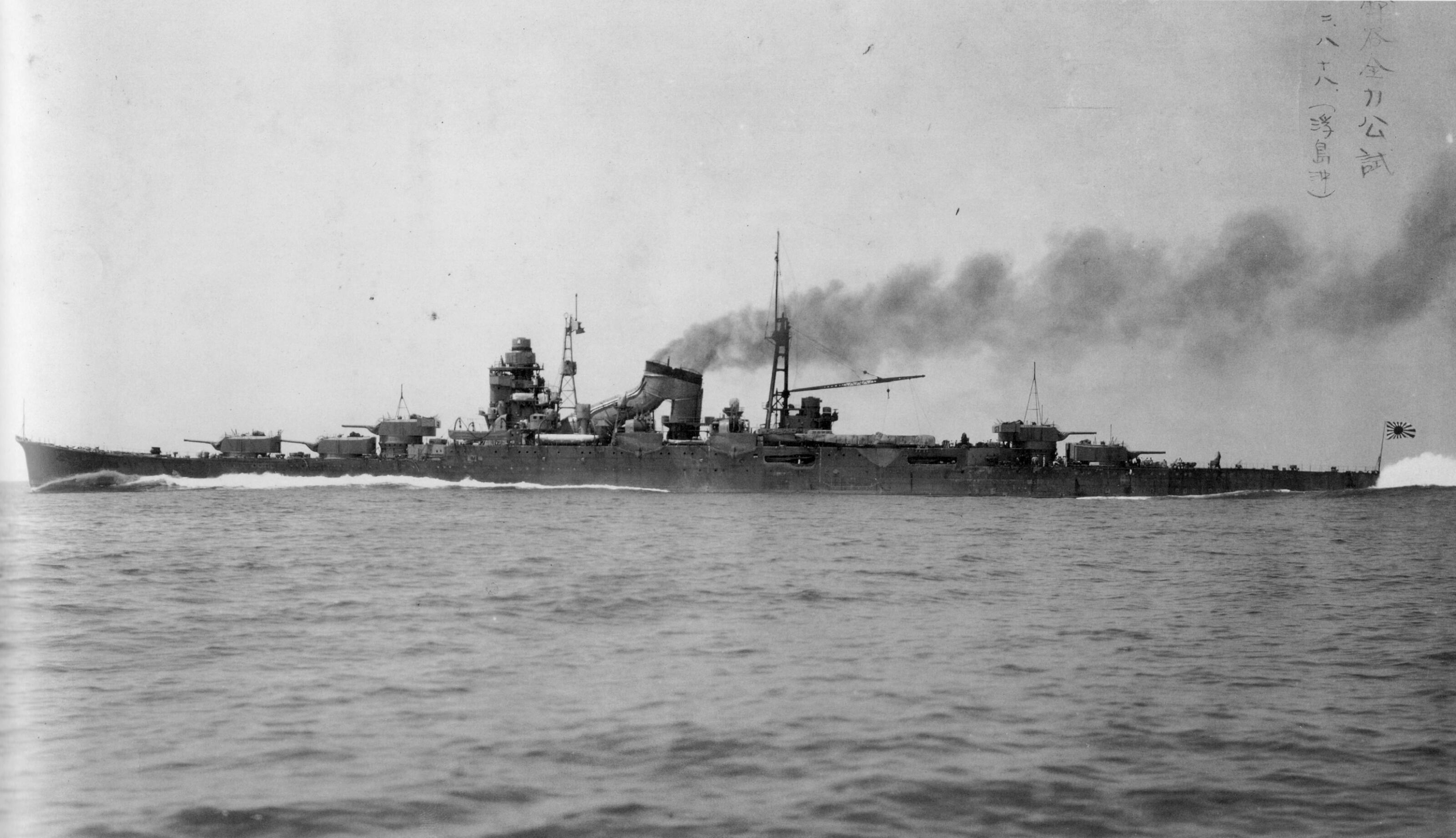
- Suzuya during trials off Tateyama, 18 August 1937

History

Empire of Japan
- Name: Suzuya
- Namesake: Suzuya River in Karafuto
- Ordered: 1931 Fiscal Year
- Builder: Yokosuka Naval Arsenal
- Cost: 24,833,950 Yen
- Laid down: 11 December 1933
- Launched: 20 November 1934
- Commissioned: 31 October 1937
- Stricken: 20 December 1944
- Fate: Sunk during the Battle off Samar, 25 October 1944

General characteristics
- Class & type: Mogami-class cruiser
- Displacement: 8,500 tons (official, initial); 13,670 tons (final)
- Length: 200.6 metres (658 ft)
- Beam: 20.2 metres (66 ft)
- Draught: 5.9 metres (19 ft)
- Propulsion: 4-shaft geared turbines; 8 Kampon boilers; 154,000 shp (115,000 kW)
- Speed: 37-knot (69 km/h) (initial); 35.5 knots (65.7 km/h) (final)
- Range: 8,032 nmi (14,875 km) at 14 knots (26 km/h)
- Capacity: 2243 tons heavy oil
- Complement: 850-950
- Armament: (initial); 15 × 15.5 cm/60 3rd Year Type naval gun (5×3); 8 × 12.7 cm/40 Type 89 naval guns (4×2); 8 × Type 96 25 mm AT/AA Guns (4x2); 4 × 13.2 mm (0.52 in) AA guns (2x2); 18 × Type 93 torpedoes; (final); 10 × 20 cm/50 3rd Year Type naval guns (5×2); 8 × 12.7 cm/40 Type 89 naval gun (4×2); 50 × Type 96 25 mm AT/AA Gun guns (8x3,4x2,18x1); 24 × Type 93 torpedoes
- Armor: 100-125 mm (belt); 35-60 mm (deck); 25 mm turret
- Aircraft carried: 3 x floatplanes
- Aviation facilities: 2 aircraft catapults

Suzuya (Japanese: 鈴谷; named after Suzuya River) was the third of four vessels in the Mogami class of heavy cruisers in the Imperial Japanese Navy.

== Background and design ==
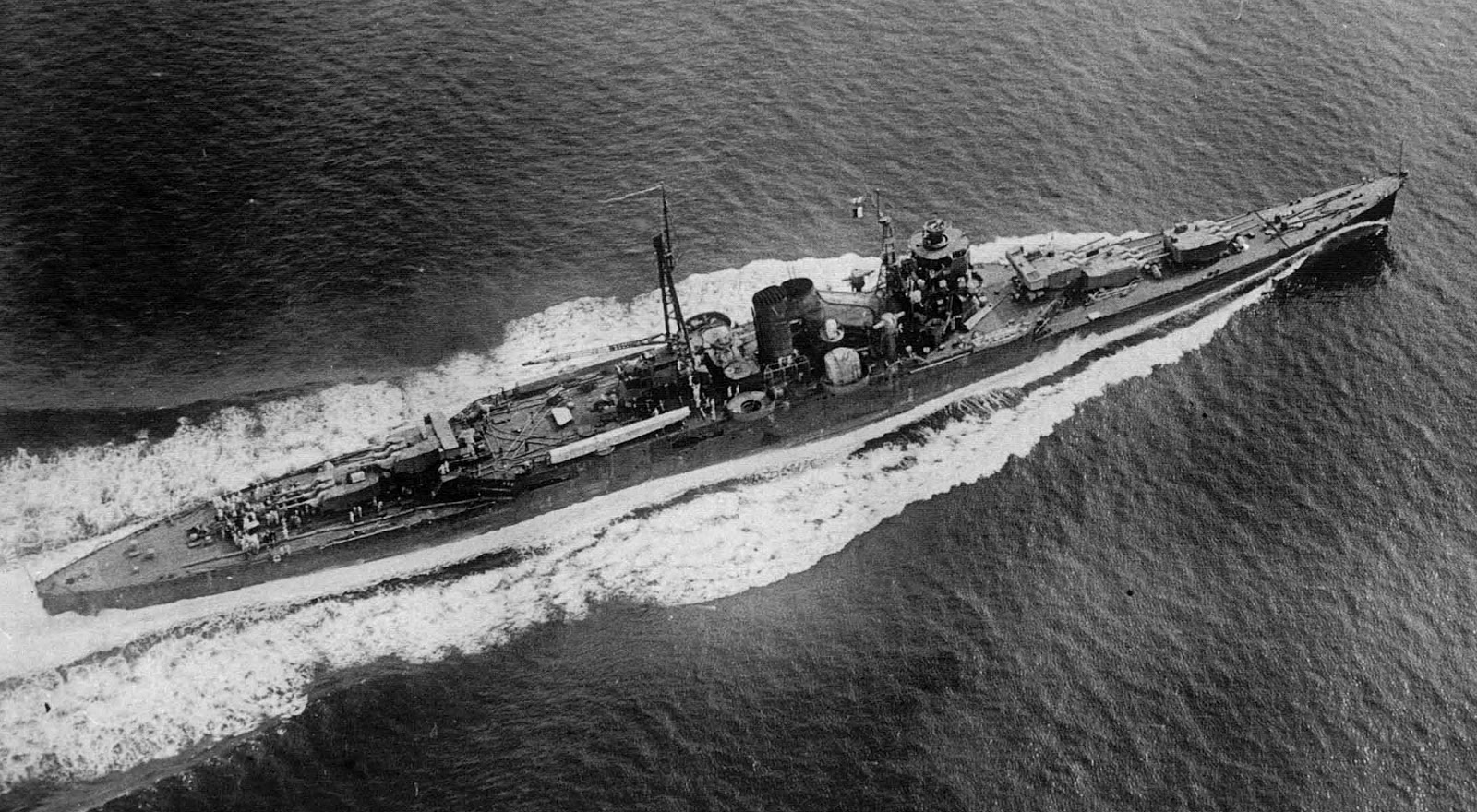
Overhead view of Suzuya during sea trials, 1935.

Built under the Maru-1 Naval Armaments Supplement Programme, the Mogami-class cruisers were designed to the maximum limits allowed by the Washington Naval Treaty, using the latest technology. This resulted in the choice of the dual purpose (DP) 15.5 cm/60 3rd Year Type naval guns as the main battery in five triple turrets capable of 55° elevation. These were the first Japanese cruisers with triple turrets. Secondary armament included eight 12.7 cm/40 Type 89 naval guns in four twin turrets, and 18 Type 93 Long Lance torpedoes for four rotating triple mounts.

To save weight, electric welding was used, as was aluminum in the superstructure, and a single funnel stack. New impulse geared turbine engines, driving four shafts with three-bladed propellers gave a top speed of 35 knots (65 km/h; 40 mph), which was better than most contemporary cruiser designs and the Mogami class had twin balanced rudders, rather than the single rudder of previous Japanese cruiser designs.

The class was designed from the start to be upgraded into heavy cruisers with the replacement of their main battery with 20 cm/50 3rd Year Type naval guns in twin turrets.

However, in initial trials in 1935, Mogami and Mikuma were plagued with technical problems due to their untested equipment, welding defects, and also proved to be top-heavy with stability problems in heavy weather. Both vessels, and their yet-to-be-completed sisters, Kumano and Suzuya underwent a complete and very costly rebuilding program. Once rebuilt, the design, with its very high speed, armor protection, and heavy armament was among the best in the world during World War II.

== Service career ==
=== Early career ===
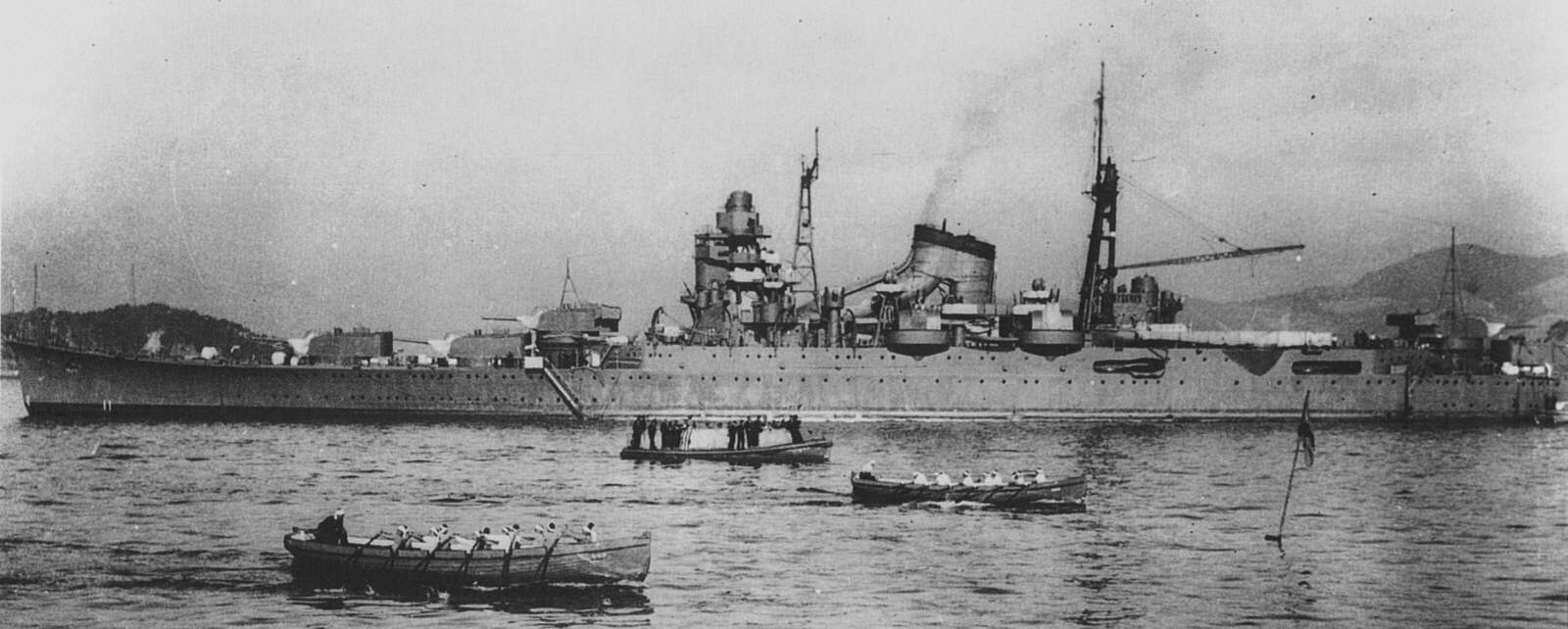
Suzuya in Kure Naval harbor, January 5, 1939. Taken from battleship Fusō.

Suzuya was launched on 20 November 1934 at Yokosuka Naval Arsenal in a ceremony attended by Emperor Hirohito. Following the Japanese ship-naming conventions, the ship was named after the Suzuya River on Karafuto (present day Sakhalin, Russia). She was completed in January 1936, but on completion was immediately placed in the reserves while waiting for dry dock space to permit reconstruction and modifications based on experience gained during trials of Mogami to strengthen her welds, and to add bulges to her hull to reduce weight. She was officially commissioned on 31 October 1937; however instead of entering active service, she immediately returned to dry dock for refit work to upgrade her main battery to the heavy cruiser format with 20 cm/50 3rd Year Type naval guns. These upgrades were completed on 30 September 1939, at which time she was assigned to Kure Naval District as Cruiser Division 7 of the IJN 2nd Fleet with her sister ships Mogami, Mikuma and Kumano.

Suzuya, under the command of Captain Masatomi Kimura, was dispatched on 23 January 1941 as part of a show of force following the Battle of Ko Chang in the Franco-Thai War. She returned to Kure for maintenance, and then took part in training exercises and drills in Japanese home waters though June. From July 1941, she participated in the occupation of Cochinchina, French Indochina from her forward operating base on Hainan, after Japan and Vichy French authorities reached an understanding on use of air facilities and harbors.

At the time of the attack on Pearl Harbor, Suzuya was assigned to cover the invasion of Malaya as part of Vice Admiral Jisaburo Ozawa's First Southern Expeditionary Fleet, providing close support for landings of Japanese troops at Singora, Pattani and Kota Bharu.

On 9 December 1941, the Japanese submarine I-65 reported sighting of Royal Navy Force Z (the Royal Navy battleship HMS Prince of Wales, battlecruiser HMS Repulse and supporting destroyers). The report was received by light cruiser Sendai, which relayed the message to Admiral Ozawa aboard his flagship, Chōkai. However, the reception was poor and the message took another 90 minutes to decode. Moreover, I-65's report was incorrect about the heading of Force Z. Two Aichi E13A1 "Jake" floatplanes from Suzuya and Kumano attempted to shadow Force Z, but both were forced to ditch due to lack of fuel. Only Suzuya's crew was recovered. The following day, Force Z was overwhelmed by torpedo bombers of the 22nd Air Flotilla from Indochina.

In December 1941, Suzuya was tasked with the invasion of Sarawak, together with Kumano, covering landings of Japanese troops at Miri. From her base at Cam Rahn Bay, she sortied with Kumano to cover landings of troops at Anambas, Endau, Palembang and Banka Island, Sabang on Sumatra and Java in the Netherlands East Indies from the end of December 1941 to the middle of March. Suzuya also participated in the seizure of the Andaman Islands in the Indian Ocean on 20 March 1942.

=== Indian Ocean Raids ===
From 1 April 1942 CruDiv 7 based from Mergui, Burma joined with CruDiv 4 to participate in the Indian Ocean raids. Mikuma, Mogami and destroyer Amagiri detached and formed the "Southern Group", which hunted for merchant shipping in the Bay of Bengal, while Suzuya, Kumano, and Shiokaze covered the northern areas. Chōkai, light cruiser Yura, aircraft carrier Ryūjō and destroyers Ayanami, Yūgiri, Asagiri formed a center group to reinforce northern or southern wings as necessary. Over the next few weeks, the northern groups claimed kills on a 4,986-ton American merchant vessel Exmoor, British 7,621-ton freighter Autoclycus, British 9,066-ton freighter Malda and the 2,440-ton British freighter Shinkuang. In total the commerce raiding expedition sank over twenty ships during their brief stay in the Bay of Bengal. Afterwards, Suzuya was withdrawn back to Kure for repairs, and was then sent to Guam to join the Midway Invasion Task Force.

=== Battle of Midway ===
On 5 June, Admiral Isoroku Yamamoto, CINC of the Combined Fleet ordered CruDiv 7 to shell Midway Island in preparation for a Japanese landing. CruDiv 7 and DesDiv 8 were 410 miles (660 km) away from the island, so they made a high-speed dash at 35 knots (65 km/h). The sea was choppy and the destroyers lagged behind. At 2120, the order was canceled. However, this dash placed CruDiv 7 within torpedo range of the submarine USS Tambor, which was spotted by Kumano. Kumano signaled a 45° simultaneous turn to starboard to avoid possible torpedoes. The emergency turn was correctly executed by the flagship and Suzuya, but the third ship in the line, Mikuma, erroneously made a 90° turn. Behind her, Mogami's navigator, watching Suzuya, did not see Mikuma's movement and turned 45° as commanded. This resulted in a collision in which Mogami rammed Mikuma's portside, below the bridge. Both vessels were severely damaged. Suzuya returned to Kure on 23 June and CruDiv 7 was transferred to the IJN 3rd Fleet.

After returning to Singapore, CruDiv 7 (Suzuya and Kumano) were tasked with covering the Invasion of Burma from 28 July 1942. While in the Straits of Malacca, Suzuya was attacked by Royal Netherlands Navy submarine O 23, which fired four torpedoes, but missed. However, with the American invasion of Guadalcanal on 7 August, Suzuya was quickly recalled to the Pacific front.

=== Operations in the Solomon Islands ===
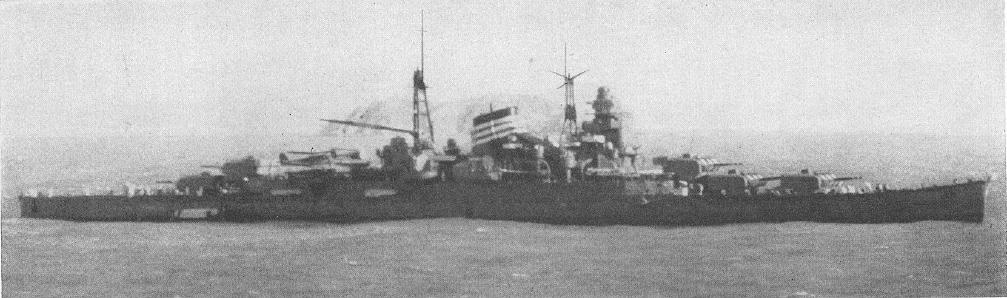
Suzuya

On 24 August 1942, CruDiv 7 joined Vice Admiral Chuichi Nagumo's Carrier Strike Force (Shōkaku, Zuikaku, Zuihō and Ryūjō) with cruiser Chikuma northeast of Guadalcanal. During the resultant Battle of the Eastern Solomons, aircraft from the carrier USS Saratoga sank the aircraft carrier Ryūjō; but Suzuya was too far away to be in the combat. Suzuya subsequently patrolled between Truk and the Solomon Islands through the middle of October.

On 26 October 1942, Nagumo's Carrier Strike force engaged the aircraft carriers USS Enterprise, USS Hornet, battleship USS South Dakota and cruiser USS San Juan in the Battle of Santa Cruz, sinking Hornet and damaging other ships. The battle was a long-range air battle, and again Suzuya was far enough away to avoid direct combat.

In early November, CruDiv 7 was ordered to reinforce Vice Admiral Gunichi Mikawa's Eighth Fleet at Shortland, and participated on the bombardment of Henderson Field on Guadalcanal on 14 November. Suzuya, cruisers Maya, Tenryū, Chōkai, Kinugasa and Isuzu and destroyers Kazagumo, Makigumo, Michishio, Yūgumo, Asashio and Arashio bombarded the air strip with 989 203 mm (8 in) shells. On withdrawing, the task force was attacked by the submarine USS Flying Fish (which missed) and aircraft from Enterprise and Guadalcanal. Kinugasa was sunk, Chōkai and Maya were damaged; Suzuya escaped unscathed, and through early January 1943 continued her patrols and coverage of transport convoys between Truk, Kavieng and Rabaul.

Suzuya returned to Kure on 12 January 1943 for repairs, at which time additional AA guns and a Type 21 air search radar were installed. She returned to Kure again on 6 April, at which time her dual 13.2 mm (0.52 in) machine guns were replaced by two triple-mount Type 96 25 mm AT/AA Guns.

Suzuya departed Yokosuka on 16 June 1943, with another major resupply convoy to the Solomon Islands, and shuttled back and forth from Truk to Rabaul through the end of the year. On 18 July, Suzuya was attacked by Guadalcanal-based United States Marine Corps TBM Avengers off Kolombangara, but escaped without damage. On 3 November, Suzuya with Mogami and Chikuma were dispatched from Rabaul to bombard American forces that just landed at Empress Augusta Bay, Bougainville Island, but the raid was prevented to reach gun range thanks to US Admiral Merill's victory, sinking the cruiser Sendai. Suzuya was back in Rabaul harbor on 5 November, when the United States launched an attack with 97 planes from the carriers Saratoga and Princeton. Suzuya was one of the few ships not hit in the raid.

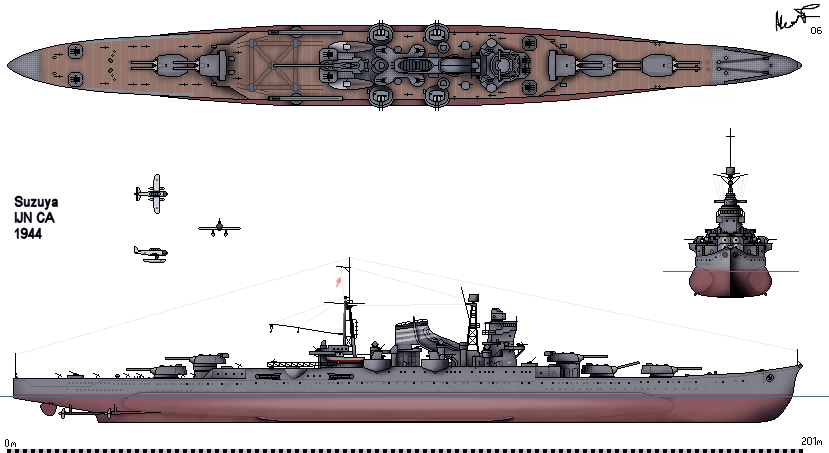
Line drawing of Suzuya as she appeared in 1944

On 1 February, Suzuya assisted with the evacuation of Truk. Suzuya went into refit at Singapore on 24 March, at which time an additional eight single-mount Type 96 25 mm AA guns were installed.

=== Battle of the Philippine Sea ===
On 13 June 1944, Admiral Soemu Toyoda, CINC, Combined Fleet, activated the "A-Go" plan for the defense of the Mariana Islands. Suzuya was assigned to Admiral Kurita's "Force C" with the battleships Yamato, Musashi and aircraft carriers Zuihō, Chiyoda, Chitose, and cruisers Atago, Takao, Maya, Chōkai, Kumano, Chikuma, Tone, and Noshiro.

Later in the day, the Mobile Fleet's aircraft attacked Task Force 58 off Saipan, but suffered overwhelming losses in the "Great Marianas Turkey Shoot". At 2030 on 20 June, two hours after she was hit by torpedoes by Grumman TBM Avengers from the aircraft carrier USS Belleau Wood, the Hiyō exploded and sank. That night, Suzuya retired with the remnants of the Japanese fleet to Okinawa.

Back in Kure on 25 June 1944, Suzuya was refit once again. Four triple-mount and 10 single-mount Type 96 25 mm AA guns were installed, bringing the total to 50 barrels (14×3 and 18×1) and a Type 22 surface search radar and Type 13 air-search radar were fitted. On 8 July, Suzuya departed Kure back for Singapore and Brunei, and was involved in fleet training and patrols in the Singapore-Brunei area through October. By this time, her Type 22 Kai 4M radar was upgraded to Kai 4S for fire control.

=== Battle of Leyte Gulf ===
In late October, the Japanese fleet assembled in Brunei in response to the threatened American invasion of the Philippines. On 25 October 1944, in the Battle off Samar, Suzuya engaged the three "Jeep carriers" in American Task Group 77.4, but was attacked by ten TBM Avenger torpedo-bombers. A near-miss destroyed her port propeller. At 1050, Suzuya was attacked by 30 other carrier aircraft. Another near-miss caused the Long Lance torpedoes in Suzuya's No. 1 torpedo tubes to explode, which in turn started other fires and damaged the starboard engine rooms and the No. 7 boiler room. Suzuya was abandoned at 1150, and at 1322 sank at 11°45.2′N 126°11.2′E. Destroyer Okinami took off Captain Teraoka and 401 crewmen. US warships later rescued more sailors.

Suzuya was removed from the navy list on 20 December 1944. Though it has yet to be located, the wreck of the Suzuya is believed to lie in some 27,600 feet (8,400 meters) of water, making her one of the deepest shipwrecks on record.
