= Japanese destroyer Ōshio =

Asashio-class destroyer

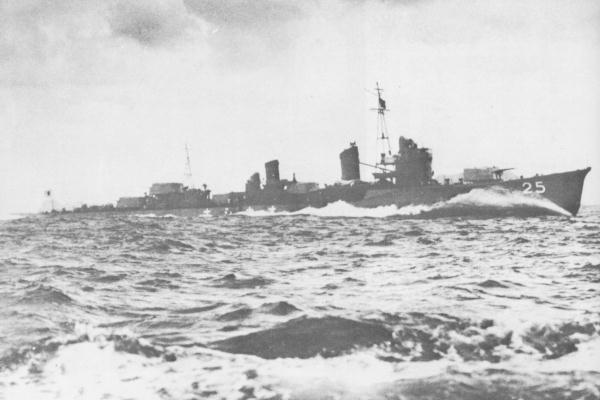
- Ōshio on trials

History

Empire of Japan
- Name: Ōshio
- Ordered: 1934 Maru-2 Program
- Builder: Maizuru Naval Arsenal
- Laid down: 5 August 1936
- Launched: 19 April 1937
- Commissioned: 31 October 1937
- Stricken: 1 April 1943
- Fate: Torpedoed and sunk, 20 February 1943

General characteristics
- Class & type: Asashio-class destroyer
- Displacement: 2,370 long tons (2,408 t)
- Length: 111 m (364 ft) pp; 115 m (377 ft 4 in)waterline; 118.3 m (388 ft 1 in) OA
- Beam: 10.3 m (33 ft 10 in)
- Draft: 3.7 m (12 ft 2 in)
- Propulsion: 2-shaft geared turbine, 3 boilers, 50,000 shp (37,285 kW)
- Speed: 35 knots (40 mph; 65 km/h)
- Range: 5,700 nmi (10,600 km) at 10 kn (19 km/h); 960 nmi (1,780 km) at 34 kn (63 km/h)
- Complement: 200
- Armament: 6 × 12.7 cm/50 Type 3 DP guns; 4 × Type 96 AA guns OR; 4 × Type 93 AA guns (records uncertain); 8 × 24 in (610 mm) torpedo tubes; 36 depth charges

Ōshio (大潮, High Tide) was the second of ten Asashio-class destroyers built for the Imperial Japanese Navy in the mid-1930s under the Circle Two Supplementary Naval Expansion Program (Maru Ni Keikaku).

== History ==
The Asashio-class destroyers were larger and more capable that the preceding Shiratsuyu class, as Japanese naval architects were no longer constrained by the provisions of the London Naval Treaty. These light cruiser-sized vessels were designed to take advantage of Japan’s lead in torpedo technology, and to accompany the Japanese main striking force and in both day and night attacks against the United States Navy as it advanced across the Pacific Ocean, according to Japanese naval strategic projections. Despite being one of the most powerful classes of destroyers in the world at the time of their completion, none survived the Pacific War.

Ōshio, built at the Maizuru Naval Arsenal was laid down on 5 August 1936, launched on 19 April 1937 and commissioned on 31 October 1937.

== Operational history ==
At the time of the attack on Pearl Harbor, Ōshio was assigned to Destroyer Division 8 (Desdiv 8), and a member of Destroyer Squadron 2 (Desron 2) of the IJN 2nd Fleet, escorting Admiral Nobutake Kondō's Southern Force Main Body out of Mako Guard District as distant cover to the Malaya and Philippines invasion forces in December 1941.

Ōshio escorted a Malaya troop convoy from Mako towards Singora, then put into Hong Kong on 5 January 1942. She escorted another troop convoy to Davao, and then accompanied the Ambon invasion force (31 January), the Makassar invasion force (8 February) and the Bali/Lombok invasion force (18 February).

On the night of 19 February 1942, Ōshio participated in the Battle of Badoeng Strait. Ōshio was guarding the transport Sasago Maru off Bali when an Allied fleet attacked. During the battle, Ōshio has been credited with assisting in sinking the Dutch destroyer HNLMS Piet Hein with a torpedo, plus gunnery hits on the Dutch light cruiser HNLMS Tromp and the American destroyer USS Stewart. Ōshio suffered medium damage, with seven crewmen killed.

In March, after emergency repairs at Makassar, Ōshio returned to Yokosuka Naval Arsenal for repairs, which lasted to the end of the year.

In early January 1943, Ōshio was sent from Maizuru to Shortland Island, and participated in three missions to evacuate surviving Japanese troops from Guadalcanal in early February. On 20 February, together with her sister ship Arashio, she was attacked by the submarine USS Albacore off Wewak, New Guinea. Ōshio was hit by a torpedo, which flooded her engine room and killed eight crewmen. Arashio attempted to tow her, but her keel was fatally damaged, and she sank approximately 70 nautical miles (130 km) northeast of Manus Island at position 00°50′S 146°06′E. She was removed from the navy list on 1 April 1943.
