= Japanese destroyer Asashio (1936) =

Asashio-class destroyer

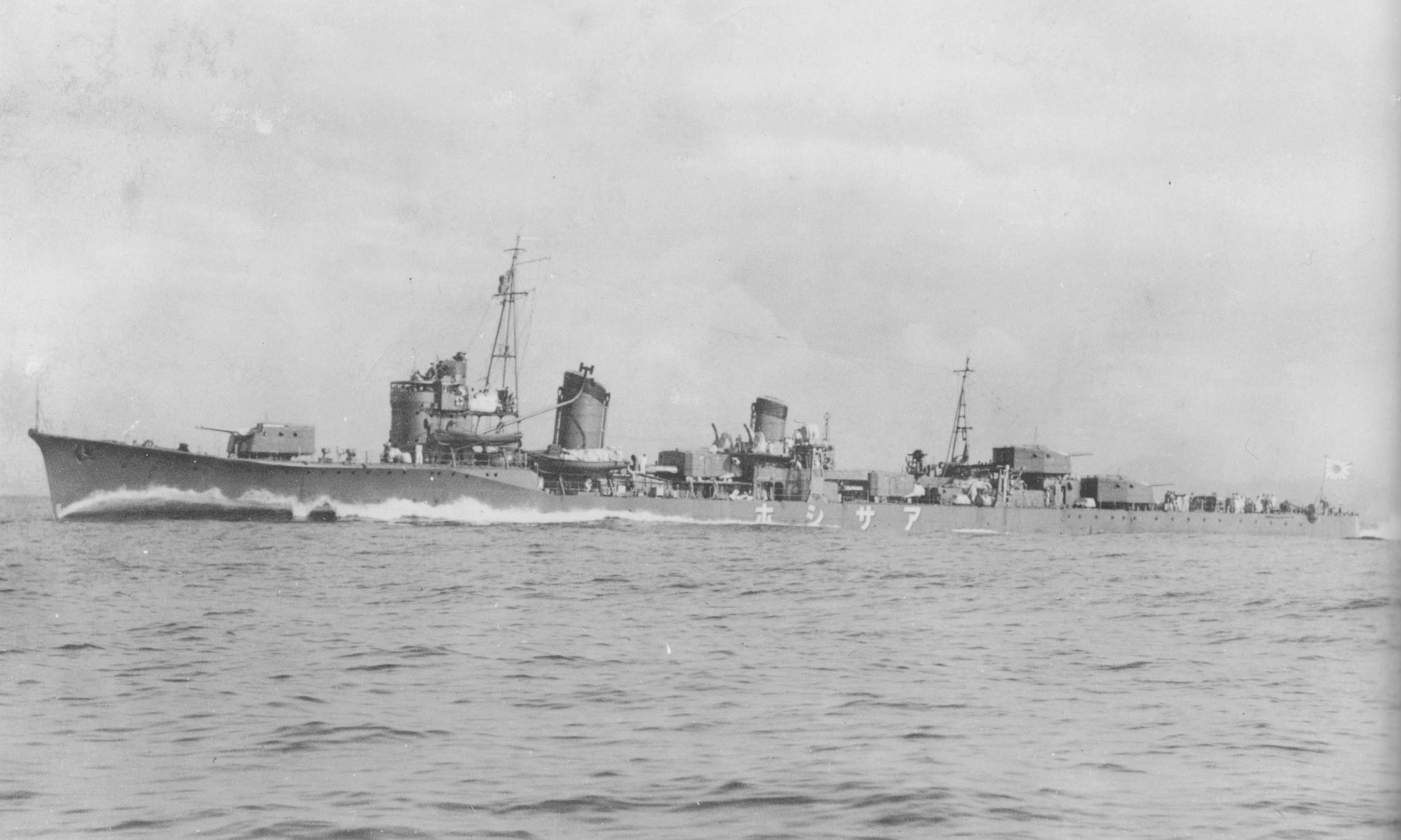
- Asashio during sea trials, July 1937.

History

Empire of Japan
- Name: Asashio
- Ordered: 1934
- Builder: Sasebo Naval Arsenal
- Laid down: 7 September 1935
- Launched: 16 December 1936
- Commissioned: 31 August 1937
- Stricken: 1 April 1943
- Fate: Sunk by air attack in Battle of the Bismarck Sea, 3 March 1943

General characteristics
- Class & type: Asashio-class destroyer
- Displacement: 2,370 long tons (2,408 t)
- Length: 111 m (364 ft) pp; 115 m (377 ft 4 in) waterline
- Beam: 10.3 m (33 ft 10 in)
- Draft: 3.7 m (12 ft 2 in)
- Propulsion: 2 shaft Kampon geared turbines; 3 boilers, 50,000 hp (37,000 kW)
- Speed: 35 knots (40 mph; 65 km/h)
- Range: 5,700 nmi (10,600 km) at 10 kn (19 km/h)
- Complement: 226
- Armament: 6 × 12.7 cm/50 Type 3 naval guns DP guns (3×2), (early) 3 × (later) up to 28 × Type 96 25 mm AT/AA Gun, up to 4 × Type 93 13 mm machine guns, 8 × 610 mm (24 in) torpedo tubes (2×4), 36 depth charges

Asashio anchored in the Yangtze River, December 1937

Asashio (朝潮; "Morning Tide") was the lead ship of the ten Asashio-class destroyers built for the Imperial Japanese Navy in the mid-1930s under the Circle Two Program (Maru Ni Keikaku).

== History ==
The Asashio-class destroyers were larger and more capable that the preceding Shiratsuyu class, as Japanese naval architects were no longer constrained by the provisions of the London Naval Treaty. These light cruiser-sized vessels were designed to take advantage of Japan's lead in torpedo technology, and to accompany the Japanese main striking force and in both day and night attacks against the United States Navy as it advanced across the Pacific Ocean, according to Japanese naval strategic projections. Despite being one of the most powerful classes of destroyers in the world at the time of their completion, none survived the Pacific War.

Asashio, built at the Sasebo Naval Arsenal was laid down on 7 September 1935, launched on 16 December 1936 and commissioned on 31 August 1937. During trials, Asashio experienced steering problems and her maneuverability was unacceptable. The class was retrofitted with a redesigned stern and rudder design to resolve the problem. Other problems, chiefly involving the new and sophisticated 50,000 hp (37,000 kW) turbines, were also resolved.

== Operational history ==
At the time of the attack on Pearl Harbor, Asashio served as the flagship of Destroyer Division 8 (Desdiv 8), and a member of Destroyer Squadron 2 (Desron 2), escorting Admiral Nobutake Kondō's Southern Force Main Body out of Mako Guard District as distant cover to the Malaya and Philippines invasion forces in December 1941. Asashio escorted a Malaya troop convoy from Mako towards Singora, then put into Hong Kong on 5 January 1942. She escorted another troop convoy to Davao, and then accompanied the Ambon invasion force (31 January), the Makassar invasion force (8 February) and the Bali/Lombok invasion force (18 February).

=== Battle of Badung Strait ===
On the night of 19 February 1942, Asashio participated in the Battle of Badoeng Strait. Asashio was guarding the transport Sasago Maru off Bali when an Allied fleet attacked. Asashio has been credited with sinking the Dutch destroyer HNLMS Piet Hein with a torpedo, plus gunnery hits on the Dutch light cruiser HNLMS Tromp and the American destroyer USS Stewart. Asashio suffered light damage: she was hit once with a 76 mm (3 in) shell from Tromp, losing a searchlight, four men killed, and 11 wounded. She towed her damaged sister ship Michishio to Makassar after the battle.

In March, Desdiv 8 returned to Yokosuka. In April, Desdiv 8 was reassigned to Destroyer Squadron 4 (Desron 4). Desron 4 sailed to Manila Bay to assist in the shelling of Corregidor in late April and May 1942, returning to Kure, before deploying to Guam.

=== Battle of Midway ===
At the Battle of Midway on 4–6 June 1942, Asashio and Desron 4 escorted Admiral Takeo Kurita's Support Group covering the Midway troop convoy. She suffered medium damage in air attacks on 6 June, when she was hit by one 500 lb (230 kg) bomb, which killed 22 crewmen. She assisted her sister ship Arashio in rescuing 240 survivors from the heavy cruiser Mikuma, then escorted the crippled cruiser Mogami to Truk on 14 June. After emergency repairs by the repair ship Akashi, Asashio sailed to Sasebo for more extensive repairs on 29 June. She was then reassigned to Desdiv 8 and was based at Yokosuka Naval District.

=== Naval battles of Guadalcanal ===
After a successful supply run to Jaluit and troop transport runs to Guadalcanal in September and October, Asashio was part of the escort for Admiral Gunichi Mikawa's Support Force during several naval battles near Guadalcanal in November, but did not see combat. On 14 November, Asashio assisted the damaged light cruiser Isuzu. Desdiv 8 then made three "Tokyo Express" troop transport runs from Rabaul to Buna in late November and early December 1942. After the first, Asashio towed the damaged destroyer Umikaze back to Rabaul on 21 November. The third run was aborted due to Allied air attack on 8 December; Asashio was temporarily disabled by near-misses by bombs off of her stern. The division then made a successful troop transport run to Finschhafen on 18 December.

On 7 January, Asashio and Desdiv 8 escorted Zuikaku, Mutsu and Suzuya from Truk to Kure, then returned to Truk. On 7 February, Desdiv 8 repeated the escort mission to Kure with the carrier Chūyō. The division then escorted another convoy from Truk to Rabaul, and a troop transport run from Rabaul to Madang and back. Desdiv 8 was assigned to Destroyer Squadron 3 of the IJN 8th Fleet on 25 February.

=== Battle of the Bismarck Sea ===
On 3 March 1943, Asashio and Desron 3 escorted a troop convoy from Rabaul towards Lae. In the Battle of the Bismarck Sea, the convoy was hit by an Allied air attack. After weathering the first waves, Asashio was bombed and strafed later in the day while attempting to rescue survivors from destroyer Arashio and troopship Nojima Maru. She was lost with some 200 men, approximately 45 nautical miles (83 km) southeast of Finschhafen, New Guinea at position (07°15′S 148°15′E). Among the casualties was Destroyer Division 8 Commander, Captain Yasuo Sato. Few survivors escaped in a lifeboat that also rescued Nojima Maru's captain.

Asashio was removed from the navy list on 1 April 1943.
