= Japanese destroyer Michishio =

Asashio-class destroyer

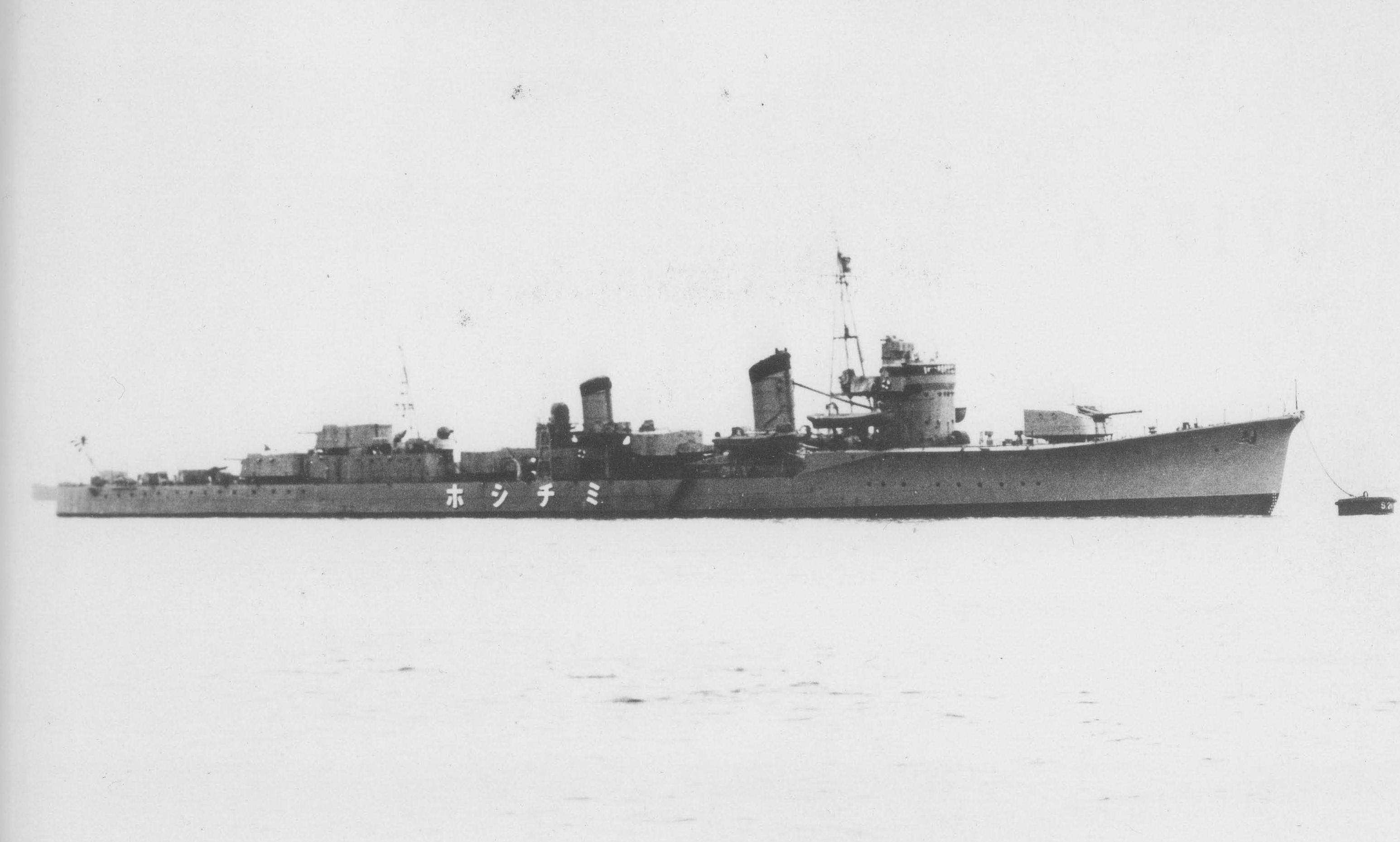
- Michishio on 31 October 1937.

History

Empire of Japan
- Name: Michishio
- Ordered: 1934 Maru-2 Program
- Builder: Fujinagata Shipyards
- Laid down: 5 November 1935
- Launched: 15 March 1937
- Commissioned: 31 October 1937
- Stricken: 10 January 1945
- Fate: Sunk by USS McDermut and USS Hutchins during the Battle of Surigao Strait, 25 October 1944

General characteristics
- Class & type: Asashio-class destroyer
- Displacement: 2,370 long tons (2,408 t)
- Length: 111 m (364 ft) pp; 115 m (377 ft 4 in)waterline; 118.3 m (388 ft 1 in) OA
- Beam: 10.3 m (33 ft 10 in)
- Draft: 3.7 m (12 ft 2 in)
- Propulsion: 2-shaft geared turbine, 3 boilers, 50,000 shp (37,285 kW)
- Speed: 35 knots (40 mph; 65 km/h)
- Range: 5,700 nmi (10,600 km) at 10 kn (19 km/h); 960 nmi (1,780 km) at 34 kn (63 km/h)
- Complement: 200
- Armament: 6 × 12.7 cm/50 Type 3 DP guns; up to 28 × Type 96 AA guns; up to 4 × Type 93 AA guns; 8 × 24 in (610 mm) torpedo tubes; 36 depth charges

Michishio (満潮, Full Tide) was the third of ten Asashio-class destroyers built for the Imperial Japanese Navy in the mid-1930s under the Circle Two Supplementary Naval Expansion Program (Maru Ni Keikaku).

== History ==
The Asashio-class destroyers were larger and more capable that the preceding Shiratsuyu class, as Japanese naval architects were no longer constrained by the provisions of the London Naval Treaty. These light cruiser-sized vessels were designed to take advantage of Japan’s lead in torpedo technology, and to accompany the Japanese main striking force and in both day and night attacks against the United States Navy as it advanced across the Pacific Ocean, according to Japanese naval strategic projections. Despite being one of the most powerful classes of destroyers in the world at the time of their completion, none survived the Pacific War.

Michishio, built at the Fujinagata Shipyards in Osaka was laid down on 5 November 1935, launched on 15 March 1937 and commissioned on 31 October 1937.

== Operational history ==
On commissioning, Michishio was assigned to support Japanese combat operations in the Second Sino-Japanese War from November to December 1937. However, following reports of operational problems with her sister ship Asashio, she was withdrawn to Sasebo Naval Arsenal for modifications and replacement of her engines.

At the time of the attack on Pearl Harbor, Michishio was assigned to Destroyer Division 8 (Desdiv 8), and a member of Destroyer Squadron 2 (Desron 2) of the IJN 2nd Fleet, escorting Admiral Nobutake Kondō's Southern Force Main Body out of Mako Guard District as distant cover to the Malaya and Philippines invasion forces in December 1941.

Michishio escorted a troop convoy from Mako towards Singora, then put into Hong Kong on 5 January 1942. She escorted another troop convoy to Davao, and then accompanied the Ambon invasion force (31 January), the Makassar invasion force (8 February ) and the Bali/Lombok invasion force (18 February).

On the night of 19 February, Michishio participated in the Battle of Badoeng Strait. Michishio was guarding the transport Sagami Maru off Bali when an Allied fleet attacked. Michishio was caught in crossfire by four United States Navy destroyers and severely damaged, with 13 crewmen dead and 83 injured. She was towed by the destroyer Asashio to Makassar for repairs.

In March, after emergency repairs at Makassar, Michishio returned to Yokosuka Naval Arsenal for further repairs, which lasted to the end of October. Returning to active duty at Rabaul at the end of October, Michishio was assigned to three "Tokyo Express" transport runs in early November. During the Naval Battle of Guadalcanal on 14 November, she was damaged by United States Navy aircraft, and had to be towed to Shortland Island for repairs. However, field repairs proved impossible, and she was towed to Rabaul, then to Truk, and finally to Yokosuka, arriving on 17 March 1943. Michishio remained under repair at Yokosuka Naval Arsenal to 14 November, during which time one of her main gun turrets was replaced by two triple Type 96 AA guns. She returned to Truk at the end of 1943 and escorted the cruisers Kumano and Suzuya on a mission to Kavieng at the end of the year.

In January 1944, Michishio returned to Kure Naval District together with the battleship Yamato, and escorted a troop convoy back to Truk at the end of that month. For the end two months, she served largely as escort for the battleship Musashi

During the Battle of the Philippine Sea, Michishio was in Admiral Takatsugu Jōjima's “Force B”, but did not see combat during that battle. Afterwards, she assisted the torpedoed tanker Itsukushima Maru at Negros Island, and escorted the battleship Fusō from Davao to Kure. She accompanied the battleship Haruna in August from Sasebo to Singapore and then escorted supply convoys to Brunei.

During the Battle of Surigao Strait, Michishio was in Admiral Shōji Nishimura's Southern Force. On 25 October, she was struck by a torpedo fired by USS McDermut, and then finished off by USS Hutchins at position 10°25′N 125°23′E. Michishio was removed from the navy list on 10 January 1945.

== Rediscovery ==
Michishio's wreck was discovered along with sister Yamagumo on 27 November 2017 by Microsoft co-founder Paul Allen's research ship RV Petrel. The wrecks are 1 mile (1.6 km) apart in 380 ft (117 m) of water. Both wrecks are heavily encrusted with marine growth which, combined with their close proximity, made it impossible to distinguish the two.
