= Battle of Badung Strait =

1942 naval battle on the Pacific campaign of WWII

Coordinates: 8°37′50″S 115°23′17″E

- Part of World War II, Pacific War
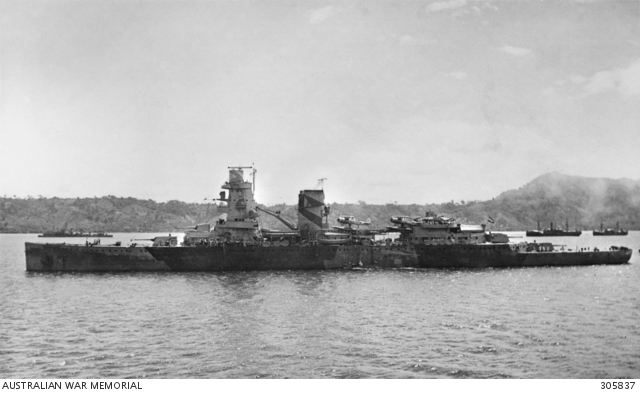
- HNLMS De Ruyter off Java in 1942.
Date	19–20 February 1942
Location	Badung Strait off Bali in the Dutch East Indies
Result	Japanese victory

Belligerents
Netherlands; United States; United Kingdom	Japan

Commanders and leaders
Karel Doorman	(Empire of Japan) Kyūji Kubo

Strength
3 cruisers 7 destroyers 2 submarines 20 aircraft	4 destroyers 2 transports

Casualties and losses
1 cruiser damaged 1 destroyer sunk 1 destroyer damaged and — later scuttled —	25 killed 83 wounded 3 destroyers damaged 1 transport damaged

The Battle of Badung Strait was a naval battle of the Pacific campaign of World War II, fought on the night of 19/20 February 1942 in Badung Strait (not to be confused with the West Java city of Bandung) between the American-British-Dutch-Australian Command (ABDA) and the Imperial Japanese Navy. In the engagement, four Japanese destroyers defeated an Allied force that outnumbered and outgunned them, sinking the Dutch destroyer Piet Hein and escorting two transports to safety. The battle demonstrated the Japanese Navy's considerable superiority over the Allies in night fighting, which lasted until the Battle of Cape St. George in November 1943.

== Background ==
A battalion of the 48th Infantry Division of the Imperial Japanese Army landed in Bali on 18 February 1942. Dutch Admiral Karel Doorman's naval forces were scattered around Indonesia, but the invasion of Bali could not be ignored; it would give the Japanese an airbase within range of the ABDA naval base at Surabaya, so he sent in all available ships. The short notice gave no time to concentrate his ships; accordingly, several Allied forces were to attack the Japanese.

== Battle ==
On 19 February, the first Allied vessel to engage was the submarine USS Seawolf, which damaged one of the Japanese transports. Later that day, 13 USAAF heavy bombers and seven A-24 Banshees attacked the convoy, but succeeded only in damaging the transport Sagami Maru. On Bali, W.P. Roodenburg's Balinese militia deserted, while the Japanese captured Denpasar airfield intact.

The Japanese were aware that their invasion convoy was likely to be attacked again, so they retreated north as soon as possible. The cruiser Nagara and destroyers Wakaba, Hatsushimo, and Nenohi were well away and took no part in the action. The last ships to leave were the transports, each escorted by two destroyers. Sasago Maru was escorted by Asashio and Ōshio; the heavily damaged Sagami Maru was escorted by Michishio and Arashio.

On 19 February, the first Allied wave consisting of the cruisers HNLMS De Ruyter and Java and destroyers USS John D. Ford, Pope, and HNLMS Piet Hein arrived off the southern tip of Bali at 9:30 pm as they proceeded north through the Badung Strait. At 11 pm, the Allies commenced firing as they were spotted by the Japanese. No damage was done in this 10-minute exchange of fire, and the two Dutch cruisers continued through the strait to the northeast, onwards to Soerabaja. Then. Piet Hein, Pope, and John D. Ford came into range and Piet Hein was soon crippled by shell fire. At 11:16 pm, Asashio and Oshio sent nine torpedoes into Piet Hein, which sank at 11:30 pm. Asashio and Oshio then exchanged gunfire with Pope and John D. Ford, forcing the two American destroyers to retire to the southeast instead of following the cruisers to the northeast. In the darkness, Asashio and Oshio mistook each other for enemy ships and fired on each other for several minutes, without any damage.

On 20 February, the second Allied wave consisting of the cruiser HNLMS Tromp and destroyers USS John D. Edwards, Parrott, Pillsbury, and Stewart arrived off the southern tip of Bali at 1:09 am. The destroyers launched torpedoes, which were easily avoided by Oshio and Asashio. The destroyers headed to the northern portion of the strait as Oshio and Asahio confronted Tromp, which was hit several times, causing heavy damage. Oshio 's magazine was hit by a shell that failed to explode, and seven men were killed on her bridge. As the Allied ships departed to the north, they encountered Arashio and Michisio, crippling Michisio, killing 13 and wounding 83. The late-arriving motor torpedo boats failed to have an impact on the battle.

== Aftermath ==
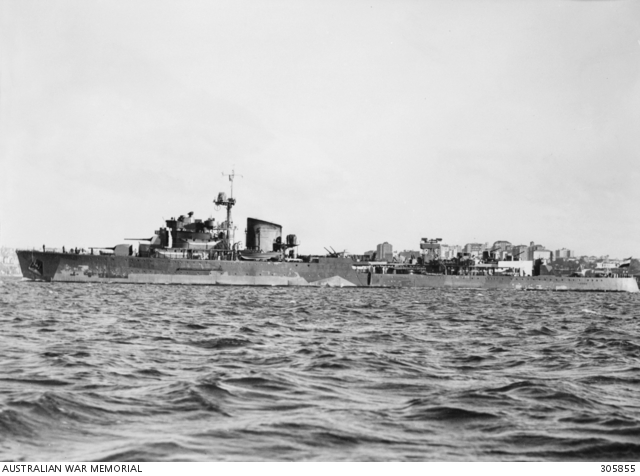
HNLMS Tromp in Sydney after undergoing repairs for damage sustained during the battle

The battle was a significant victory for the Japanese. Lieutenant Commander Gorō Yoshii of Asashio and Commander Kiyoshi Kikkawa of Oshio had shown great bravery and skill. They had driven off a much larger Allied force, sinking the destroyer Piet Hein, damaging the destroyer Stewart, and severely damaging the cruiser Tromp. Meanwhile, the Japanese had sustained little damage themselves, and had protected their transport ships.

The Japanese continued their conquest of the Dutch East Indies with the capture of Timor from 20 to 23 February. The ABDA forces engaged at Badung Strait were decisively defeated in the Battle of the Java Sea on 27 February 1942, in which the Dutch cruisers Java and De Ruyter were sunk and Admiral Doorman was killed. Tromp evaded this fate, for she was withdrawn to Australia to repair damage suffered at Badung Strait. The US destroyer Stewart was sufficiently damaged that she had to be placed in dry dock for repairs in Soerabaia, where she was scuttled to avoid capture by the rapidly advancing Japanese. She was raised, repaired, and put into Japanese service a year later as the patrol vessel PB-102.
