= Japanese destroyer Arashio =

Asashio-class destroyer

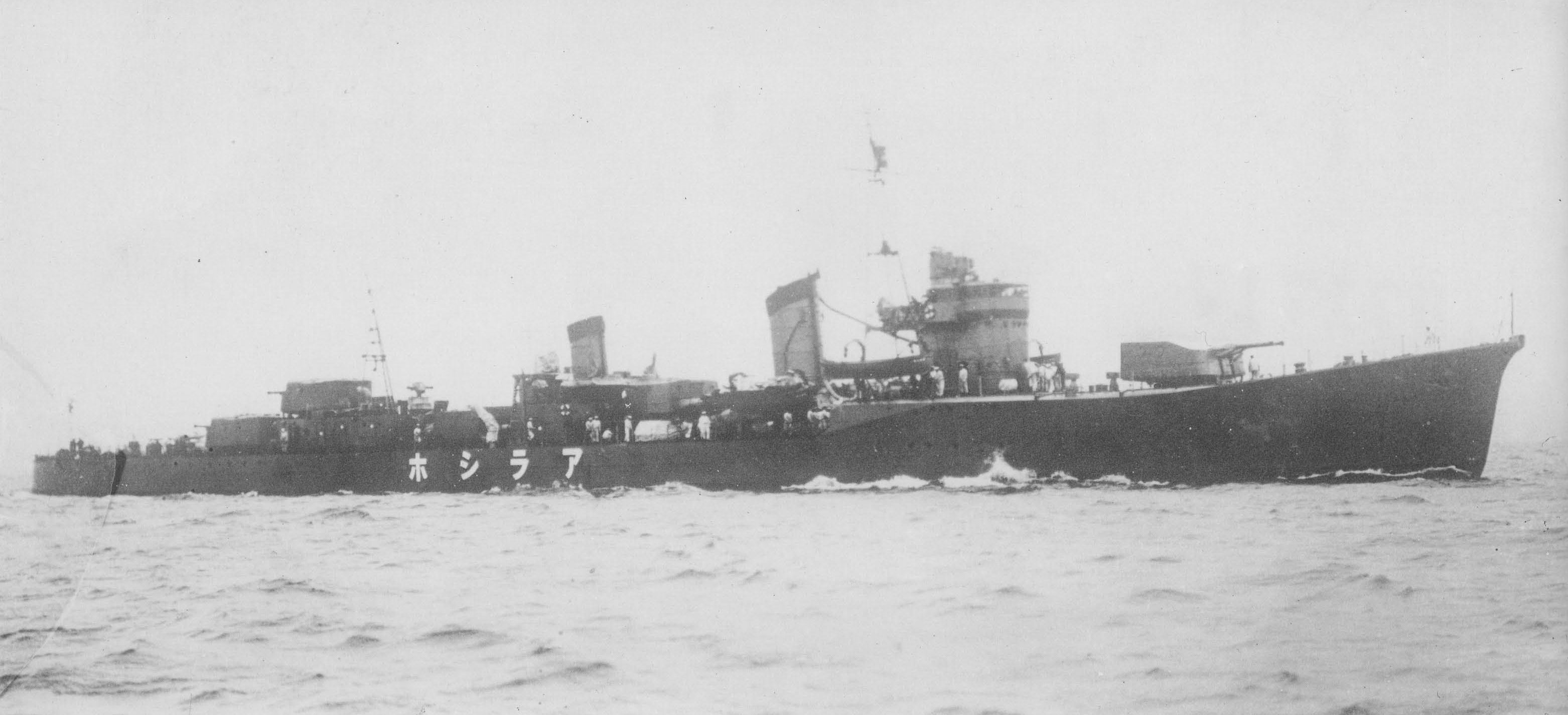
- Arashio on 21 December 1937

History

Empire of Japan
- Name: Arashio
- Ordered: 1934 Maru-2 Program
- Builder: Kawasaki Shipyards
- Laid down: 1 October 1935
- Launched: 26 May 1937
- Commissioned: 30 December 1937
- Stricken: 1 April 1943
- Fate: Sunk in Battle of the Bismarck Sea, 4 March 1943

General characteristics
- Class & type: Asashio-class destroyer
- Displacement: 2,370 long tons (2,408 t)
- Length: 111 m (364 ft) pp; 115 m (377 ft 4 in)waterline; 118.3 m (388 ft 1 in) OA
- Beam: 10.3 m (33 ft 10 in)
- Draft: 3.7 m (12 ft 2 in)
- Propulsion: 2-shaft geared turbine, 3 boilers, 50,000 shp (37,285 kW)
- Speed: 35 knots (40 mph; 65 km/h)
- Range: 5,700 nmi (10,600 km) at 10 kn (19 km/h); 960 nmi (1,780 km) at 34 kn (63 km/h)
- Complement: 200
- Armament: 6 × 12.7 cm/50 Type 3 DP guns; up to 28 × Type 96 AA guns; up to 4 × Type 93 AA guns; 8 × 24 in (610 mm) torpedo tubes; 36 depth charges

Arashio (荒潮, Stormy Tide) was the fourth of ten Asashio-class destroyers built for the Imperial Japanese Navy in the mid-1930s under the Circle Two Supplementary Naval Expansion Program (Maru Ni Keikaku).

== History ==
The Asashio-class destroyers were larger and more capable than the preceding Shiratsuyu class, as Japanese naval architects were no longer constrained by the provisions of the London Naval Treaty. These light cruiser-sized vessels were designed to take advantage of Japan's lead in torpedo technology, and to accompany the Japanese main striking force and in both day and night attacks against the United States Navy as it advanced across the Pacific Ocean, according to Japanese naval strategic projections. Despite being one of the most powerful classes of destroyers in the world at the time of their completion, none survived the Pacific War.

Arashio, built at the Kawasaki Shipyards in Kobe was laid down on 1 October 1935, launched on 26 May 1937 and commissioned on 30 December 1937.

== Operational history ==
At the time of the attack on Pearl Harbor, Arashio, under the command of Lieutenant Commander Hideo Kuboki, was assigned to Destroyer Division 8 (Desdiv 8), and a member of Destroyer Squadron 2 (Desron 2) of the IJN 2nd Fleet, escorting Admiral Nobutake Kondō's Southern Force Main Body out of Mako Guard District as distant cover to the Malaya and Philippines invasion forces in December 1941.

Arashio escorted a Malaya troop convoy from Mako towards Singora, then put into Hong Kong on 5 January 1942. She escorted another troop convoy to Davao, and then accompanied the Ambon invasion force (31 January), the Makassar invasion force (8 February) and the Bali/Lombok invasion force (18 February).

On the night of 19 February 1942, Arashio participated in the Battle of Badoeng Strait, entering the battle late as she was assigned to guard the transport Sagami Maru, and did not see combat. On 8 March, Arashio engaged and sank the Dutch minesweeper Jan van Amstel as it fled the fall of Java, taking the surviving crew prisoner.

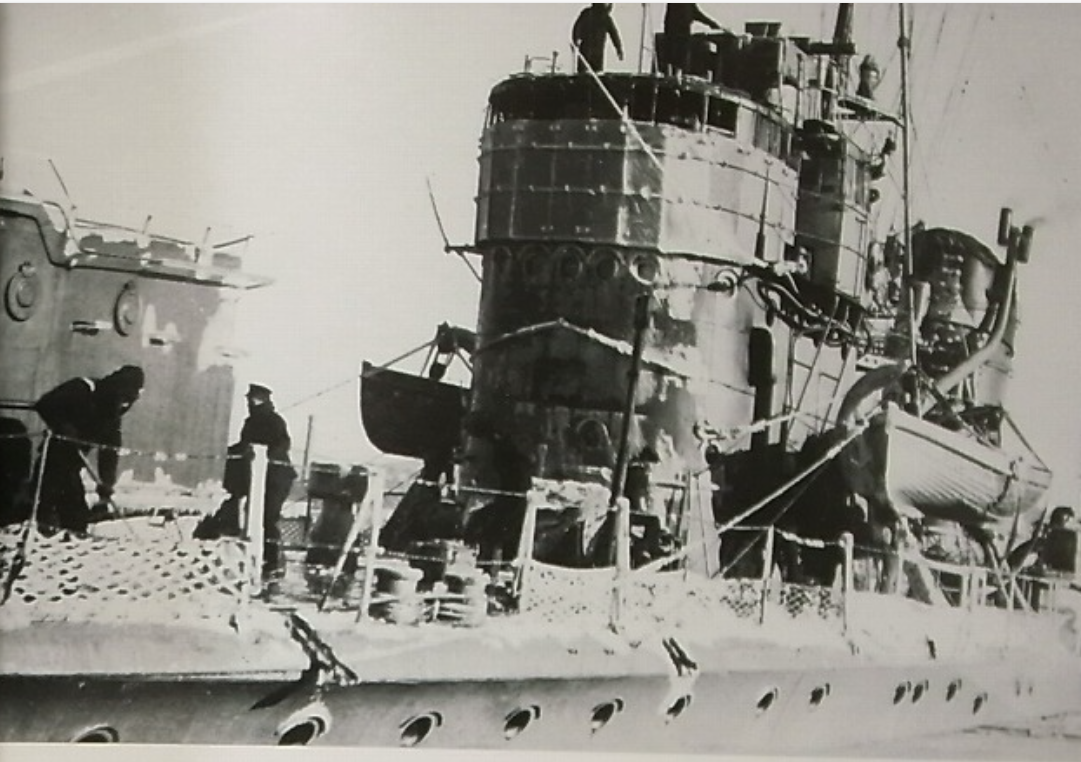
Arashio's bridge and forward turret

Arashio returned to Yokosuka Naval Arsenal in March, and was reassigned to the IJN 2nd Fleet on 10 April. She assisted in the siege of Corregidor in the Philippines from 24 April-18 May, and then returned to Kure. After escorting a convoy to Guam at the end of May, Arashio joined the escort for the Midway Invasion Force under the overall command of Admiral Takeo Kurita during the Battle of Midway. She assisted the destroyer Asashio in rescuing survivors from the stricken cruiser Mikuma and, during the attacks on the cruisers, suffered severe damage from United States Navy aircraft on 6 June, with one direct bomb strike killing 37 crewmen, including several survivors from Mikuma, and wounding many more, including Destroyer Division 8 commander Commander Nobuki Ogawa. In spite of the severe damage she escorted the cruiser Mogami to Truk. At Truk, she underwent emergency repairs by Akashi, which enabled her to return to Sasebo Naval Arsenal by 23 July.

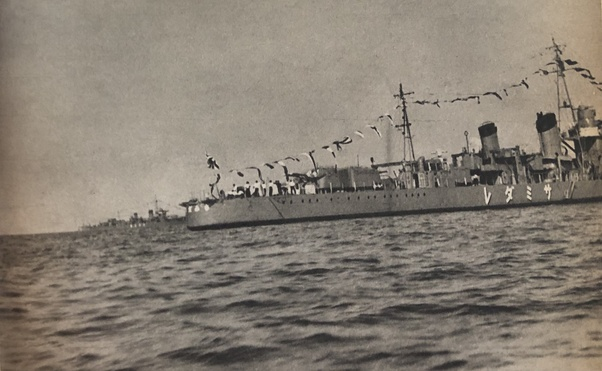
Arashio (background) and Samidare anchored off Yokohama for a fleet review, 11 October 1940

After completion of repairs on 20 October, Arashio was assigned to Rabaul, Arashio was assigned to thirteen “Tokyo Express” transport runs to Buna, Shortland Island, Kolombangara and Guadalcanal and Wewak through mid-February 1943. On 20 February, she rescued the survivors of her torpedoed sister ship Ōshio off of Wewak. Arashio was reassigned to the IJN 8th Fleet on 25 February 1943.

During the Battle of the Bismarck Sea, she was damaged by three bombs from a USAAF B-25C Mitchell bomber named "Chatter Box" on 3 March, which damaged her rudder, causing a collision with troopship Nojima Maru. The destroyer Yukikaze took off her 176 survivors, which did not include her captain (Cdr Hideo Kuboki). Her abandoned hulk was sunk by United States Navy aircraft at position 07°15′S 148°30′E approximately 55 nautical miles (102 km; 63 mi) southeast of Finschhafen, New Guinea She was removed from the navy list on 1 April 1943.
