= USS Stewart (DD-224) =

Clemson-class destroyer

Coordinates: 37.749°N 122.729°W

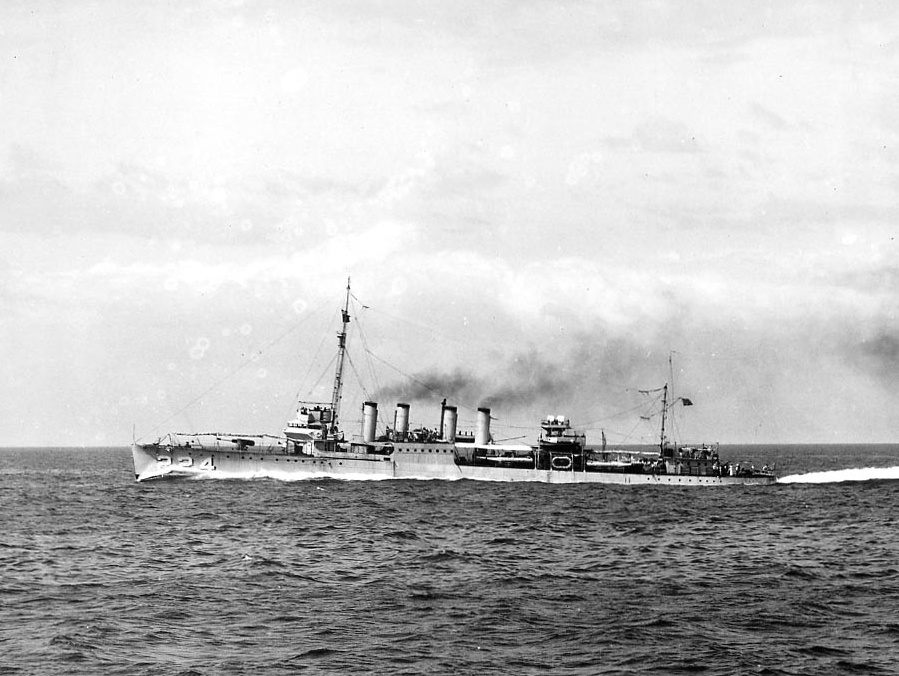
- USS Stewart underway before WWII

History

United States
- Name: USS Stewart
- Namesake: Charles Stewart
- Builder: William Cramp & Sons, Philadelphia
- Laid down: 9 September 1919
- Launched: 4 March 1920
- Commissioned: 15 September 1920
- Stricken: 25 March 1942
- Identification: DD-224
- Honors and awards: 2 battle stars
- Fate: Scuttled at Surabaya, Java, 2 March 1942; later raised and commissioned into Imperial Japanese Navy

Japan
- Name: Patrol boat No.102 (Dai-102-Gō shōkaitei)
- Builder: 102nd Naval Construction Department at Surabaya
- Acquired: February 1943 (raised)
- Commissioned: 20 September 1943
- Fate: Surrendered, August 1945

United States
- Recommissioned: 29 October 1945
- Decommissioned: 23 May 1946
- Stricken: 17 April 1946
- Fate: Sunk as a target, 24 May 1946

General characteristics (as Clemson-class destroyer)
- Class & type: Clemson-class destroyer
- Displacement: 1,215 long tons (1,234 t)
- Length: 314 ft 5 in (95.83 m)
- Beam: 31 ft 9 in (9.68 m)
- Draft: 9 ft 4 in (2.84 m)
- Propulsion: geared turbines
- Speed: 35 knots (65 km/h)
- Complement: 101 officers and enlisted
- Armament: 4 × 4-inch (102 mm), 1 × 3-inch (76 mm), 12 × 21-inch (533 mm) torpedo tubes

General characteristics (as Patrol Boat No. 102)
- Class & type: none
- Displacement: 1,680 long tons (1,707 t) standard
- Length: 98.70 m (323 ft 10 in) overall
- Draft: 3.50 m (11 ft 6 in)
- Propulsion: 2 × Parsons all geared steam turbines; 4 × White-Foster water tube boilers; 2 shafts, 14,000 shp (10,000 kW)
- Speed: 26.0 knots (29.9 mph; 48.2 km/h)
- Endurance: 2,400 nautical miles @ 12 knots (4,400 km @ 22 km/h)
- Complement: 110 (September 1943)
- Sensors & processing systems: 1 × Type 93 active sonar (replaced 1 × Type 3 active sonar in March 1945), 1 × Type 93 hydrophone; (added in September 1944)
- Electronic warfare & decoys: 1 × 22-Gō surface search radar; (added in March 1945); 1 × 13-Gō early warning radar; (added in May 1945)
- Armament: September 1943; 2 × 3-inch (76 mm) guns (Dutch); 2 × 12.7 mm (0.50 in) machine guns (Dutch); 2 × 6.5 mm 11th Year type machine guns; 72 × Type 95 depth charges; June 1945 (final); 2 × 76.2 mm (3.00 in) L/40 3rd Year type AA guns; 14 × Type 96 25 mm (0.98 in) AA guns; 4 × Type 93 13.2 mm (0.52 in) AA guns; 2 × 6.5 mm 11th Year type machine guns; 4 × 450 mm (18 in) Type 2 torpedoes; 72 × Type 2 depth charges

USS Stewart (DD-224) was a Clemson-class destroyer in the United States Navy during World War II. She was the second ship named for Rear Admiral Charles Stewart. Scuttled in port at Surabaya, Java, she was later raised by the Japanese and commissioned as Patrol Boat No. 102. She came back under American control in 1945 after the occupation of Japan.

== Design and construction ==
The Clemson-class was a modified version of the previous Wickes class (itself a faster version of the Caldwell class) with more fuel to increase effective range. Like the Wickes-class ships, the Clemsons had flush decks and four funnels and were ordered in very large numbers to meet the US Navy's need for ships to counter German U-boats as well as to operate with the fleet.

Stewart was 314 ft 4 1/2 in (95.82 m) long overall and 310 ft 0 in (94.49 m) at the waterline, with a beam of 31 ft 8 1/2 in (9.665 m) and a draft of 9 ft 10 in (3.00 m) at full load. Displacement was 1,215 long tons (1,234 t) normal and 1,308 long tons (1,329 t) full load. Four White-Forster water-tube boilers supplied steam at 412 °F (211 °C; 484 K) and 265 psi (1,830 kPa) to two sets of Parsons geared steam turbines, which in turn drove two propeller shafts. The machinery was rated at 25,815 shp (19,250 kW), giving a design speed of 35 kn (40 mph; 65 km/h). The ship had a designed endurance of 2,500 nmi (2,900 mi; 4,600 km) at 20 kn (23 mph; 37 km/h).

Main gun armament consisted of four 4 in (102 mm) /50 caliber guns, supplemented by a single 3 inch (76 mm) 23 caliber anti-aircraft gun, while torpedo armament consisted of twelve 21 inch (533 mm) torpedo tubes. The ship had a crew of 7 officers and 124 enlisted men.

Stewart was one of a batch of 25 Clemson-class destroyers ordered from William Cramp & Sons on 19 December 1917. The destroyer was laid down on 9 September 1919 at Cramp's Philadelphia shipyard and launched on 4 March 1920; sponsored by Mrs. Margaretta Stewart Stevens, granddaughter of Rear Admiral Stewart. Stewart underwent successful sea trials on 8 September 1920, making an average speed of 35.09 kn (40.38 mph; 64.99 km/h) during a four-hour full speed trial. Stewart was delivered to the US Navy on 15 September 1920, and commissioned the same day.

== Service history ==
=== United States Navy ===
==== Between the wars ====
On commissioning, Stewart was assigned to Destroyer Division (DesDiv) 37, a reserve division of Destroyer Squadron (DesRon) 3 of the Atlantic Fleet, transferring to DesDiv 39 in October that year. After a year of coastal operations for reserve squadrons, Stewart joined Destroyer Squadron, Atlantic, on 12 October 1921. On 5 January, Stewart and five more destroyers left Charleston, South Carolina bound for the Caribbean, and on 6 January, Stewart was in a collision with Hopkins, sustaining minor damage. Stewart took part in fleet exercises in the Caribbean from 12 January to 23 February 1922 before departing for Philadelphia. After a period of repairs, during which she was fitted with an echo sounder, Stewart, together with the destroyer tender Black Hawk and the other 12 destroyers of DesRon 15, departed Newport, Rhode Island, on 20 June and proceeded, via the Mediterranean Sea and the Indian Ocean, to the Philippines for service in the Asiatic Fleet. She would not return to the US for 23 years.

Stewart arrived at the Asiatic Fleet's base at Chefoo (now known as Yantai), China, on 26 August, and entered the routine of the Asiatic Fleet, which tended to operate in Chinese waters conducting training exercises from bases at Chefoo and Tsingtao in the summer and in Philippine waters, based at Cavite in the winter and making calls at Chinese ports during the transit in each direction. On 2 September 1923, Stewart left Dalian, China, arriving at Yokosuka, Japan, on 5 September to carry out relief operations (along with most of the destroyers of the Asiatic Fleet) in response to the Great Kantō earthquake which had heavily damaged that city and Tokyo on 30 and 31 August. Stewart left Chinese waters on 25 October 1923, arriving in the Philippines on 28 October, when she was docked down at Olongapo, with repair work continuing at Cavite until 18 November.

In early 1924, Stewart carried out surveying operations using her echo sounder. From 25 May to 16 June 1924, Stewart supported the flight of four US Army Douglas World Cruiser aircraft around the world, operating first in Japan and then at Shanghai.

Between 1924 and 1928, there were outbreaks of anti-foreign disturbances at Shanghai and Canton. Stewart transported marines to Shanghai in January 1925, and during the next years, spent periods augmenting the normal gunboat patrols on the Yangtze River and on the coast near Canton. Further outbreaks of unrest on cites on the Yangtze in September 1926, associated with the Northern Expedition of the Kuomintang led to Stewart being ordered upriver, and on 5 September, she was on passage between Shanghai and Hankou with the destroyer Pope when the two destroyers were fired on from the shore, with two men aboard Stewart slightly wounded. The two American destroyers did not return fire on this occasion. It was reported that all foreign steamers entering or leaving Hankou were being fired on by Kuomintang forces. On 10 September, Stewart was sailing with the gunboat Palos and the minesweeper Pigeon when they came under rifle and artillery fire. This time, Stewart returned fire with rifles, machine guns and one 4-inch shell, which stopped the fire from shore.

On 18 February 1927, Stewart and the destroyer Paul Jones left Manila to search for the Elkton, a US merchant ship that had gone missing after leaving Iloilo on 9 February bound for New York with a cargo of sugar and coconut oil. The search, which was joined by the destroyers William B. Preston and Sicard on 20 February, was abandoned on 24 February, with nothing being found. Stewart was at Shanghai on 24 March 1927 when National Revolutionary Army troops attacked foreigners in the Nanking incident. For the next few months, the destroyer remained on the Yangtze, being based at Wuhu, Nanking, Shanghai, and Chenglin. On 27 March Stewart was on the way to Wuhu, when she was fired on, wounding three crewmen. Stewart was in collision with the merchant ship SS Luen Ho while on passage down the Yangtze on 5 November 1927, with the destroyer suffering a dented side. She remained in Chinese waters until 14 January 1928.

Stewart was off the coast of China, near the Matsu Islands, when the Japanese launched an air and sea attack on Shanghai, the January 28 incident in late January 1932. The destroyer was ordered to Swatow to protect American citizens, remaining there from 1 to 3 February, before proceeding to Amoy, where she remained from 9 to 24 February, before arriving at Shanghai on 26 February 1932. On 23 March, Stewart collided with the British sloop HMS Sandwich and two Chinese barges. While Sandwich and one of the barges received little damage, the other barge lost a length of anchor chain, some of which ended up wound around Stewart's port propeller, which was badly damaged and required replacement. Stewart remained at Shanghai until 12 May 1932.

In January 1934, Stewart started an overhaul and repair period at Cavite alongside the Black Hawk, with work including inspecting and repairing the ship's port turbines. A fire broke out aboard on 10 February 1934 which was quickly extinguished. The overhaul continued into March, with Stewart demonstrating a speed of 32 kn (37 mph; 59 km/h) during post repair sea trials. On 14 July 1934, Stewart dragged her anchor while at Chefoo, colliding with the Chinese warship Chuyku, but only sustained minor damage.

After full-scale war between Japan and China broke out in 1937 Stewart continued to spend much of her time at Chinese ports and was stationed at Tsingtao and Shanghai from 15 August to 17 October 1937. On 1 October, Stewart was at Shanghai when Chinese aircraft carried out several air raids against Japanese ships and troops, with several bombs dropped near Stewart. After a mail run to Yokohama, Japan between 17 and 30 October, she returned to Chinese waters, leaving Shanghai on 18 December carrying newreel footage of the Japanese sinking of the American gunboat Panay. Stewart was again stationed at Chinese ports from 21 February to 21 March 1938. On 30 July 1938, Stewart and the destroyers Pope and Parrott left Manila to search for the missing Pan American Airways flying boat Hawaii Clipper with the search continuing unsuccessfully until 6 August. Stewart returned to Chinese waters from 3 June to 4 September 1939. On the latter date, after the outbreak of war in Europe, she was ordered south for patrol duties in the Philippines, which she continued until entering the Cavite Navy Yard for overhaul on 5 April 1940. Upon leaving the yard on 1 June, Stewart acted as plane guard vessel for seaplanes flying between Guam and the Philippines and then made a final tour of Chinese Yellow Sea ports from 7 July to 23 September 1940. During 1941, she remained in the Philippines as the international situation worsened, carrying out patrols in Manila Bay and the southern Philippines.

==== World War II ====
On 27 November 1941, (Note: 24 November according to Klar) Admiral Thomas C. Hart, commander of the Asiatic Fleet, after receiving a war warning from the Chief of Naval Operations, ordered the major warships of the Asiatic Fleet to disperse to ports in the southern Philippines and the Dutch East Indies to minimise the potential for the fleet to be knocked out by Japanese air attack in the event of war, and to ease potential link up with Dutch forces. Stewart, along with the cruiser Marblehead and the destroyers Barker, Bulmer, Paul Jones and Parrott, was ordered to Tarakan in Borneo, arriving there on 29 November. Stewart was still at Tarakan when news of the outbreak of hostilities with Japan arrived on 8 December.

During the final weeks of 1941, she escorted naval auxiliaries from the Philippines to Port Darwin, Australia. On 9 January 1942 Stewart was one of five destroyers in an escort composed of the cruisers Boise and Marblehead, with the other destroyers Bulmer, Pope, Parrott and Barker departing from Darwin to Surabaya escorting the transport Bloemfontein. That transport had been part of the Pensacola Convoy and had left Brisbane 30 December 1941 with Army reinforcements composed of the 26th Field Artillery Brigade and Headquarters Battery, the 1st Battalion, 131st Field Artillery and supplies from that convoy destined for Java.

On 30 January, Stewart joined Marblehead and sortied with her from Bunda Roads on 4 February to intercept Japanese forces at the south entrance to the Macassar Strait. However, Marblehead was badly damaged by air attacks during the day, and Stewart escorted her back to the base at Tjilatjap, Java.

Stewart joined Admiral Karel Doorman's striking force under the American-British-Dutch-Australian Command on 14 February for an attack on Japanese forces advancing along the northern coast of Sumatra. During the approach, Stewart had to back her engines to avoid a Dutch destroyer ahead of her which had run aground on a reef in Stolze Strait, and, on the following day, 15 February, she survived numerous air attacks in the Bangka Strait. Although they damaged no Allied ships, the air attacks convinced Doorman that further advance without air cover would be foolhardy, and the Allied force retired. Stewart was detached on 16 February to fuel at Ratai Bay in Sumatra.

Doorman's forces were scattered when the Japanese landed on Bali on 19 February, and he threw his ships against the enemy in three groups on the night of 19 and 20 February in the Battle of Badung Strait. Stewart was lead ship in the second group and, in several brief but furious night engagements, came under extremely accurate fire from Japanese destroyers. Her boats were shot away, her torpedo racks and galley were hit, and a crippling shot hit the destroyer aft below her water line, opening her seams and flooding the steering engine room. However, the steering engine continued to operate under 2 feet (610 mm) of water; and the destroyer was able to maintain her station in column and return to Surabaya the next morning.

==== Scuttling ====
Stewart, as the most severely damaged ship, was the first to enter the floating drydock at Surabaya on 22 February. However, she was inadequately supported in the dock, and as the dock rose, the ship fell off the keel blocks onto her side in 12 feet (3.7 m) of water, bending her propeller shafts and causing further hull damage. With the port under enemy air attack and in danger of falling to the enemy, the ship could not be repaired. Responsibility for the destruction of the ship was given to naval authorities ashore, and Stewart's last crew members left the embattled port on the afternoon of 22 February.

Subsequently, demolition charges were set off within the ship, a Japanese bomb hit amidships further damaged her, and before the port was evacuated on 2 March, the drydock containing her was scuttled. Her name was struck from the Navy list on 25 March 1942 and was soon assigned to a new destroyer escort, USS Stewart (DE-238).

=== Imperial Japanese Navy ===
Later in the war, American pilots began reporting an American warship operating far within enemy waters. The ship had a Japanese trunked funnel but the lines of her four-piper hull were unmistakable. After almost a year under water, Stewart had been raised by the Japanese in February 1943 and commissioned into the Imperial Japanese Navy on 20 September 1943 as Patrol Boat No. 102. She was armed with two 3 inch guns and operated with the Japanese Southwest Area Fleet on escort duty. On 23 August 1944, under command of Lieutenant Tomoyoshi Yoshima, she operated in consort with the anti-submarine vessel CD-22, which sank Harder with all hands, using depth charges, although PB-102 was not directly involved in this action. In November 1944, PB-102 arrived at Kure for repairs. There her antiaircraft battery was augmented, and she was given a light tripod foremast. She then sailed for the Southwest Pacific, but the American reconquest of the Philippines blocked her way. On 28 April 1945, still under control of the Southwest Area Fleet, she was bombed and damaged by United States Army aircraft at Mokpo, Korea. She was transferred on 30 April to the control of the Kure Navy District, and in August 1945, was found by American occupation forces laid up in Hiro Bay near Kure.

=== Return to United States Navy and final destruction ===
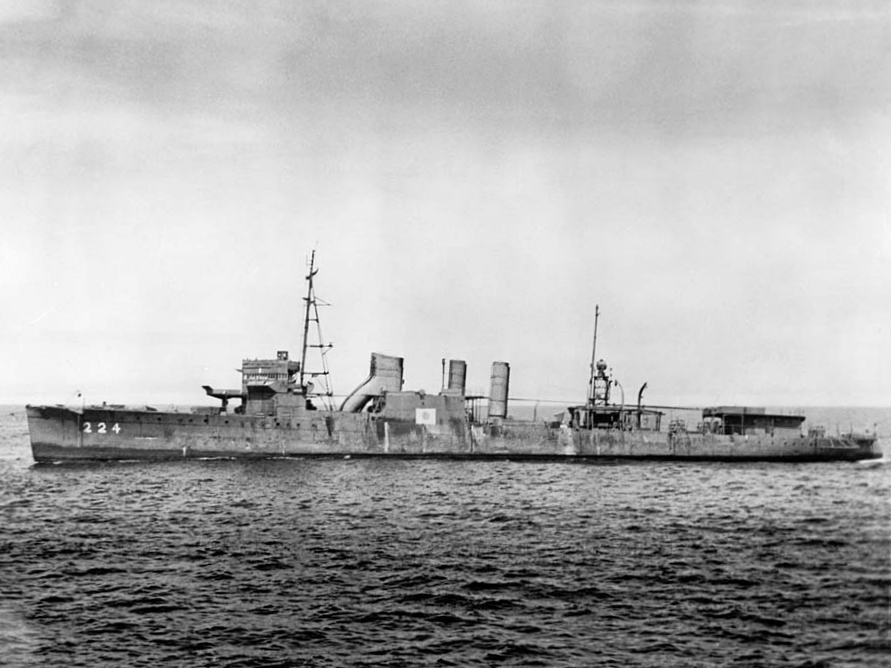
DD-224 after recapture from the Japanese Navy and recommissioning in the USN

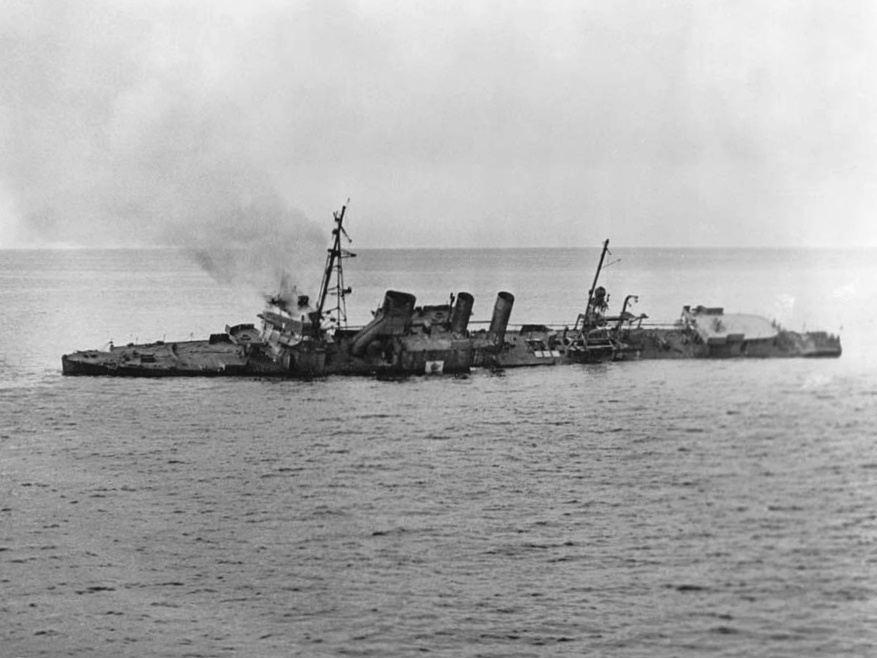
DD-224 sinking after use as a target ship

In an emotional ceremony on 29 October 1945, the ship was recommissioned in the United States Navy at Kure. Although officially called simply DD-224, she was nicknamed by her crew "RAMP-224," standing for "Recovered Allied Military Personnel". On the trip home, her engines gave out near Guam, and she arrived at San Francisco, California in early March 1946 at the end of a towline. DD-224 was again struck from the Navy list on 17 April 1946, decommissioned on 23 May 1946, and sunk a day later off San Francisco as a target for aircraft.

Five Navy F6F Hellcat fighters hit her with 18 rockets and thousands of rounds of 50 calibre ammunition but she refused to go down despite the damage. She was finally sunk by USS PC-799 which finished her off with twelve 40-mm and 17 three-inch shells fired from a range of 300 yards.

=== Wreck found ===
In August 2024, the wreck, remarkably intact, was found by autonomous drones, resting 3,500 feet beneath the ocean surface off the coast of San Francisco. A statement read, "This level of preservation is exceptional for a vessel of its age and makes it potentially one of the best-preserved examples of a US Navy ‘fourstacker’ destroyer known to exist."

== Awards ==
- China Service Medal
- American Defense Service Medal with "FLEET" clasp
- Asiatic-Pacific Campaign Medal with two battle stars
- World War II Victory Medal
- Navy Occupation Medal with "ASIA" clasp
- Philippine Defense Medal
