= Japanese battleship Fusō =

Battleship of the Imperial Japanese navy

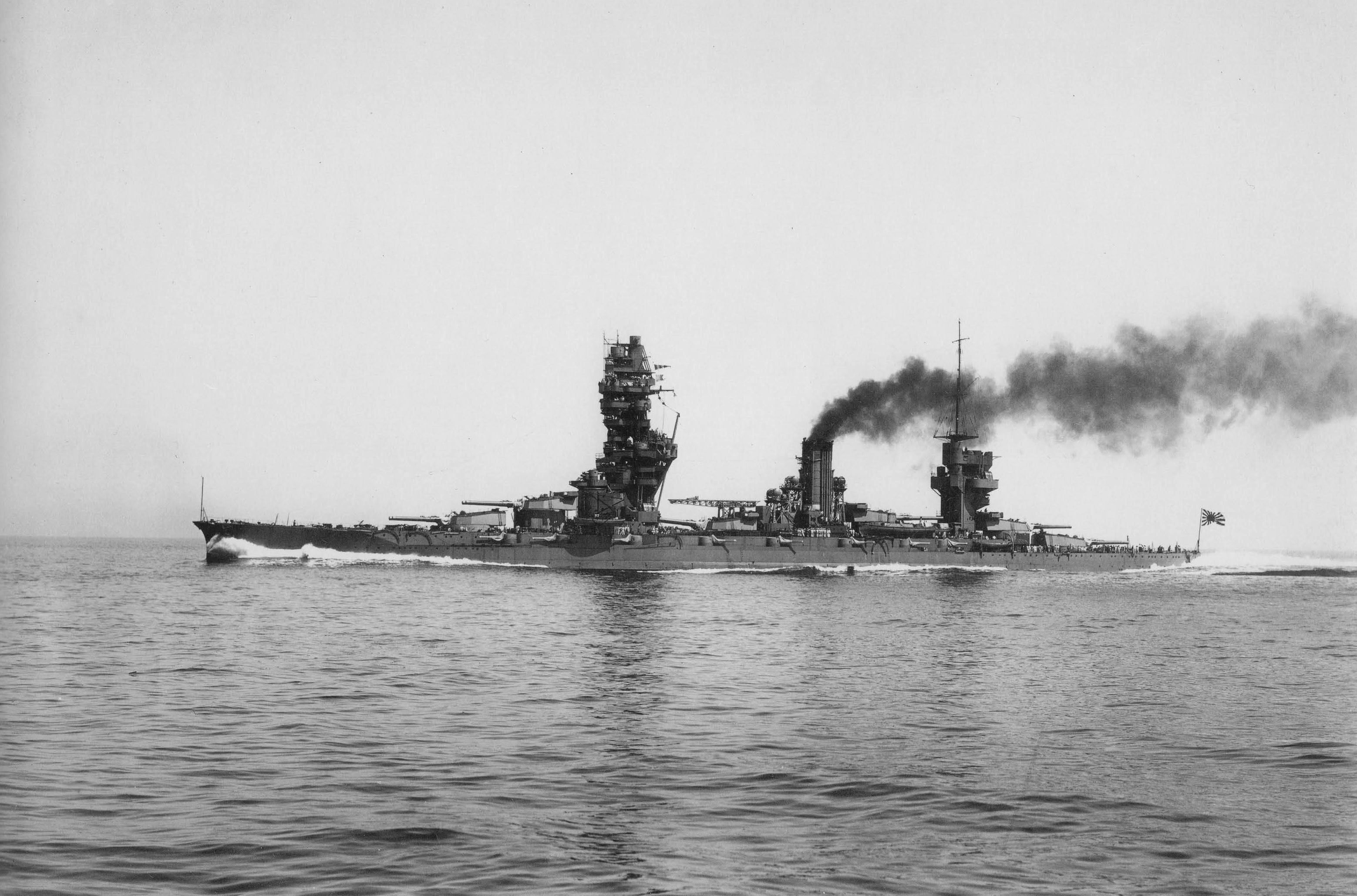
- Fusō undergoing trials on 10 May 1933 following her first modernization

History

Empire of Japan
- Name: Fusō (Japanese: 扶桑)
- Namesake: Fusang, a classical name for Japan
- Builder: Kure Naval Arsenal
- Laid down: 11 March 1912
- Launched: 28 March 1914
- Commissioned: 8 November 1915
- Stricken: 31 August 1945
- Fate: Sunk during the Battle of Surigao Strait, 25 October 1944

General characteristics (as built)
- Class & type: Fusō-class battleship
- Displacement: 29,330 long tons (29,801 t) (standard); 35,900 long tons (36,476 t) (full load)
- Length: 192.1 m (630 ft 3 in) (pp); 202.7 m (665 ft) (overall)
- Beam: 28.7 m (94 ft 2 in)
- Draft: 8.7 m (28 ft 7 in)
- Installed power: 24 × Miyahara water-tube boilers; 40,000 shp (30,000 kW)
- Propulsion: 4 × shafts; 2 × steam turbine sets
- Speed: 23 knots (43 km/h; 26 mph)
- Range: 8,000 nmi (15,000 km; 9,200 mi) at 14 knots (26 km/h; 16 mph)
- Complement: 1,198
- Armament: 6 × twin 356 mm (14 in) guns; 16 × single 152 mm (6 in) guns; 6 × 533 mm (21 in) torpedo tubes
- Armor: Waterline belt 229–305 mm (9–12 in); Deck: 32–51 mm (1.3–2.0 in); Gun turrets: 229–279 mm (9–11 in); Barbettes: 203–305 mm (8–12 in); Conning tower: 351 mm (13.8 in)

General characteristics (1944)
- Displacement: 34,700 long tons (35,300 t)
- Length: 212.75 m (698 ft) (overall)
- Beam: 33.1 m (108 ft 7 in)
- Draft: 9.7 m (31 ft 10 in)
- Installed power: 6 × water-tube boilers; 75,000 shp (56,000 kW)
- Propulsion: 4 × steam turbines
- Speed: 24.5 knots (45.4 km/h; 28.2 mph)
- Range: 11,800 nmi (21,900 km; 13,600 mi) at 16 knots (30 km/h; 18 mph)
- Complement: approximately 1,900
- Sensors & processing systems: 1 × Type 21 air search radar; 2 × Type 13 early warning radar; 2 × Type 22 surface search radar
- Armament: 6 × twin 356 mm (14 in) guns; 14 × single 152 mm (6 in) guns; 4 × twin 127 mm (5 in) DP guns; 8 × triple, 6 × twin, 23 × single 25 mm (1 in) AA guns
- Armor: Deck: 51–152 mm (2–6 in)
- Aircraft carried: 3 × floatplanes
- Aviation facilities: 1 × catapult

Fusō (Japanese: 扶桑; a classical name for Japan) was the lead ship of the two Fusō-class dreadnought battleships built for the Imperial Japanese Navy. Launched in 1914 and commissioned in 1915, she initially patrolled off the coast of China, playing no part in World War I. In 1923, she assisted survivors of the Great Kantō earthquake.

Fusō was modernized in 1930–1935 and again in 1937–1941, with improvements to her armor and propulsion machinery and a rebuilt superstructure in the pagoda mast style. Nonetheless, she was still hampered by slow speed and outclassed by newer Japanese battleships at the beginning of World War II, and played auxiliary roles for most of the war.

Fusō was part of Vice-Admiral Shōji Nishimura's Southern Force at the Battle of Leyte Gulf. She was sunk in the early hours of 25 October 1944 by torpedoes and naval gunfire during the Battle of Surigao Strait. Some reports claimed Fusō broke in half, and that both halves remained afloat and burning for an hour; according to survivors' accounts, however, the ship sank after 40 minutes of flooding and caught fire when her fuel bunkers spilled open. Of the few dozen crewmen who escaped, only 10 survived to return to Japan.

== Description ==
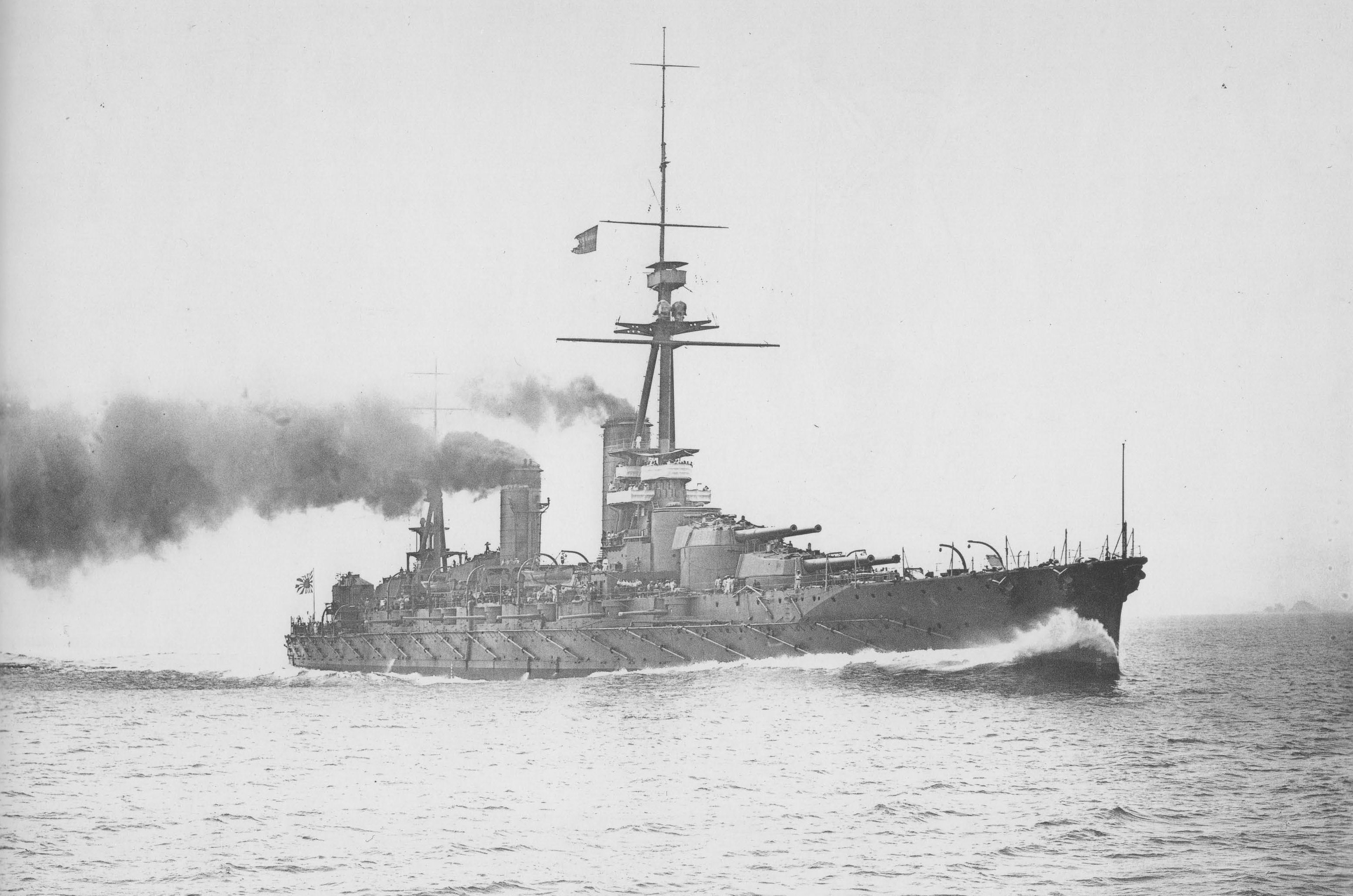
Fusō on her sea trials, 24 August 1915

The ship had a length of 192.1 meters (630 ft 3 in) between perpendiculars and 202.7 meters (665 ft) overall. She had a beam of 28.7 meters (94 ft 2 in) and a draft of 8.7 meters (29 ft). Fusō displaced 29,326 long tons (29,797 t) at standard load and 35,900 long tons (36,476 t) at full load. Her crew consisted of 1,198 officers and enlisted men in 1915 and 1,396 in 1935. During World War II, the crew probably totalled around 1,800–1,900 men.

During the ship's first modernization during 1930–1933, her forward superstructure was enlarged with multiple platforms added to her tripod foremast. Her rear superstructure was rebuilt to accommodate mounts for 127-millimeter (5 in) anti-aircraft (AA) guns and additional fire-control directors. Fusō was also given torpedo bulges to improve her underwater protection and to compensate for the weight of the additional armor and equipment. During the second phase of her first reconstruction in 1934–1935, Fusō's torpedo bulge was enlarged and her stern was lengthened by 7.62 meters (25.0 ft). These changes increased her overall length to 212.75 m (698.0 ft), her beam to 33.1 m (108 ft 7 in) and her draft to 9.69 meters (31 ft 9 in). Her displacement increased by nearly 4,000 long tons (4,100 t) to 39,154 long tons (39,782 t) at deep load.

=== Propulsion ===
The ship had two sets of Brown-Curtis direct-drive steam turbines, each of which drove two propeller shafts. The turbines were designed to produce a total of 40,000 shaft horsepower (30,000 kW), using steam provided by 24 Miyahara-type water-tube boilers, each of which consumed a mixture of coal and oil. Fusō had a stowage capacity of 4,000 long tons (4,064 t) of coal and 1,000 long tons (1,016 t) of fuel oil, giving her a range of 8,000 nautical miles (15,000 km; 9,200 mi) at a speed of 14 knots (26 km/h; 16 mph). The ship exceeded her design speed of 22.5 knots (41.7 km/h; 25.9 mph) during her sea trials, reaching 23 knots (43 km/h; 26 mph) at 46,500 shp (34,700 kW).

During her first modernization, the Miyahara boilers were replaced by six new Kampon oil-fired boilers fitted in the former aft boiler room, and the forward funnel was removed. The Brown-Curtis turbines were replaced by four geared Kanpon turbines with a designed output of 75,000 shp (56,000 kW). During her 1933 trials, Fusō reached a top speed of 24.7 knots (45.7 km/h; 28.4 mph) from 76,889 shp (57,336 kW). The fuel storage of the ship was increased to a total of 5,100 long tons (5,182 t) of fuel oil that gave her a range of 11,800 nautical miles (21,900 km; 13,600 mi) at a speed of 16 knots (30 km/h; 18 mph).

=== Armament ===
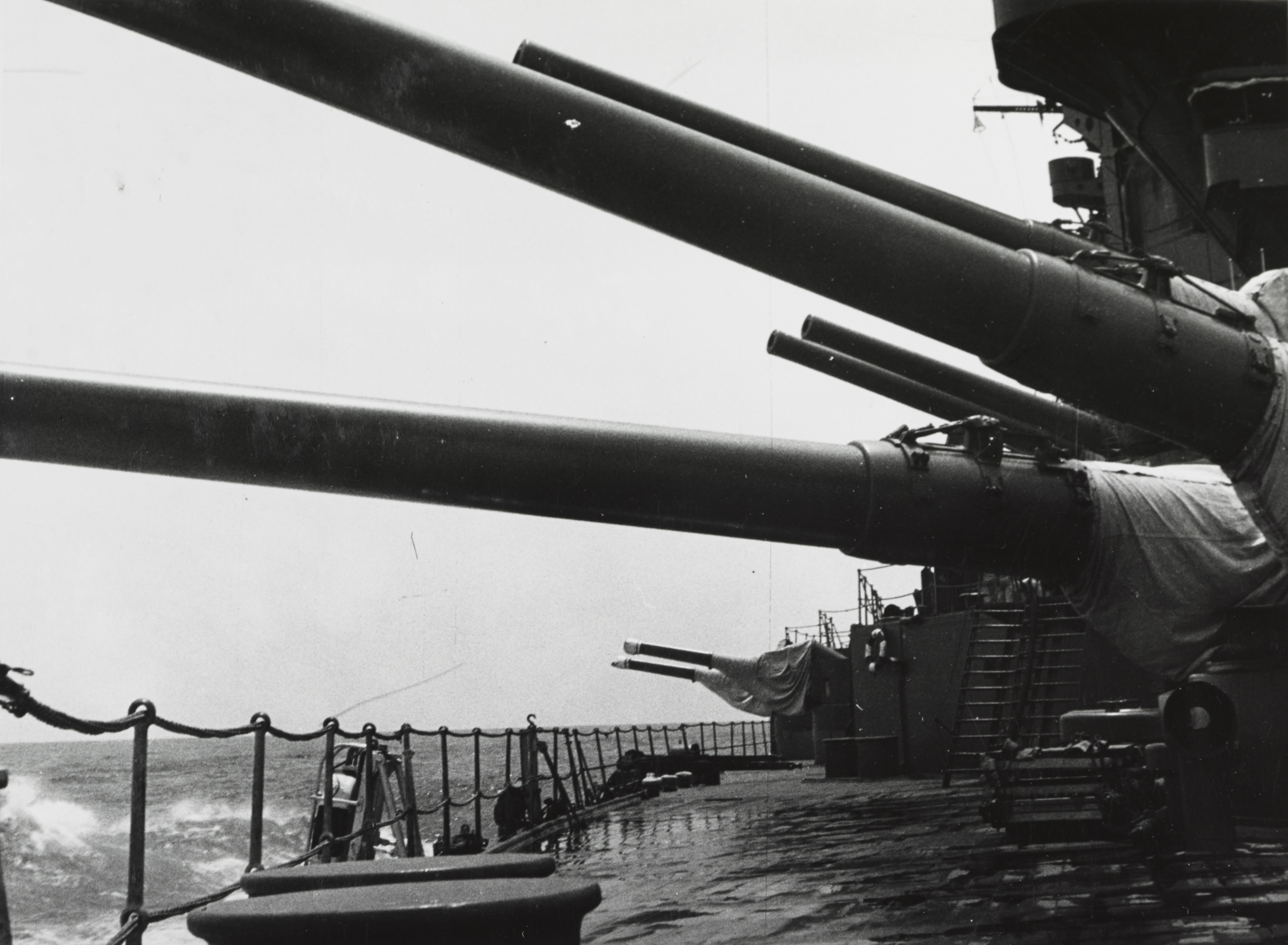
Aft view of Fusō's main and secondary battery

The twelve 45-caliber 14-inch guns of Fusō were mounted in six twin-gun turrets, numbered one through six from front to rear, each with an elevation range of −5 to +30 degrees. The turrets were arranged in an uncommon 2-1-1-2 style with superfiring pairs of turrets fore and aft; the middle turrets were not superfiring, and had a funnel between them. The main guns and their turrets were modernized during the ship's 1930 reconstruction; the elevation of the main guns was increased to +43 degrees, increasing their maximum range from 27,800 to 35,450 yards (25,420 to 32,420 m). Initially, the guns could fire at a rate of 1.5 rounds per minute, and this was also improved during her first modernization. The orientation of Turret No. 3 was reversed during the modernization; it now faced forward.

Originally, Fusō was fitted with a secondary armament of sixteen 50-caliber six-inch 41st Year Type guns mounted in casemates on the upper sides of the hull. The gun had a maximum range of 22,970 yards (21,000 m) and fired at a rate of up to six shots per minute. She was fitted with five 40-caliber three-inch (76 mm) AA guns in 1918. The high-angle guns were in single mounts on both sides of the forward superstructure and both sides of the second funnel, as well as on the port side of the aft superstructure. These guns had a maximum elevation of +75 degrees, and could fire a 5.99-kilogram (13.2 lb) shell at a rate of 13 to 20 rounds per minute to a maximum height of 7,200 meters (23,600 ft). The ship was also fitted with six submerged 533-millimeter (21.0 in) torpedo tubes, three on each broadside.

During the first phase of Fusō's modernization of the early 1930s, all five three-inch guns were removed and replaced with eight 40-caliber 127-millimeter dual-purpose guns, fitted on both sides of the fore and aft superstructures in four twin-gun mounts. When firing at surface targets, the guns had a range of 14,700 meters (16,100 yd); they had a maximum ceiling of 9,440 meters (30,970 ft) at their maximum elevation of +90 degrees. Their maximum rate of fire was 14 rounds a minute, but their sustained rate of fire was around eight rounds per minute. At this time, the ship was also provided with four quadruple mounts for the license-built Type 93 13.2 mm machine guns, two on the pagoda mast and one on each side of the funnel. The maximum range of these guns was 6,500 meters (7,100 yd), but the effective range against aircraft was only 1,000 meters (1,100 yd). The cyclic rate was adjustable between 425 and 475 rounds per minute, but the need to change 30-round magazines reduced the effective rate to 250 rounds per minute.

The improvements made during the first reconstruction increased Fusō's draft by 1 meter (3 ft 3 in), soaking the two foremost six-inch guns, so they were removed during the first phase of the ship's second modernization in 1937 and 1938. During this same phase, the Type 93 13.2-millimeter (0.52 in) machine guns were replaced by eight 25 mm Type 96 light AA guns in twin-gun mounts. Four of these mounts were fitted on the forward superstructure, one on each side of the funnel and two on the rear superstructure. This was the standard Japanese light AA gun during World War II, but it suffered from severe design shortcomings that rendered it a largely ineffective weapon. According to historian Mark Stille, the twin and triple mounts "lacked sufficient speed in train or elevation; the gun sights were unable to handle fast targets; the gun exhibited excessive vibration; the magazine was too small, and, finally, the gun produced excessive muzzle blast". The configuration of the AA guns varied significantly; in July 1943, 17 single and two twin-mounts were added for a total of 37. In July 1944, the ship was fitted with additional AA guns: 23 single, six twin and eight triple-mounts, for a total of 95 in her final configuration. These 25-millimeter (0.98 in) guns had an effective range of 1,500–3,000 meters (1,600–3,300 yd), and an effective ceiling of 5,500 meters (18,000 ft) at an elevation of +85 degrees. The maximum effective rate of fire was only between 110 and 120 rounds per minute because of the frequent need to change the fifteen-round magazines.

=== Armor ===
The ship's waterline armor belt was 305 to 229 millimeters (12 to 9 in) thick; below it was a strake of 102 mm (4 in) armor. The deck armor ranged in thickness from 32 to 51 mm (1.3 to 2.0 in). The turrets were protected with an armor thickness of 279.4 mm (11.0 in) on the face, 228.6 mm (9.0 in) on the sides, and 114.5 mm (4.51 in) on the roof. The barbettes of the turrets were protected by armor 305 mm thick, while the casemates of the 152 mm guns were protected by 152 mm armor plates. The sides of the conning tower were 351 millimeters (13.8 in) thick. The vessel contained 737 watertight compartments (574 underneath the armor deck, 163 above) to preserve buoyancy in the event of battle damage.

During her first reconstruction Fusō's armor was substantially upgraded. The deck armor was increased to a maximum thickness of 114 mm (4.5 in). A longitudinal bulkhead of 76 mm (3.0 in) of high-tensile steel was added to improve underwater protection.

=== Aircraft ===
Fusō was briefly fitted with an aircraft flying-off platform on Turret No. 2 in 1924. During the first phase of her first modernization, a catapult was fitted on the roof of Turret No. 3 and the ship was equipped to operate three floatplanes, although no hangar was provided. The initial Nakajima E4N2 biplanes were replaced by Nakajima E8N2 biplanes in 1938. Fusō's ability to operate her aircraft was greatly improved during the second phase of her second modernization in 1940–41 when the aircraft handling equipment was moved to the stern and a new catapult was installed. Mitsubishi F1M biplanes replaced the E8Ns from 1942 on.

=== Fire control and sensors ===
When completed in 1915, Fusō had two 3.5-meter (11 ft 6 in) and two 1.5-meter (4 ft 11 in) rangefinders in her forward superstructure, a 4.5-meter (14 ft 9 in) rangefinder on the roof of Turret No. 2, and 4.5-meter rangefinders in Turrets 3, 4, and 5. In late 1917 a fire-control director was installed on a platform on the foremast. The 4.5-meter rangefinders were replaced by 8-meter (26 ft 3 in) instruments in 1923. During the ship's first modernization, four directors for the 12.7 mm AA guns were added, one each on each side of the fore and aft superstructures, and an eight-meter rangefinder was installed at the top of the pagoda mast. This was replaced by a 10-meter (32 ft 10 in) rangefinder during 1938. At this same time, the two 3.5-meter rangefinders on the forward superstructure were replaced by directors for the 25 mm AA guns. Additional 25 mm directors were installed on platforms on each side of the funnel.

While in drydock in July 1943, Type 21 air search radar was installed on the roof of the 10-meter rangefinder at the top of the pagoda mast. In August 1944, two Type 22 surface search radar units were installed on the pagoda mast and two Type 13 early warning radar units were fitted on the funnel. Fusō was the only Japanese battleship to mount radar on her funnel.

== Construction and service ==
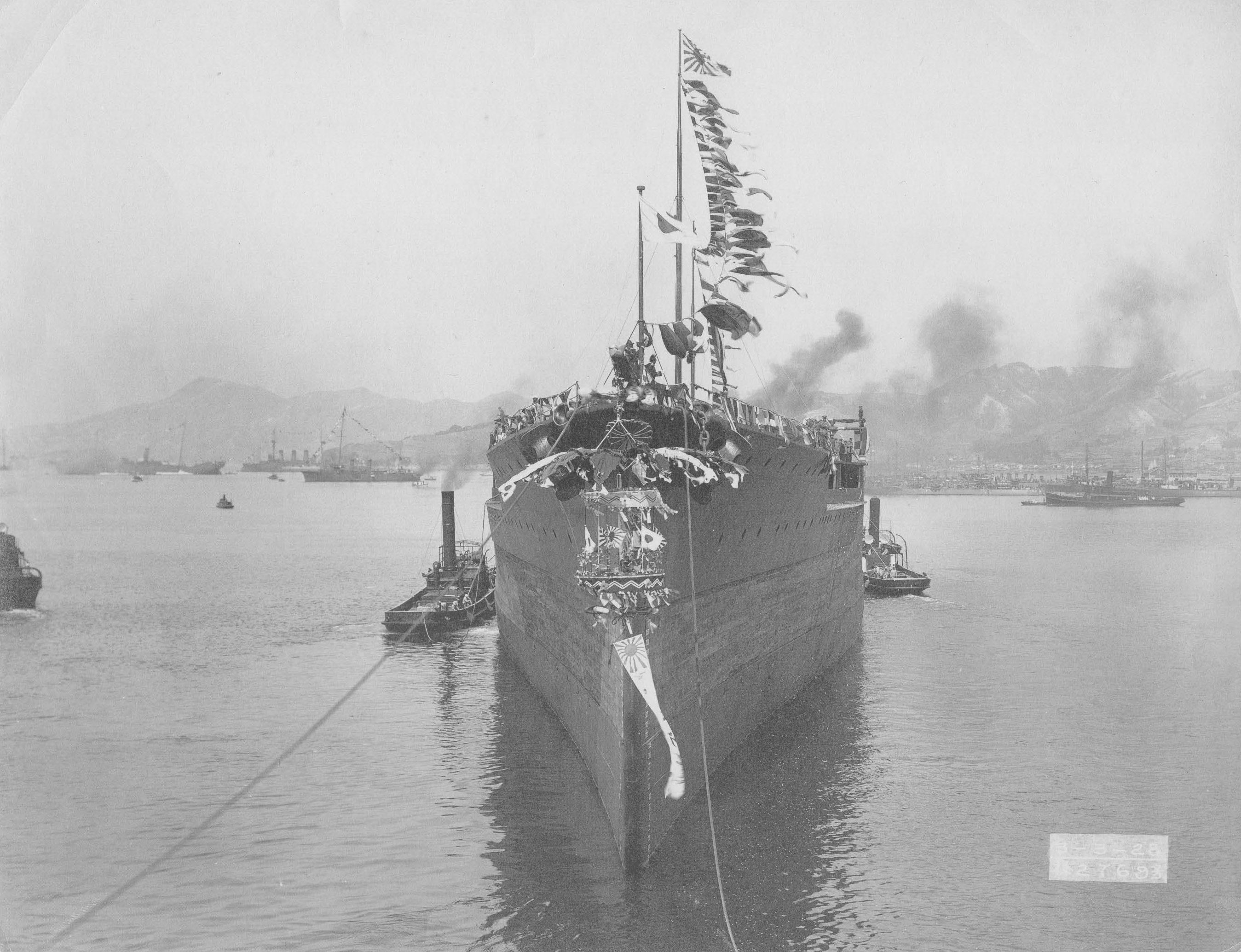
Launch of Fusō, 28 March 1914

Given a classical name for Japan, Fusō was laid down at the Kure Naval Arsenal on 11 March 1912 and launched on 28 March 1914. She was commissioned on 8 November 1915 and assigned to the 1st Division, (Note: Skulski and Preston use Squadron while Hackett uses BatDiv, presumably Battleship Division.) of the 1st Fleet on 13 December under the command of Captain Kōzō Satō. The ship did not take part in any combat during World War I, as there were no longer any forces of the Central Powers in Asia by the time she was completed; she patrolled off the coast of China during that time. The ship served as the flagship of the 1st Division during 1917 and 1918. During the ship's period in reserve in 1918, five 76.2 mm anti-aircraft guns were installed. She aided survivors of the Great Kantō earthquake between 9 and 22 September 1923. Captain Mitsumasa Yonai assumed command on 1 July 1924 and was relieved on 1 November by Captain Sankichi Takahashi. In the 1920s, Fusō conducted training off the coast of China and was often placed in reserve.

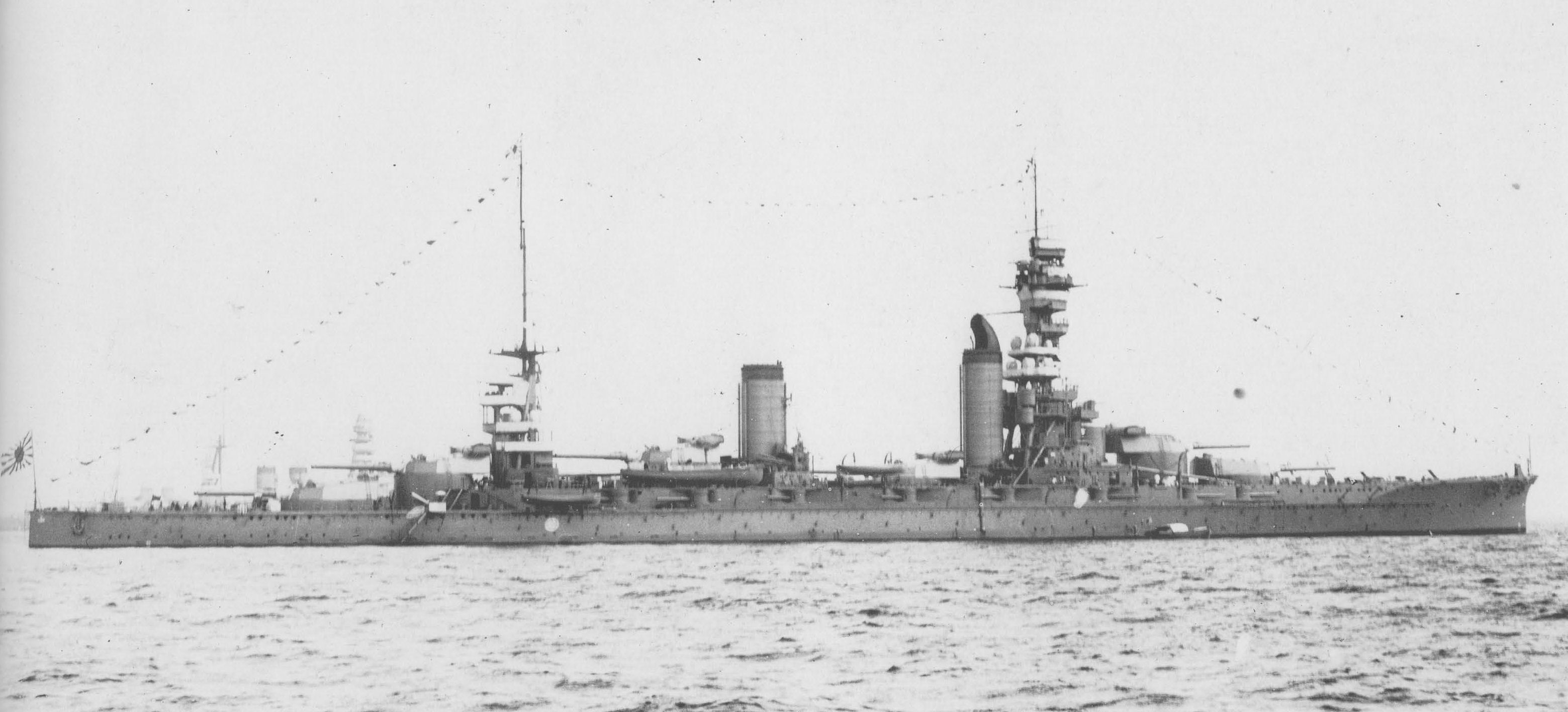
Fusō at anchor in Yokohama, 3 February 1928

The first phase of the ship's first modernization began on 12 April 1930 at the Yokosuka Naval Arsenal; machinery was replaced, armor was reinforced, and torpedo bulges were fitted. Fusō arrived on 26 September 1932 at Kure Naval Arsenal, where her armament was upgraded and her torpedo tubes were removed. Her sea trials began on 12 May 1933, and the second phase of her modernization began less than a year later. The ship's stern was lengthened and work was completed in March 1935. Captain Jinichi Kusaka was assigned command from November 1935 to December 1936. After sporadic use for training for the next two years, Fusō was assigned as a training ship in 1936 and 1937.

Fusō began the first phase of her second modernization on 26 February 1937, and Captain Hiroaki Abe assumed command on 1 December. He was relieved by Captain Ruitaro Fujita on 1 April 1938, the day after this phase of her modernization was completed. The ship was again assigned to the 1st Division of the 1st Fleet on 15 November. She briefly operated in Chinese waters in early 1939 before the second phase of her second modernization began on 12 December 1940. This was completed on 10 April 1941, and Fusō was assigned to the 2nd Division of the 1st Fleet. Captain Mitsuo Kinoshita assumed command on 15 September, when the division consisted of the two Fusō-class and the two Ise-class battleships.

=== World War II ===
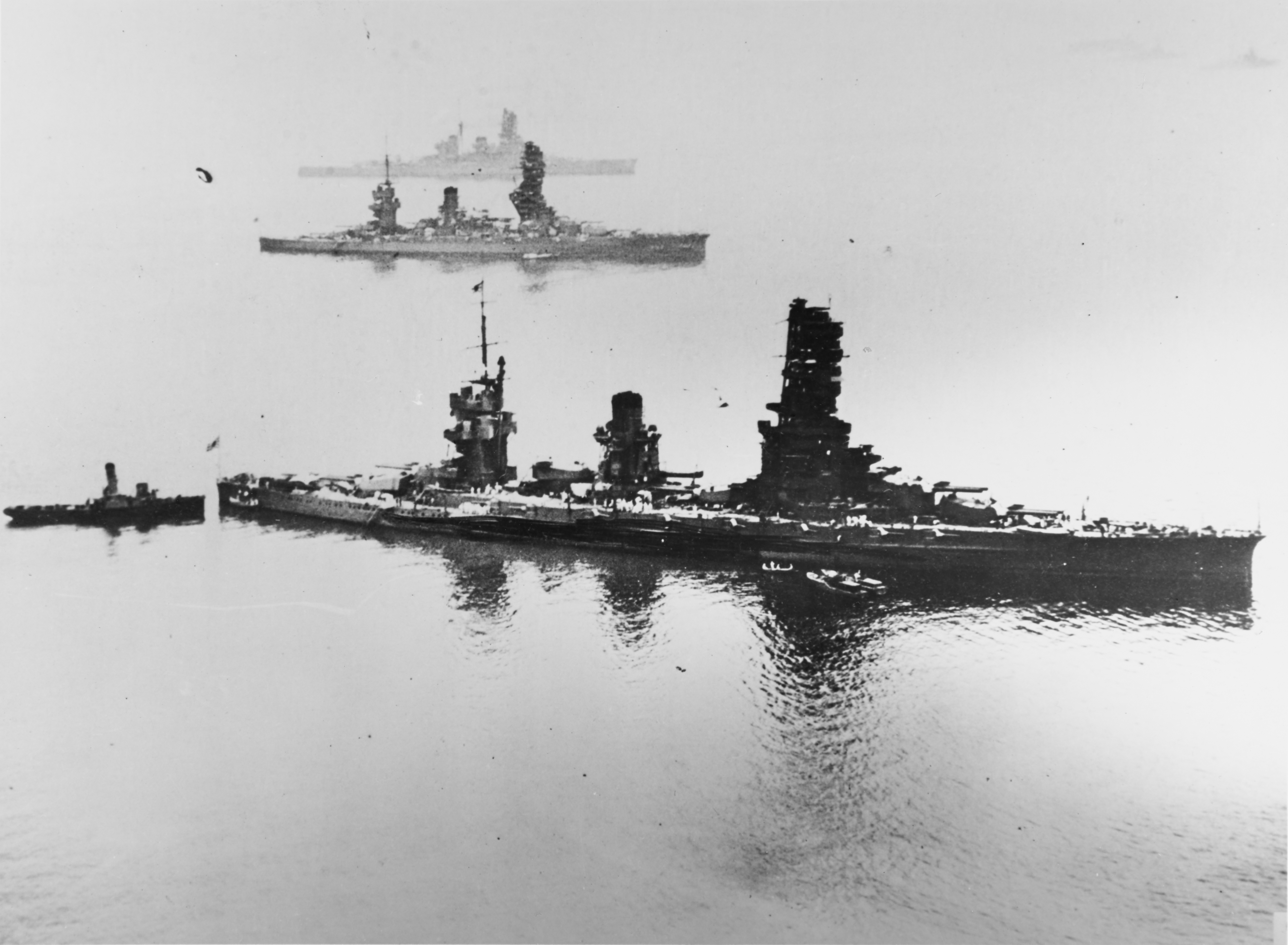
Fusō (middle), with Yamashiro (foreground) and Haruna (more distant), Tokyo Bay, 1930s

On 10 April 1941, Fusō was assigned to the 2nd Division of the 1st Fleet. When the war started for Japan on 8 December, (Note: Japan Standard Time is 19 hours ahead of Hawaiian Standard Time, so in Japan, the attack on Pearl Harbor happened on 8 December.) the division, reinforced by the battleships Nagato and Mutsu and the light carrier Hōshō, sortied from Hashirajima to the Bonin Islands as distant support for the 1st Air Fleet attacking Pearl Harbor, and returned six days later. On 21 February 1942, the ship returned to the shipyard at Kure to replace her gun barrels, departing on 25 February. Together with the rest of the 2nd Battleship Division, she pursued but did not catch the American carrier force that had launched the Doolittle Raid on 18 April 1942.

Fusō and the rest of the 2nd Battleship Division set sail on 28 May 1942 with the Aleutian Support Group at the same time that most of the Imperial Fleet began an attack on Midway Island (Operation MI). Commanded by Vice-Admiral Shirō Takasu, the division was composed of Japan's four oldest battleships, including Fusō, accompanied by two light cruisers, 12 destroyers, and two oilers. Official records do not show the division as part of the larger Midway operation, known as Operation AL; they were to accompany the fleet under Admiral Isoroku Yamamoto, but were only to provide support to the Aleutian task force if needed.

On 14 June, Fusō returned to Yokosuka and arrived back at Hashirajima on 24 June. In an effort to replace the aircraft carriers lost at the Battle of Midway, the navy made plans to convert the two Fusō-class ships to hybrid battleship-carriers, but the two Ise-class battleships were chosen instead. The ship was assigned to the Imperial Japanese Naval Academy at Etajima, Hiroshima, for use as a training ship between 15 November 1942 and 15 January 1943. Captain Keizō Komura assumed command on 5 December, and was relieved by Captain Nobumichi Tsuruoka on 1 June the next year. Seven days later, Fusō rescued 353 survivors from the battleship Mutsu when that ship exploded at Hashirajima.

Between 18 and 24 July 1943, the ship was at the Kure drydock for fitting of radar and additional 25 mm AA guns. Fusō sailed from the Inland Sea on 18 August for Truk Naval Base, carrying supplies, and arrived five days later. The Japanese had intercepted American radio traffic that suggested an attack on Wake Island, and on 17 October, Fusō and the bulk of the 1st Fleet sailed for Eniwetok to be in a position to intercept any such attack. The fleet arrived on the 19th, departed four days later, and arrived back at Truk on 26 October.

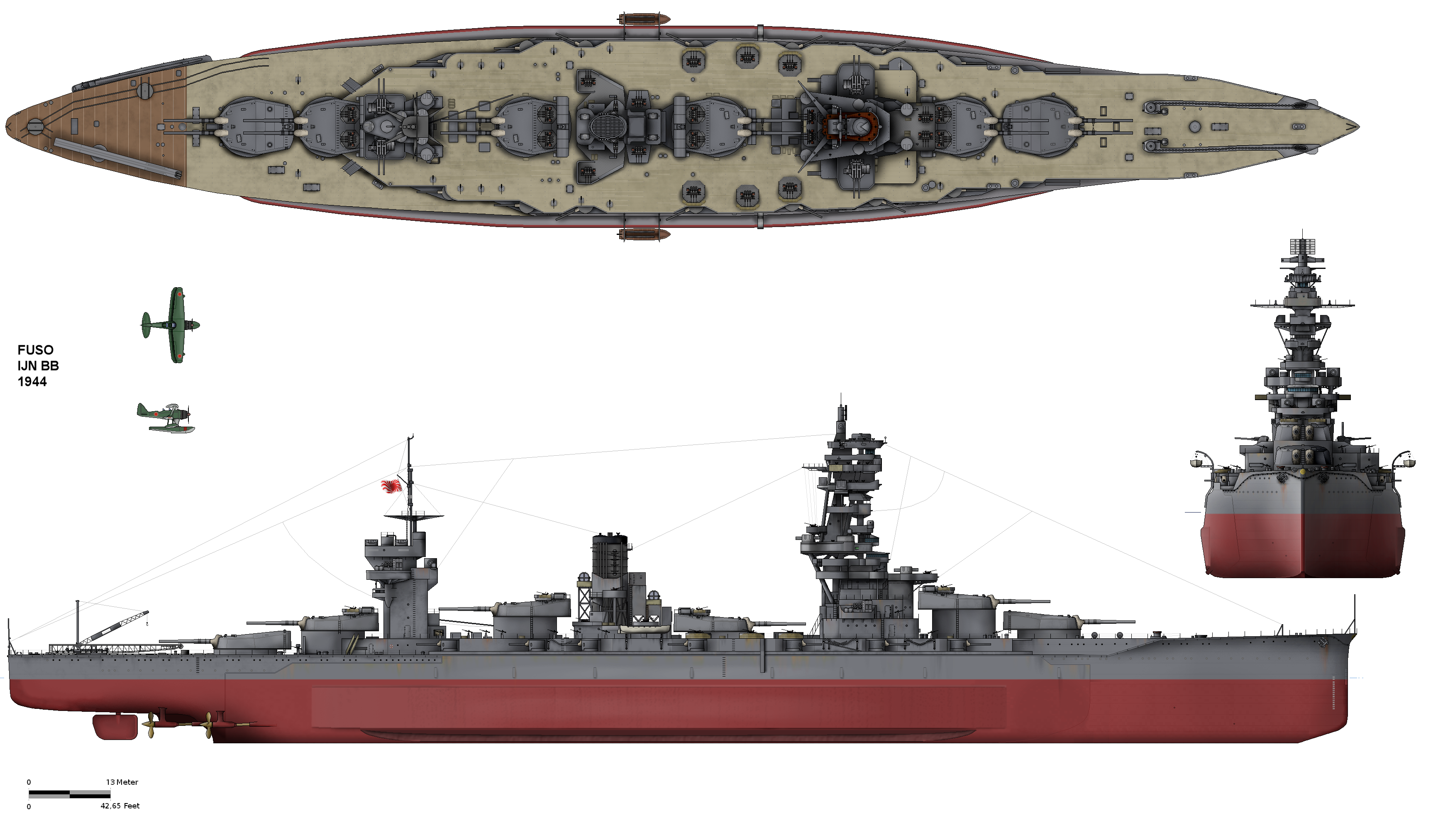
Line drawing of Fusō as she appeared in October 1944

On 1 February 1944, Fusō departed Truk with Nagato to avoid an American air raid, and arrived at Palau on 4 February. They left on 16 February to escape another air raid. The ships arrived on 21 February at Lingga Island, and Fusō was employed there as a training ship. A week later, Captain Masami Ban relieved Tsuruoka. The ship was refitted at Singapore between 13 and 27 April, and returned to Lingga. She was transferred to Tawi-Tawi on 11 May and provided cover for the convoy that failed to reinforce Biak Island at the end of the month. Fusō transferred to Tarakan Island off Borneo to refuel in early July before returning to Japan and escaping an attack by the submarine Pomfret. In early August at Kure, she was refitted with additional radars and light AA guns. Fusō and her sister ship were transferred to Battleship Division 2 of the 2nd Fleet on 10 September, and Fusō became the flagship of the division under the command of Vice-Admiral Shōji Nishimura on 23 September. They departed Kure on 23 September for Lingga, escaping an attack by the submarine Plaice the next day, and arrived on 4 October, where Nishimura transferred his flag to Yamashiro. The ships then transferred to Brunei to refuel in preparation for Operation Shō-Gō, the attempt to destroy the American fleet conducting the invasion of Leyte.

==== Battle of Surigao Strait ====
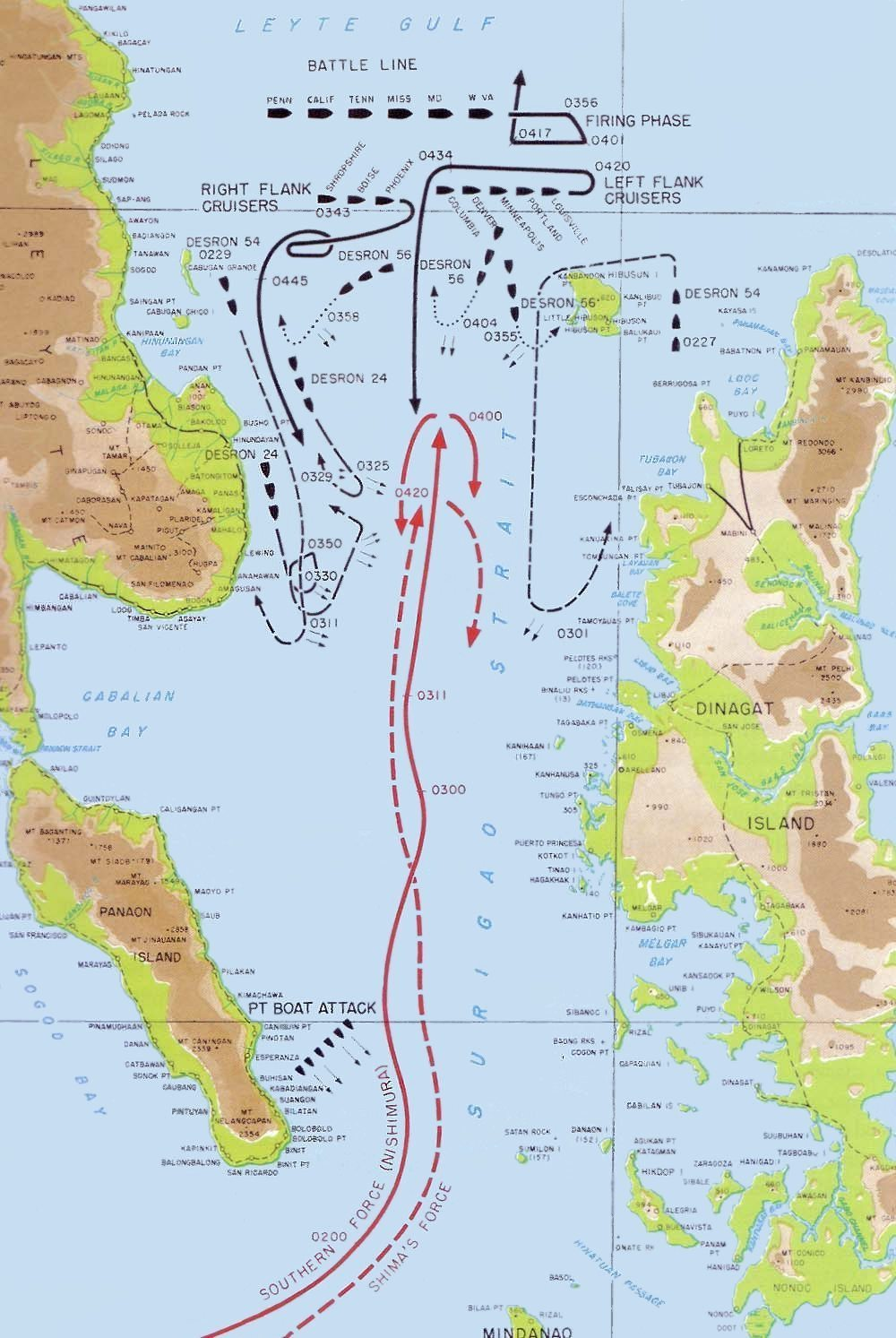
The Battle of Surigao Strait

Commanded by Rear Admiral Masami Ban, Fusō left Brunei at 15:30 on 22 October 1944 as part of Nishimura's Southern Force, heading east into the Sulu Sea and then northeast into the Mindanao Sea.

At 09:08 on 24 October, Fusō, Yamashiro, and the heavy cruiser Mogami spotted a group of 27 planes, including Grumman TBF Avenger torpedo bombers and Curtiss SB2C Helldiver dive bombers escorted by Grumman F6F Hellcat fighters from the carrier Enterprise. A bomb from one of them destroyed the catapult and both floatplanes. Another bomb hit the ship near Turret No. 2 and penetrated the decks, killing everyone in No. 1 secondary battery; the ship began to list 2 degrees to starboard. Early the next morning, Fusō opened fire around 01:05 after a shape was spotted off the port bow; it turned out to be Mogami; Fusō's fire killed three sailors in that ship's sick bay.

Intending to join Vice-Admiral Takeo Kurita's fleet in Leyte Gulf, Nishimura's flotilla passed west of Mindanao Island into Surigao Strait, where it met a large force of battleships and cruisers lying in wait. The Battle of Surigao Strait became the southernmost action in the Battle of Leyte Gulf.

Nishimura's ships managed to repel waves of attacks from PT boats, but then was subjected to devastating torpedo attacks from the American destroyers deployed on both sides of their axis of advance. Before Fusō could reach the main American battle line, one or two torpedoes, possibly fired by the destroyer Melvin, hit Fusō amidships on the starboard side at 03:09 on 25 October; she listed to starboard, slowed down, and fell out of formation. Some Japanese and American eyewitnesses later claimed Fusō broke in half, and that both halves remained afloat and burning for an hour, but they specifically mentioned only the size of the fire on the water, and not any details of the ship. Historian John Toland agreed in 1970 that Fusō had broken in two, but according to historian Anthony Tully in 2009:

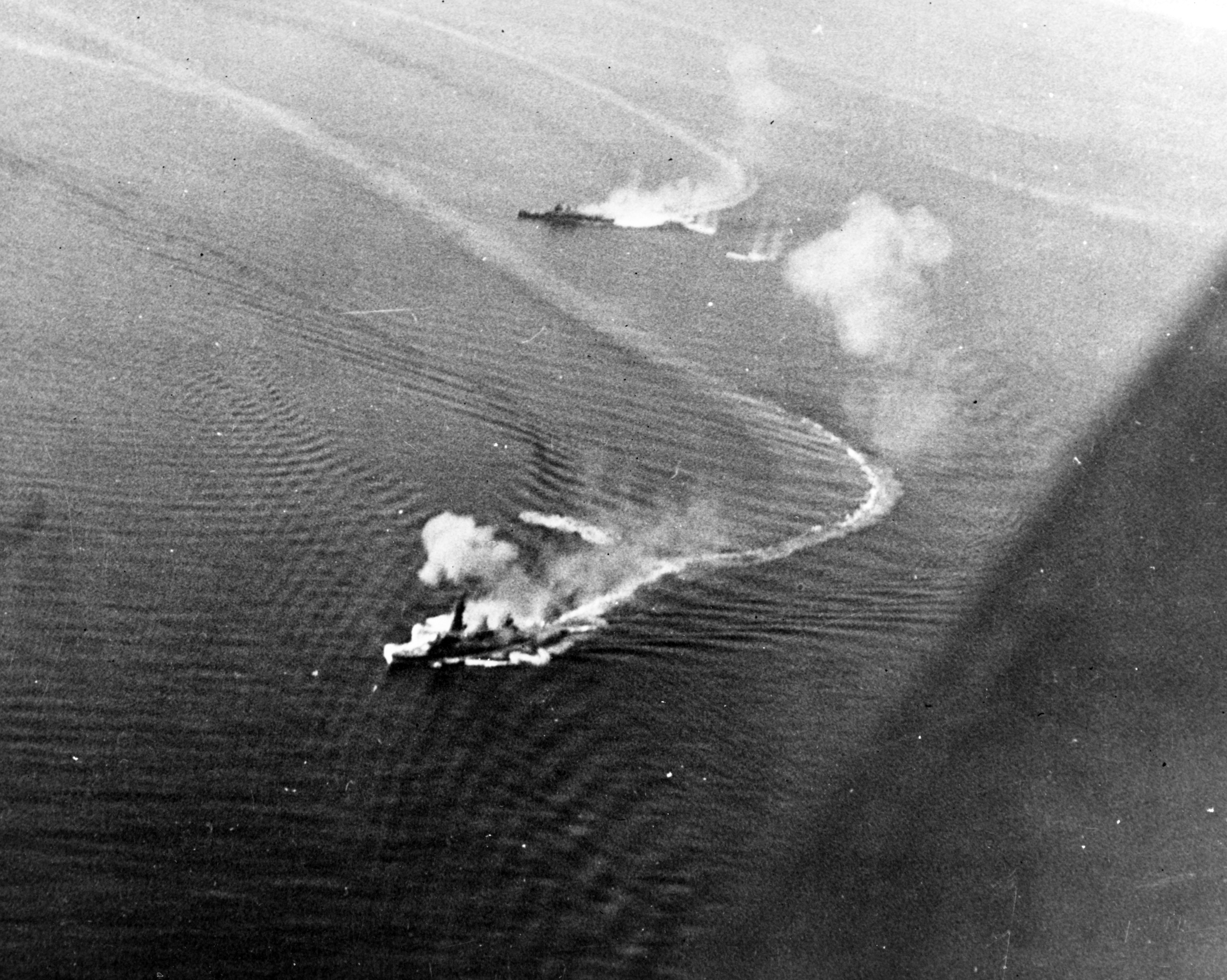
Fusō and Mogami under air attack during the Battle of Surigao Strait

[Survivors' accounts] and the USS Hutchins report are describing a sinking and event at odds with the conventional record—one that seems far removed from the spectacle of the invariably alleged huge magazine explosion and blossom of light at 0338 that supposedly blew the battleship in half! ... Fuso was torpedoed, and as a result of progressive flooding, upended and capsized within forty minutes.

Fusō sank between 03:38 and 03:50, releasing a large quantity of oil which ignited on the surface as she went down; only a few dozen men survived the rapid sinking and subsequent oil fire. There is evidence that some of these were rescued by the destroyer Asagumo, which was itself sunk a short time later; it is also possible that some who escaped the sinking reached Leyte only to be killed by Filipinos, as is known to have happened to survivors from other Japanese warships sunk in the Battle of Surigao Strait. Ten crew members are known to have survived, all of whom returned to Japan. The total number of casualties is estimated at 1,620 sailors.

Fusō was removed from the navy list on 31 August 1945.

==== Wreck ====
RV Petrel discovered the wreck of Fusō on 25 November 2017. The ship lies upside down in 185 m (607 ft) of water and is in one piece on the seabed, with the hull broken amidships from the impact with the bottom. The pagoda mast broke off during the sinking and is some distance away from the wreck.
