= Nihan =

Nihan (Persian: نهان) is a Turkish female given name of Persian origin that means secret, hidden. People named Nihan include:

- Nihan Anaz (born 1979), Turkish basketball player
- Nihan Güneyligil (born 1982), Turkish volleyball player
- Nihan Kantarcı (born 1982), Turkish sport shooter
- Nihan Kaya, Turkish novelist
- Nihan Su, Turkish women's football manager and former footballer

== See also ==
- Camp Nihan
