= Kayacan =

Kayacan is both a Turkish masculine given name and surname, composed of the elements "Kaya" and "Can", meaning "strong as a rock". Notable people with the name include:

== Surname ==
- Buse Kayacan (born 1992), Turkish volleyball player
- Fuat Hüsnü Kayacan (1879–1963), Turkish football player, manager, and referee
- Hamit Hüsnü Kayacan (1868–1952), Turkish intellectual and sports executive, brother of Fuat Hüsnü
- Kemal Kayacan (1915–1992), Turkish admiral
- Müfit Kayacan (born 1959), Turkish actor and theatre director

== Given name ==
- Kayacan Erdoğan (born 1988), Turkish football player
