= Japanese ship Kaya =

Several ships have been named Kaya (榧 / かや, "torreya nucifera"):

- Japanese destroyer Kaya (1919), a Momi-class destroyer of the Imperial Japanese Navy
- Japanese destroyer Kaya (1944), a Matsu-class destroyer of the Imperial Japanese Navy during World War II
- JDS Kaya (PF-288), a Kusu-class patrol frigate of the Japan Maritime Self-Defense Force, formerly USS San Pedro (PF-37)

== See also ==
- Kaya (disambiguation)
