= Japanese destroyer Maki (1944) =

Japanese Matsu-class escort destroyer

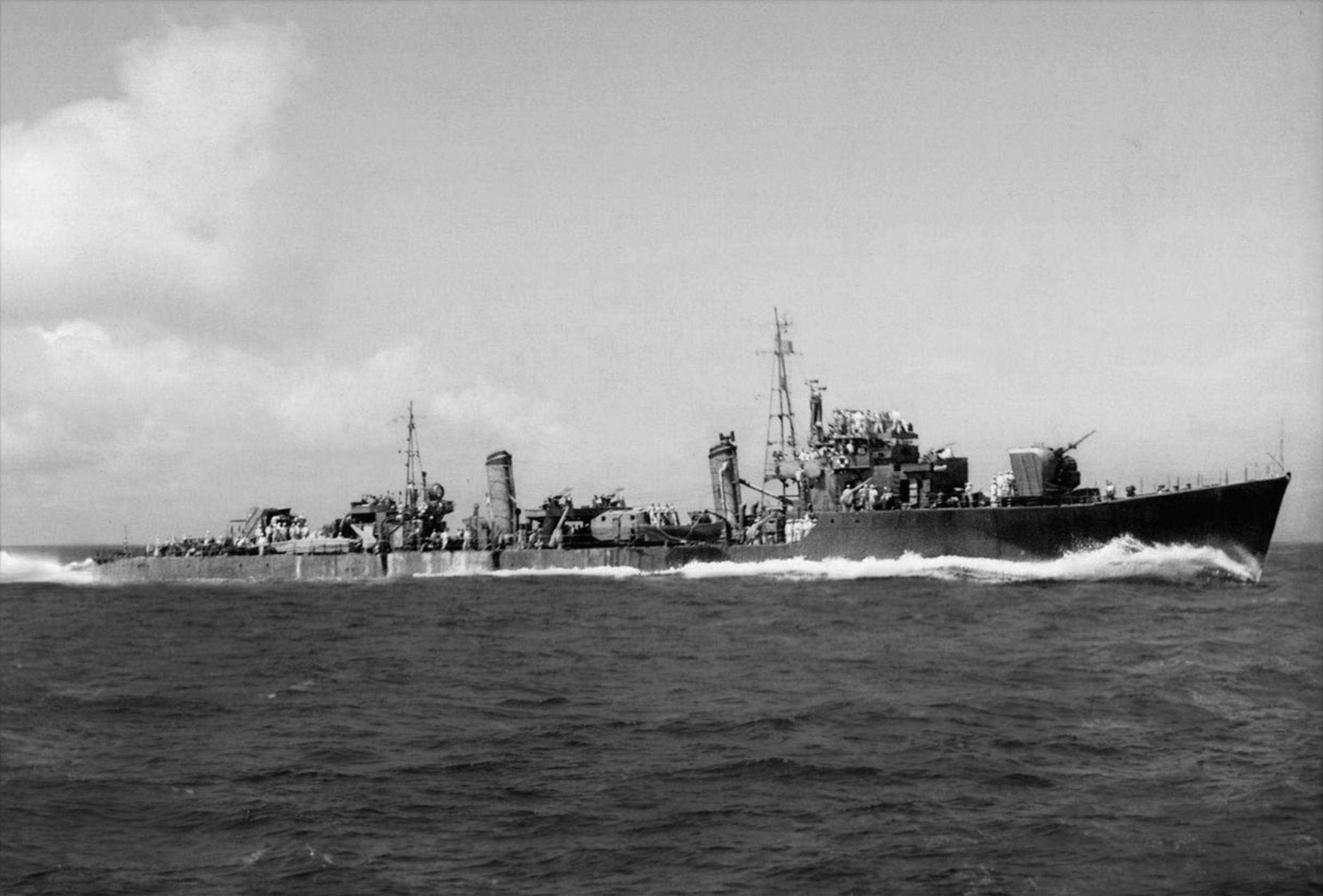
- Maki underway, July or August 1944

History

Empire of Japan
- Name: Maki
- Namesake: Podocarpaceae
- Builder: Maizuru Naval Arsenal
- Laid down: 19 February 1944
- Launched: 10 June 1944
- Completed: 10 August 1944
- Stricken: 5 October 1945
- Fate: Turned over to the United Kingdom, scrapped, 14 August 1947

General characteristics (as built)
- Class & type: Matsu-class escort destroyer
- Displacement: 1,282 t (1,262 long tons) (standard)
- Length: 100 m (328 ft 1 in) (o/a)
- Beam: 9.35 m (30 ft 8 in)
- Draft: 3.3 m (10 ft 10 in)
- Installed power: 2 × water-tube boilers; 19,000 shp (14,000 kW)
- Propulsion: 2 shafts, 2 × geared steam turbines
- Speed: 27.8 knots (51.5 km/h; 32.0 mph)
- Range: 4,680 nmi (8,670 km; 5,390 mi) at 16 knots (30 km/h; 18 mph)
- Complement: 210
- Sensors & processing systems: 1 × Type 22 search radar; 1 × Type 13 early-warning radar
- Armament: 1 × twin, 1 × single 127 mm (5 in) DP guns; 4 × triple, 13 × single 25 mm (1 in) AA guns; 1 × quadruple 610 mm (24 in) torpedo tubes; 2 × rails, 2 × throwers for 36 depth charges

Maki (槇; "Podocarpaceae") was one of 18 Matsu-class escort destroyers built for the Imperial Japanese Navy during World War II. Completed in mid-1944, the ship was damaged during the Battle off Cape Engaño in October by American aircraft. After repairs she was assigned to escort duties and was torpedoed by an American submarine in early 1945. Maki resumed her duties once her damage was repaired and remained in home waters for the rest of the war.

The ship was surrendered to the Allies at the end of the war and used to repatriate Japanese troops until 1947. Mid-year the destroyer was turned over to the United Kingdom and later scrapped.

== Design and description ==
Designed for ease of production, the Matsu class was smaller, slower and more lightly armed than the IJN's previous destroyers. This was because they were intended to be used for second-line duties like escorting convoys, releasing the larger ships for missions with the fleet. The ships measured 100 meters (328 ft 1 in) long overall, with a beam of 9.35 meters (30 ft 8 in) and a draft of 3.3 meters (10 ft 10 in). Their crew numbered 210 officers and enlisted men. They displaced 1,282 metric tons (1,262 long tons) at standard load and 1,554 metric tons (1,529 long tons) at deep load. The ships had two Kampon geared steam turbines, each driving one propeller shaft using steam provided by two Kampon water-tube boilers. The turbines were rated at a total of 19,000 shaft horsepower (14,000 kW) for a speed of 27.8 knots (51.5 km/h; 32.0 mph). The Matsus had a range of 4,680 nautical miles (8,670 km; 5,390 mi) at 16 knots (30 km/h; 18 mph).

The main armament of the Matsu-class ships consisted of three 127-millimeter (5 in) Type 89 dual-purpose guns in one twin-gun mount aft and one single mount forward of the superstructure. The single mount was partially protected against spray by a gun shield. The accuracy of the Type 89 guns was severely reduced against aircraft because no high-angle gunnery director was fitted. The ships carried a total of 25 Type 96 25-millimeter (1 in) anti-aircraft guns in 4 triple and 13 single mounts. The Matsus were equipped with Type 13 early-warning and Type 22 surface-search radars. The ships were also armed with a single rotating quadruple mount amidships for 610-millimeter (24 in) torpedoes. They could deliver their 36 depth charges via two stern rails and two throwers.

== Construction and career ==
Authorized in the late 1942 Modified 5th Naval Armaments Supplement Program, Maki was laid down on 19 February 1944 at the Maizuru Naval Arsenal and launched on 10 June. Upon her completion on 10 August, Maki was assigned to Destroyer Squadron 11 of the Combined Fleet for training. The ship was assigned to Destroyer Division 43, Escort Squadron 31 of the Combined Fleet on 30 September and participated in the Battle off Cape Engaño on 25 October as part of Vice-admiral Jisaburō Ozawa's Northern Force. During the battle she rescued 150 survivors from the sunken destroyer Akizuki and later attempted to rescue survivors from the light aircraft carrier Chiyoda. Maki was moderately damaged by American aircraft from Task Force 38 that hit her with one bomb and near-missed with several others; the bombs damaged her rudder and limited her speed to 20 knots (37 km/h; 23 mph). The aircraft killed 31 members of Maki's crew and 4 rescuees from Akizuki.

Escort Squadron 31 was transferred to the 5th Fleet on 20 November and the destroyer helped to escort the battleship Haruna and the aircraft carrier Jun'yō from Mako, Japanese Taiwan, back to Japan on 6–10 December. Enroute she was torpedoed by the American submarine Plaice on 9 December. Struck by a single torpedo in the bow, Maki was subsequently repaired at Sasebo Naval Arsenal. The squadron rejoined the Combined Fleet on 5 February 1945, but was briefly assigned to the 2nd Fleet from 15 March to 20 April. The ship was transferred to Kure on 26 March, but spent the rest of the war in the Seto Inland Sea. Together with her sister ship Kaya and the destroyer Hanazuki, Maki helped to escort the battleship Yamato through the Inland Sea on 6 April, with the Yamato heading for a suicide attack against allied forces on Okinawa, as a part of Operation Ten-Go, although Maki only went as far as the Bungo Straight. The destroyer was turned over to Allied forces at Kure at the time of the surrender of Japan on 2 September and was stricken from the navy list on 5 October. She was disarmed and used to repatriate Japanese personnel in 1945–1947. Maki was turned over to Great Britain on 14 August of the latter year and subsequently scrapped.

== Bibliography ==
- Jentschura, Hansgeorg; Jung, Dieter & Mickel, Peter (1977). Warships of the Imperial Japanese Navy, 1869–1945. Annapolis, Maryland: United States Naval Institute. ISBN 0-87021-893-X.
- Nevitt, Allyn D. (1998). "IJN Maki: Tabular Record of Movement". www.combinedfleet.com.
- Reynolds, Clark G (1982). The Carrier War. Time-Life Books. ISBN 978-0-8094-3304-9.
- Stille, Mark (2013). Imperial Japanese Navy Destroyers 1919–45 (2): Asahio to Tachibana Classes. Botley, UK: Osprey Publishing. ISBN 978-1-84908-987-6.
- Sturton, Ian (1980). "Japan". In Chesneau, Roger (ed.). Conway's All the World's Fighting Ships 1922–1946. Greenwich, UK: Conway Maritime Press. ISBN 0-85177-146-7.
- Whitley, M. J. (1988). Destroyers of World War Two: An International Encyclopedia. Annapolis, Maryland: Naval Institute Press. ISBN 0-87021-326-1.
