= Kaya (surname) =

Kaya (IPA: [kaˈja]) is a common last name in Turkic countries and means rock.

== People ==
- Açelya Kaya (born 2003), Turkish handball player
- Ahmet Kaya (1957–2000), Kurdish singer from Turkey
- Ali Kaya (athlete) (born Stanley Kiprotich Mukche in 1994), Kenyan-Turkish long-distance runner
- Ali Kaya (serial killer) (born 1979), Turkish serial killer
- Aykut Kaya (karateka) (born 1990), Turkish karateka
- Belkıs Zehra Kaya (born 1984), Turkish judoka
- Cansu Nur Kaya (born 2000), Turkish footballer
- Enes Kaya (born 1984), Turkish television personality
- Ezgi Kaya (born 2001), Turkish long-distance runner
- Fatma Koşer Kaya (born 1968), Dutch politician of Turkish descent
- Fırat Kaya (born 1995), Germany-born Turkish deaf footballer
- Hazal Kaya (born 1990), Turkish actress
- İbrahim Kaya (born 2001), Turkish footballer
- İpek Kaya (born 1994), Turkish-French footballer
- Kıvılcım Kaya (born 1992), Turkish hammer thrower
- Markus Kaya (born 1979), German footballer
- Metin Kaya (born 1961), Turkish-born German politician
- Mihriban Kaya (born 1996), Turkish Paralympian athlete
- Nihan Kaya (born 1979), Turkish writer
- Onur Kaya (born 1986), Belgian footballer of Turkish descent
- Özlem Kaya (athlete) (born 1990), Turkish female middle-distance runner
- Özlem Kaya (swimmer) (born 1992), Turkish Para swimmer
- Rümeysa Pelin Kaya (born 2000), Turkish sport shooter
- Seher Kaya (born 2010) Turkish swimmer
- Semih Kaya (born 1991), Turkish footballer
- Seray Kaya (born 1991), Turkish actress
- Serkan Kaya (born 1984), Turkish marathon runner
- Şükrü Kaya (1883–1959), Turkish politician
- Zehra Kaya (born 2004), Turkish karateka
- Zübeyde Kaya (born 1991), Turkish footballer

Kaya (written: 萱) is also a Japanese surname. Notable people with the surname include:

- Okinori Kaya (賀屋 興宣; 1889–1977), Minister of Finance of Japan
- Kazuma Kaya (萱 和磨; born 1996), Japanese artistic gymnast
- Prince Kaya Kuninori (賀陽宮邦憲王; 1867–1909), member of the Japanese imperial family
- Prince Kaya Tsunenori (賀陽宮恒憲王; 1900–1978),member of the Japanese imperial family

== See also ==
- Kaja (name)
- Kaya (given name)
- Kaya (disambiguation)
