= Kaya =

Kaya may refer to:

== People ==
- Kaya (given name)
- Kaya (surname)

== Places ==
- Kaya, Burkina Faso, a town in Burkina Faso, capital of the department
- Kaya Airport, serving the town
- Kaya Department, a department or commune of Sanmatenga Province in central Burkina Faso
- Kayaköy, a village in Muğla Province, Turkey
- Kaya, Hopa, a village in Artvin Province, Turkey
- Kaya, Kyoto, a town located in Yosa District, Kyoto Prefecture, Japan
- Kaya (Mijikenda), a sacred forest site of the Mijikenda peoples in Kenya
- Kaya, South Sudan, a town in South Sudan
- Skiu-Kaya, adjoining villages in Ladakh, India
- Kaya confederacy, an alternate romanization of the ancient Gaya confederacy on the Korean peninsula

== Popular culture ==
- Kaya (film), a 1969 Yugoslav film
- Kaya FM, a radio station in Johannesburg, South Africa
- Kaya (TV series), a scripted MTV drama television series
- Kaya, a villain in the 2013 Indian film Krrish 3, played by Kangana Ranaut
- Kaya (One Piece), a fictional character in the anime and manga One Piece
- Kaya (Princess Mononoke), a character from the anime movie Princess Mononoke

=== Literature ===
- Kaya Press, an independent publisher

=== Music ===
- Kaya (album), an album by Bob Marley and the Wailers (1978)
  - Kaya Tour, a concert tour organised to support the album
  - "Kaya," the title track of the album
- Kaya (Canadian singer) (born 1968), real name Francis Martin Lavergne
- Kaya (Japanese musician), member of Schwarz Stein
- Kaya (Mauritian musician) (1960–1999), singer and creator of Seggae
- Kaya, a vocal group in the Australian version of The X Factor
- Kaya (Bulgarian band) (1999–present)

== Other uses ==
- Gaya confederacy, a confederacy in southern Korea (42–562 CE)
- Kaya Airlines, a Mozambican airline
- Kaya F.C., a Filipino association football club
- Kaya identity, an equation relating factors that determine the level of human impact on climate, in the form of emissions of the greenhouse gas carbon dioxide
- Kaya (jam), a type of coconut egg jam popular in Malaysia, Singapore and Indonesia
- Kaya-no-miya, the seventh oldest collateral branch (ōke) of the Japanese Imperial Family
- Kaya toast, a popular snack amongst Malaysians and Singaporeans and other SE Asians
- Kaya (tree), Torreya nucifera, or Japanese Nutmeg tree
- Japanese ship Kaya, several ships
- Trikaya, the Buddhist doctrine of three kayas (bodies) of Buddha

== See also ==
- Kayam (disambiguation)
- Kayah (disambiguation)
- Kaia (disambiguation)
- Kaja (disambiguation)
