= Fusō-class battleship =

Imperial Japanese Battleship class

Fusō class
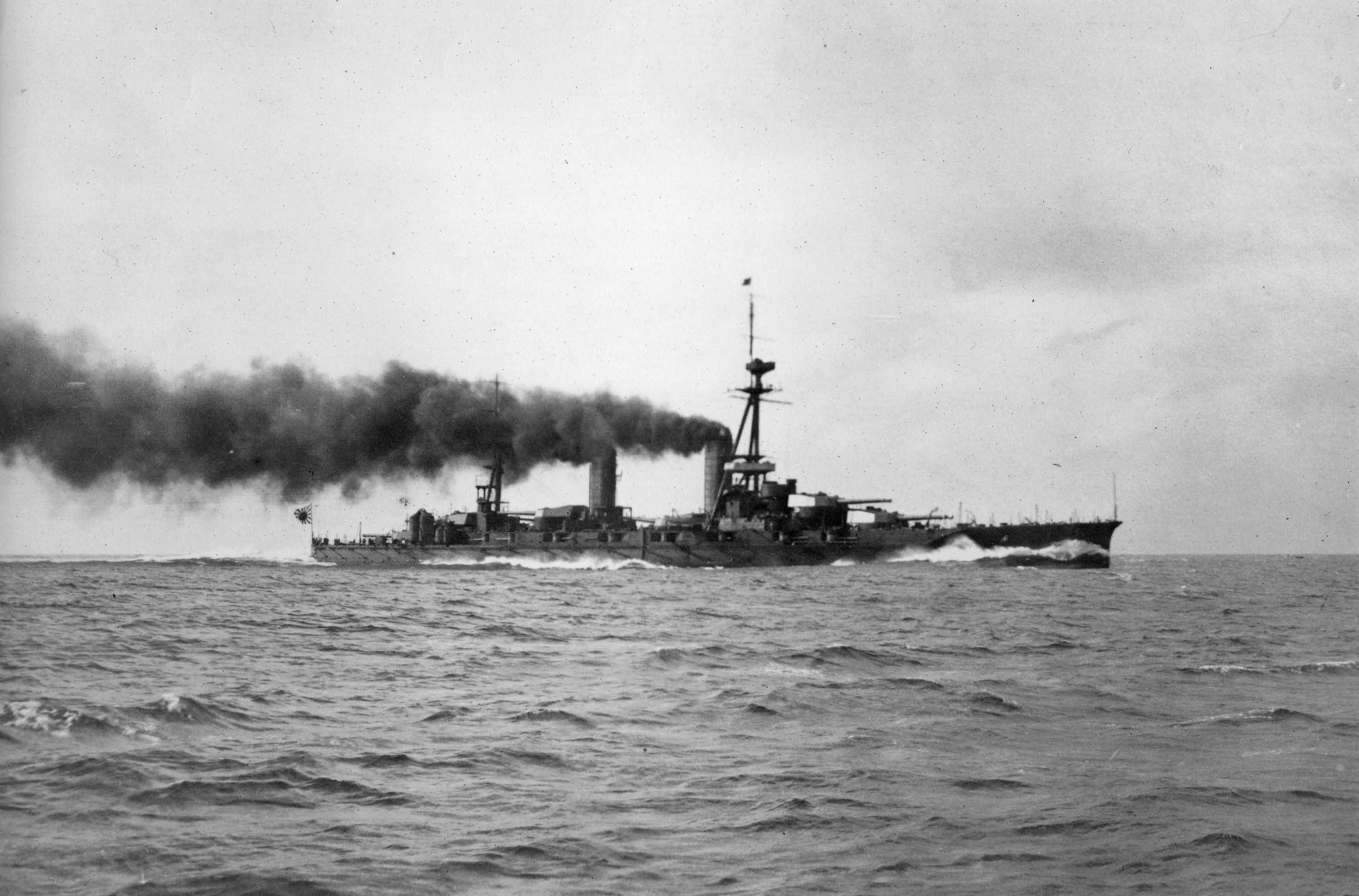
- Yamashiro on her trials, 19 December 1916

Class overview
- Name: Fusō class
- Builders: Kure Naval Arsenal; Yokosuka Naval Arsenal
- Operators: Imperial Japanese Navy
- Preceded by: Kawachi class
- Succeeded by: Ise class
- Built: 1912–1917
- In service: 1915–1944
- In commission: 1915–1944
- Completed: 2
- Lost: 2

General characteristics (as built)
- Type: Dreadnought battleship
- Displacement: 29,326 long tons (29,797 t) (standard)
- Length: 202.7 m (665 ft)
- Beam: 28.7 m (94 ft 2 in)
- Draft: 8.7 m (28 ft 7 in)
- Installed power: 40,000 shp (30,000 kW); 24 × water-tube boilers
- Propulsion: 4 shafts; 2 × steam turbine sets
- Speed: 23 knots (43 km/h; 26 mph)
- Range: 8,000 nmi (15,000 km; 9,200 mi) at 14 knots (26 km/h; 16 mph)
- Complement: 1,193
- Armament: 6 × twin 356 mm (14 in) guns; 16 × single 152 mm (6 in) guns; 5 × single 76 mm (3 in) AA guns; 6 × 533 mm (21 in) torpedo tubes
- Armor: Waterline belt: 305–102 mm (12–4 in); Deck: 51 mm (2 in); Gun turrets: 279 mm (11.0 in); Barbettes: 305 mm (12 in); Conning tower: 351 mm (13.8 in); Bulkheads: 305–102 mm (12–4 in)

General characteristics (1944)
- Displacement: 34,700 long tons (35,300 t)
- Length: 210.3 m (690 ft 0 in)
- Beam: 33.1 m (108 ft 7 in)
- Installed power: 75,000 shp (56,000 kW); 6 × water-tube boilers
- Propulsion: 4 × steam turbines
- Speed: 24.5 knots (45.4 km/h; 28.2 mph)
- Range: 11,800 nmi (21,900 km; 13,600 mi) at 16 knots (30 km/h; 18 mph)
- Complement: 1,900
- Sensors & processing systems: 1 × Type 21 air-search radar; 2 × Type 13 early warning radars; 2 × Type 22 surface-search radars
- Armament: 6 × twin 356 mm guns; 14 × single 152 mm guns; 4 × twin 127 mm (5 in) dual-purpose guns; 96 × 25 mm (1 in) AA guns
- Armor: Deck: 152–51 mm (6–2 in)
- Aircraft carried: 3 × floatplanes
- Aviation facilities: 1 × catapult

The Fusō-class battleships (扶桑型戦艦, Fusō-gata senkan) were a pair of dreadnought battleships built for the Imperial Japanese Navy (IJN) before World War I and completed during the war. Both patrolled briefly off the coast of China before being placed in reserve at the war's end. In 1922, Yamashiro became the first battleship in the IJN to successfully launch aircraft.

During the 1930s, both ships underwent a series of modernizations and reconstructions. Fusō was modernized in two phases (1930–33, 1937–41), while Yamashiro was reconstructed from 1930 to 1935. The modernization increased their armor, replaced and upgraded their machinery, and rebuilt their superstructures into a distinctive pagoda mast style. Despite the expensive reconstructions, both vessels were obsolete by World War II, and neither saw significant action in the early years of the war. Fusō served as a troop transport in 1943, while Yamashiro was relegated to training duty in the Inland Sea. Both received better anti-aircraft weapons in 1944 before transferring to Singapore in August 1944.

Fusō and Yamashiro were the only two Japanese battleships at the Battle of Surigao Strait, the southernmost action of the Battle of Leyte Gulf, and both were lost in the early hours of 25 October 1944. Fusō burned and sank within an hour of being torpedoed. Yamashiro encountered six U.S. Navy battleships and eight cruisers, sinking along with Vice Admiral Shōji Nishimura. Only ten crew members from each ship survived.

== Background ==
The design of the Fusō-class battleships was shaped both by the ongoing international naval arms race and a desire among Japanese naval planners to maintain a fleet of capital ships powerful enough to defeat the United States Navy in an encounter in Japanese territorial waters. The IJN's fleet of battleships had proven highly successful in 1905, the last year of the Russo-Japanese War, which culminated in the destruction of the Russian Second and Third Pacific Squadrons at the Battle of Tsushima.

In the aftermath of that war, the Japanese Empire immediately turned its focus to the two remaining rivals for imperial dominance in the Pacific Ocean: Britain and the United States. Satō Tetsutarō, a Japanese Navy admiral and military theorist, speculated that conflict would inevitably arise between Japan and at least one of its two main rivals. To that end, he called for the Japanese Navy to maintain a fleet with at least 70% as many capital ships as the US Navy. This ratio, Satō theorized, would enable the Imperial Japanese Navy to defeat the US Navy in one major battle in Japanese waters in any eventual conflict. Accordingly, the 1907 Imperial Defense Policy called for the construction of a battle fleet of eight modern battleships, 20,000 long tons (20,321 t) each, and eight modern armored cruisers, 18,000 long tons (18,289 t) each. This was the genesis of the Eight-Eight Fleet Program, the development of a cohesive battle line of sixteen capital ships.

The launch of HMS Dreadnought in 1906 by the Royal Navy raised the stakes, and complicated Japan's plans. Displacing 17,900 long tons (18,200 t) and armed with ten 12-inch (30.5 cm) guns, Dreadnought rendered all existing battleships obsolete by comparison. The launch of the battlecruiser HMS Invincible the following year was a further setback for Japan's quest for parity. When the two new Satsuma-class battleships and two Tsukuba-class armored cruisers, launched by 1911, were outclassed by their British counterparts, the Eight-Eight Fleet Program was restarted.

The first battleships built for the renewed Eight-Eight Fleet Program were the two dreadnoughts of the Kawachi class, ordered in 1907 and laid down in 1908. In 1910, the Navy put forward a request to the Diet (parliament) to secure funding for the entirety of the program at once. Because of economic constraints, the proposal was cut first by the Navy Ministry to seven battleships and three battlecruisers, then by the cabinet to four armored cruisers and a single battleship. The Diet amended this by authorizing the construction of four battlecruisers (the Kongō class) and one battleship, later named Fusō, in what became the Naval Emergency Expansion bill.

== Design ==
Fusō was designed to work in conjunction with the four battlecruisers. After coordination with the British on the Kongō class, Japanese designers had access to the latest British design studies in naval architecture and were now able to design their own capital ships. In an effort to outmatch the American New York class, planners called for a ship armed with twelve 14-inch (36 cm) guns and faster than the 21 knots (39 km/h; 24 mph) of their rivals. Vickers files show that the Japanese had access to the designs for double- and triple-gun turrets, yet opted for six double turrets over four triple turrets. (Note: Postwar Japanese accounts suggest that the system of four triple turrets was superior for defensive combat, while six double turrets were superior for offensive combat, meaning that six double turrets could engage more targets at once than four triple turrets.)

The final design—designated A-64 by the IJN—called for a displacement of 29,000 long tons (29,465 t) with twelve 14-inch (36 cm) guns in six double turrets (two forward, two aft, two separated amidships) with a top speed of 23 knots (43 km/h; 26 mph). This design was superior to its American counterparts in armament, armor and speed, thus following the doctrine the Japanese had used since the First Sino-Japanese War of 1894–95 of compensating for quantitative inferiority with qualitative superiority.

== Description ==
The ships had a length of 202.7 meters (665 ft) overall. They had a beam of 28.7 meters (94 ft 2 in) and a draft of 8.7 meters (28 ft 7 in). They displaced 29,326 metric tons (28,863 long tons) at standard load. Their crew consisted of 1,198 officers and enlisted men in 1915 and 1,396 in 1935. During World War II, the crew probably totalled around 1,800–1,900 men.

During the ships' modernization during the 1930s, their forward superstructures were enlarged with multiple platforms added to their tripod foremasts. The rear superstructures were rebuilt to accommodate mounts for 127-millimetre (5 in) anti-aircraft (AA) guns and additional fire-control directors. Both ships were also given torpedo bulges to improve their underwater protection and to compensate for the weight of the additional armor. In addition, their sterns were lengthened by 7.62 meters (25.0 ft). These changes increased their overall length to 212.75 m (698 ft), their beam to 33.1 m (108 ft 7 in) and their draft to 9.69 meters (31 ft 9 in). Their displacement increased nearly 4,000 long tons (4,100 t) to 39,154 long tons (39,782 t) at deep load.

=== Propulsion ===
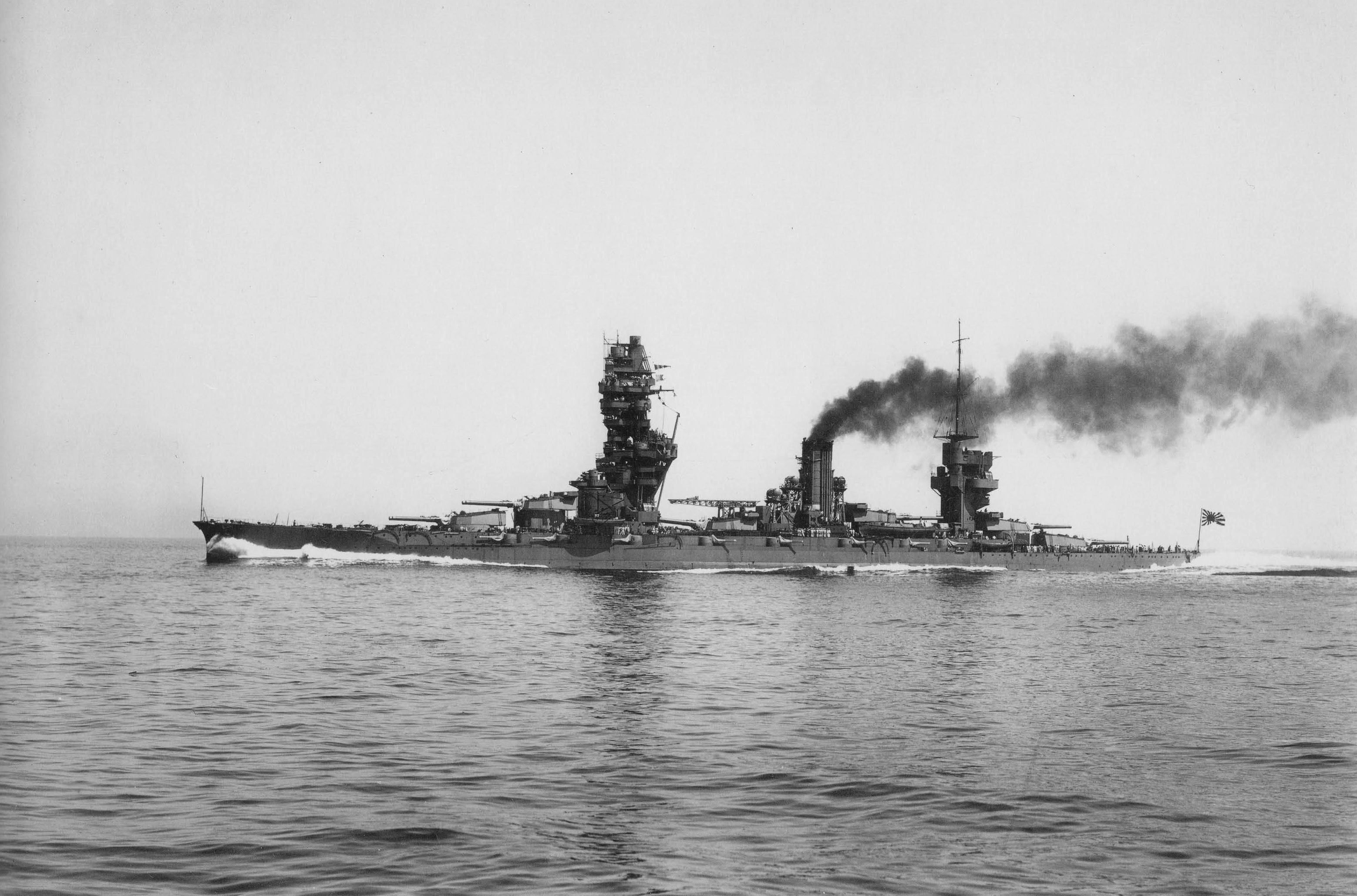
Fusō running full-power trials on 10 May 1933 after her first reconstruction

The Fusō-class ships had two sets of Brown-Curtis direct-drive steam turbines, each of which drove two propeller shafts. The medium-pressure turbines drove the wing shafts while the high- and low-pressure turbines drove the inner shafts. The turbines were designed to produce a total of 40,000 shaft horsepower (30,000 kW), using steam provided by 24 Miyahara-type water-tube boilers, each of which consumed a mixture of coal and oil. The ships had a stowage capacity of 4,000 long tons (4,100 t) of coal and 1,000 long tons (1,000 t) of fuel oil, giving them a range of 8,000 nautical miles (15,000 km; 9,200 mi) at a speed of 14 knots (26 km/h; 16 mph). Both ships exceeded their designed speed of 22.5 knots (41.7 km/h; 25.9 mph) during their sea trials; Fusō reached 23 knots (43 km/h; 26 mph) from 46,500 shp (34,700 kW) and Yamashiro exceeded that with 23.3 knots (43.2 km/h; 26.8 mph) from 47,730 shp (35,590 kW).

During their 1930s modernization, the Miyahara boilers on each ship were replaced by six new Kanpon oil-fired boilers, fitted into the former aft boiler room, and the forward funnel was removed. The Brown-Curtis turbines were replaced by four geared Kanpon turbines with a designed output of 75,000 shp (56,000 kW). On her trials, Fusō reached a top speed of 24.7 knots (45.7 km/h; 28.4 mph) from 76,889 shp (57,336 kW). The fuel storage of the ships was increased to a total of 5,100 long tons (5,200 t) of fuel oil that gave them a range of 11,800 nautical miles (21,900 km; 13,600 mi) at a speed of 16 knots (30 km/h; 18 mph).

=== Armament ===
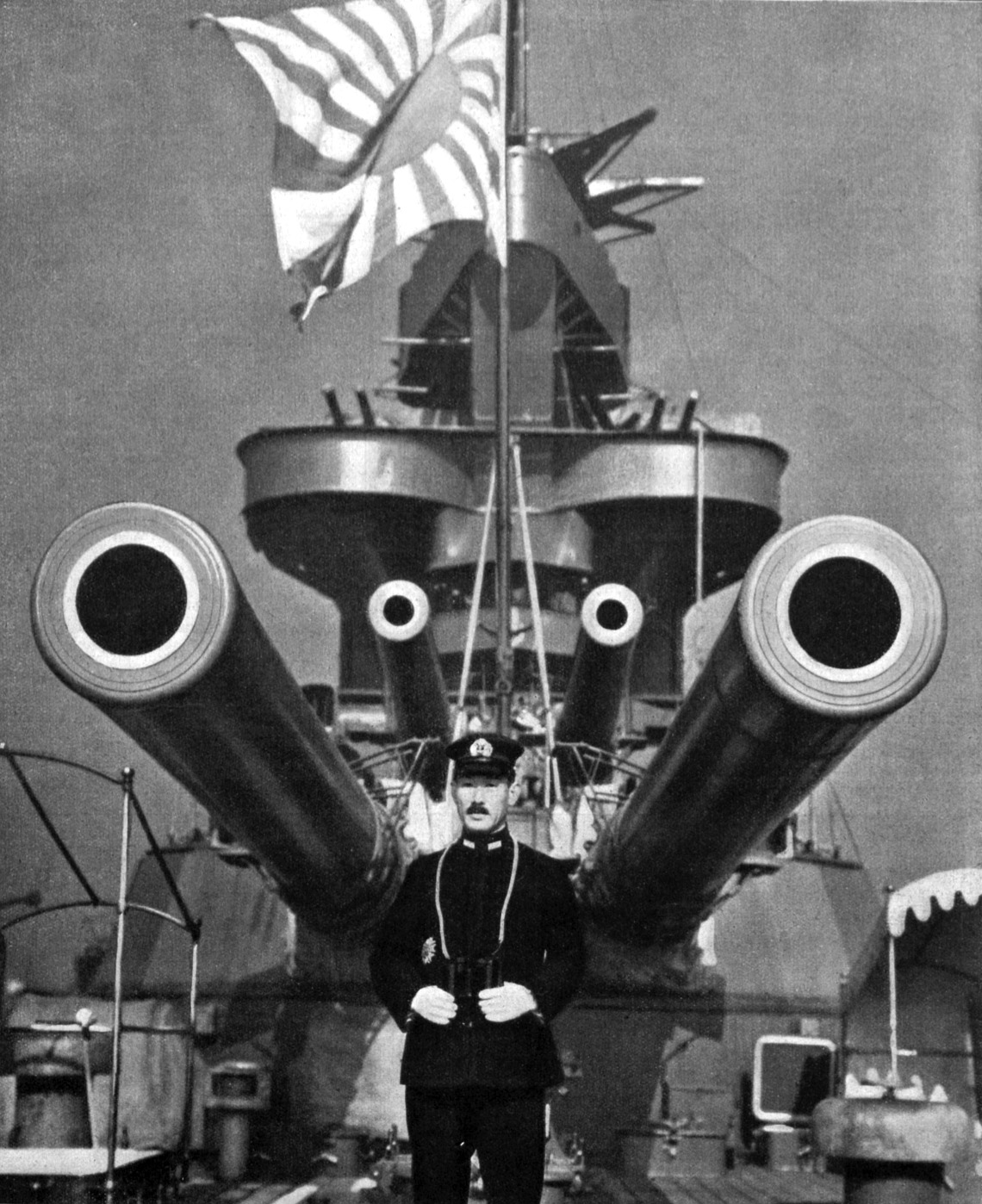
Admiral Sankichi Takahashi commanded Fusō in 1924–1925

The twelve 45-calibre 14-inch guns of the Fusō class were mounted in six twin-gun turrets, numbered from front to rear, each of which weighed 615 long tons (625 t). The turrets had an elevation capability of −5/+20 degrees. They were arranged in an uncommon 2-1-1-2 style with superfiring pairs of turrets fore and aft; the middle turrets were not superfiring, and had a funnel between them. The decision to use six twin turrets rather than four triple turrets greatly affected the entire design of the class because the two extra turrets required a longer ship and increased the amount of armor required to protect the ship. The location of the third and fourth turrets proved particularly problematic to the design of the class because the amidships turrets were not superfiring as in the subsequent Ise-class battleships. This further increased the length of the ships because the barrels of the upper turret did not protrude over the lower turret, requiring more space than a pair of superfiring turrets. Mounted amidships along the centerline of the ship, they had restricted arcs of fire, and their position forced the boiler rooms to be placed in less than ideal locations. Another complication was the need to fit extra insulation and air conditioning in the magazines of the amidships turrets to protect them from the heat generated in the adjacent boiler rooms. Originally both amidship gun turrets faced to the rear, but Fusō's turret No. 3 was moved to face forward during her reconstruction in order to accommodate additional platforms around her funnel.

The main battery of the Fusō class underwent multiple modernizations throughout the ships' careers. During the first reconstruction of both vessels, the elevation of the main guns was increased to −5/+43 degrees, giving a maximum firing range of 35,450 yards (32,420 m). The recoil mechanism of the guns was also changed from a hydraulic to pneumatic system, which allowed for a faster firing cycle of the main guns.

By World War II, the guns used Type 91 armor-piercing, capped shells. Each of these shells weighed 673.5 kilograms (1,485 lb) and had a muzzle velocity of 775 meters per second (2,540 ft/s). They had a maximum range of 27,800 meters (30,400 yd) at +30 degrees of elevation and 35,450 meters (38,770 yd) at +43 degrees after modernization. Also available was a 625-kilogram (1,378 lb) high-explosive shell that had a muzzle velocity of 805 meters per second (2,640 ft/s). A special Type 3 San Shiki incendiary shrapnel shell was developed in the 1930s for anti-aircraft use.

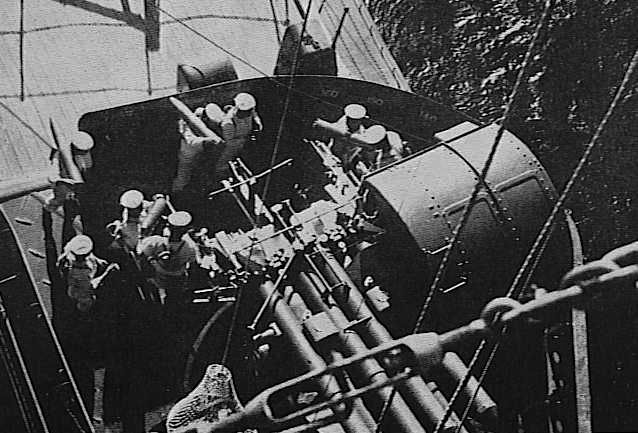
A twin-gun 127 mm mount on board Nagato, the same as used on board the Fusō class

As built, the Fusō class was fitted with a secondary armament of sixteen 50-caliber six-inch guns mounted in single casemates along the sides of the hull at the level of the upper deck. Eight guns were mounted per side, and each had an arc of fire of 130 degrees and a maximum elevation of +15 degrees. Each gun could fire a 45.36-kilogram (100 lb) high-explosive projectile a maximum distance of 22,970 yards (21,000 m) at a rate of between four and six shots per minute. During their reconstruction in the 1930s, the maximum elevation of the guns was increased to +30 degrees, which increased their maximum range by approximately 900 metres (980 yd).

The ships also mounted five or six 40-caliber 76-millimetre (3 in) anti-aircraft (AA) guns. The high-angle guns were in single mounts on both sides of the forward superstructure, both sides of the second funnel, and each side of the aft superstructure (Fusō lacked the starboard side aft gun). Each of these guns had a maximum elevation of +75 degrees, and could fire a 6 kg (13 lb) projectile with a muzzle velocity of 680 m/s (2,200 ft/s) to a maximum height of 7,500 metres (24,600 ft). Both ships were equipped with six submerged 533-millimetre (21 in) torpedo tubes, three on each broadside.

The Fusō class's secondary armament changed significantly over time. During the modernizations of the 1930s, all of the 76 mm guns were replaced with eight 40-caliber 127 mm (5 in) dual-purpose guns. These guns were fitted on both sides of the fore and aft superstructures in four twin-gun mounts. When firing at surface targets, the guns had a range of 14,700 metres (16,100 yd); they had a maximum ceiling of 9,440 metres (30,970 ft) at their maximum elevation of +90 degrees. Their maximum rate of fire was 14 rounds a minute, but their sustained rate of fire was around 8 rounds per minute. During reconstruction, the two foremost 152 mm guns were also removed.

The light AA armament of the Fusō class changed dramatically from 1933 to 1944. During the first reconstruction, Fusō was fitted with four quadruple 13.2 mm (0.52 in) machine-guns, while Yamashiro was fitted with eight twin 25-millimeter (1 in) gun mounts. Both weapons were license-built French Hotchkiss designs. The 25 mm guns were mounted on the Fusō class in single, double and triple mounts. This model was the standard Japanese light anti-aircraft gun during World War II, but it suffered from severe design shortcomings that rendered it a largely ineffective weapon. The twin and triple mounts "lacked sufficient speed in train or elevation; the gun sights were unable to handle fast targets; the gun exhibited excessive vibration; the magazine was too small, and, finally, the gun produced excessive muzzle blast". The configuration of the anti-aircraft guns varied significantly; by the end of their final reconstruction, the Fusō class mounted eight twin mounts. In 1943, seventeen single and two twin-mounts were added for a total of 37. In August 1944, both were fitted with another twenty-three single, six twin and eight triple-mounts, for a total of 96 anti-aircraft guns in their final configuration.

=== Armor ===
When the Fusō class was completed, the ships' armor was "typical for a pre-Jutland battleship". As built, the armor accounted for a displacement of 8,588 long tons (8,726 t), approximately 29% of the class's total displacement. Their waterline armor belt was 305 to 229 millimetres (12 to 9 in) thick; below it was a strake of 102 mm (4 in) armor. The deck armor ranged in thickness from 32 to 51 mm (1.3 to 2.0 in). The turrets were protected with an armor thickness of 279.4 mm (11 in) on the face, 228.6 mm (9 in) on the sides, and 114.5 mm (4.5 in) on the roof. The barbettes of the turrets were protected by armor 305 mm thick, while the casemates of the 152 mm guns were protected by armor plates of equal thickness. The sides of the conning tower were 351 millimetres (13.8 in) thick. Additionally, the vessels contained 737 watertight compartments (574 underneath the armor deck, 163 above) to preserve buoyancy in the event of battle damage.

During their reconstruction, the armor of the battleships was substantially upgraded. Their deck armor was increased to a maximum thickness of 114 mm (4.5 in), and a longitudinal 76 mm bulkhead of high-tensile steel was added to improve the underwater protection. This brought the total armor tonnage up to 12,199 long tons (12,395 t), approximately 31% of the total displacement of the Fusō class. Even after these improvements, the armor was still incapable of withstanding 14-inch shells.

=== Aircraft ===
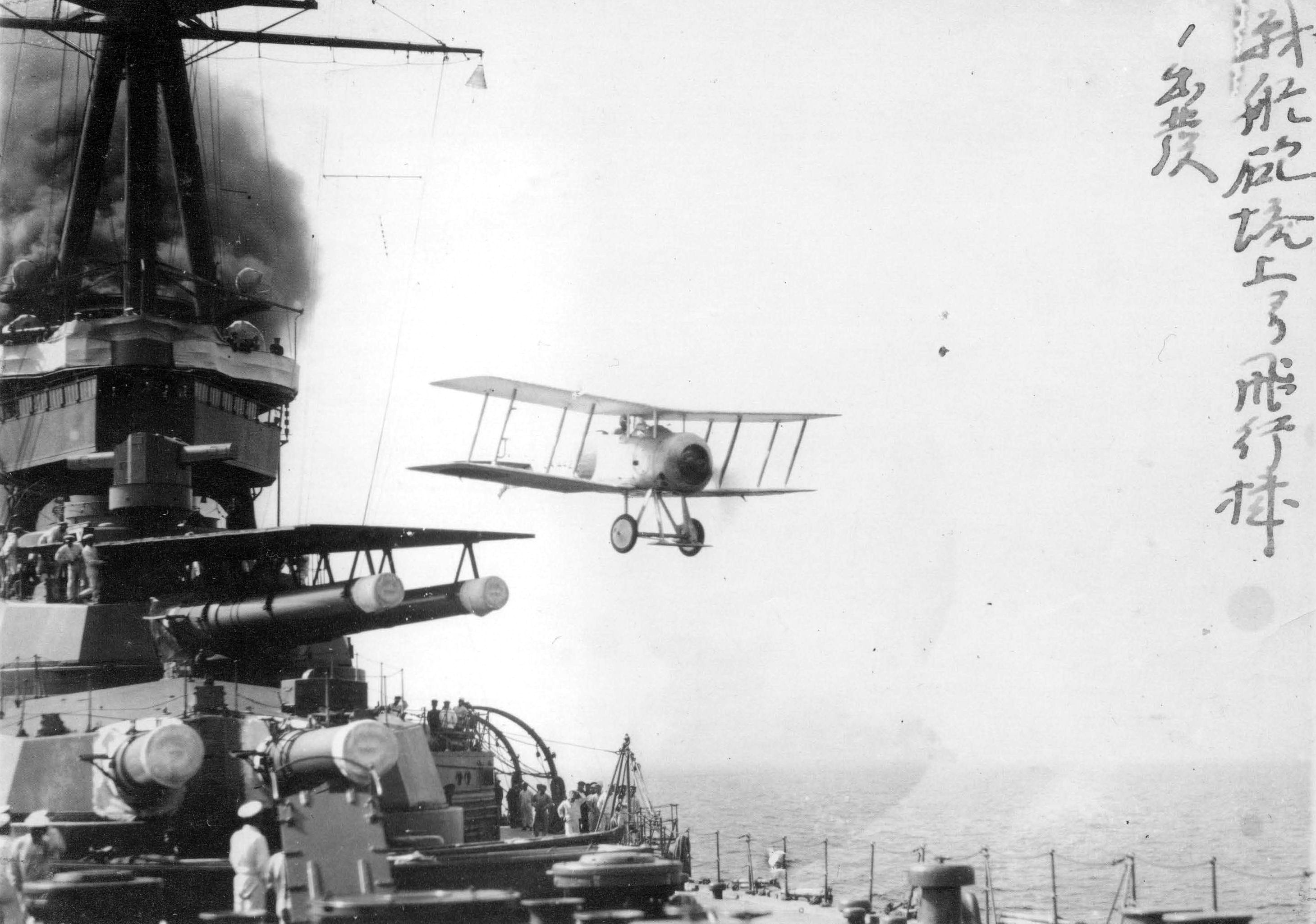
A Sparrowhawk taking off from Yamashiro

Yamashiro was briefly fitted with an aircraft flying-off platform on Turret No. 2 in 1922. She successfully launched Gloster Sparrowhawk and Sopwith Camel fighters from it, becoming the first Japanese ship to launch aircraft. When she was modernized in the 1930s, a catapult and a collapsible crane were fitted on the stern, and both ships were equipped to operate three floatplanes, although no hangar was provided. The initial Nakajima E4N2 biplanes were replaced by Nakajima E8N2 biplanes in 1938 and then by Mitsubishi F1M biplanes from 1942 on.

=== Fire control and sensors ===
When completed in 1915, the ships had two 3.5-meter (11 ft 6 in) and two 1.5-meter (4 ft 11 in) rangefinders in the forward superstructure, a 4.5-meter (14 ft 9 in) rangefinder on the roof of Turret No. 2, and 4.5-meter rangefinders in Turrets 3, 4, and 5. In late 1917 a fire-control director was installed on a platform on the foremast. The 4.5-meter rangefinders were replaced by 8-meter (26 ft 3 in) instruments in 1923. During Fusō's first modernization, four directors for the 12.7 cm AA guns were added, one on each side of the fore and aft superstructures, and an eight-meter rangefinder was installed at the top of the pagoda mast. This was replaced by a 10-meter (32 ft 10 in) rangefinder during 1938. At the same time, the two 3.5-meter rangefinders on the forward superstructure were replaced by directors for the 25 mm AA guns. Additional 25 mm directors were installed on platforms on each side of the funnel. (Note: Available sources do not cover the fire control for Yamashiro in any detail.)

While the ships were in drydock in July 1943, Type 21 air search radar was installed on the roof of the 10-meter rangefinder at the top of the pagoda mast. In August 1944, two Type 22 surface search radar units were installed on the pagoda mast and two Type 13 early warning radar units were fitted. Yamashiro mounted hers on the mainmast, while Fusō was the only Japanese battleship to mount radar on her funnel.

== Ships ==
Construction data
Ship	Builder	Laid down	Launched	Completed	Fate	Ref.
Fusō	Kure Naval Arsenal	11 Mar 1912	28 Mar 1914	8 Nov 1915	Sunk during the Battle of Surigao Strait, 25 Oct 1944	
Yamashiro	Yokosuka Naval Arsenal	20 Nov 1913	3 Nov 1915	31 Mar 1917	Sunk during the Battle of Surigao Strait, 25 Oct 1944	

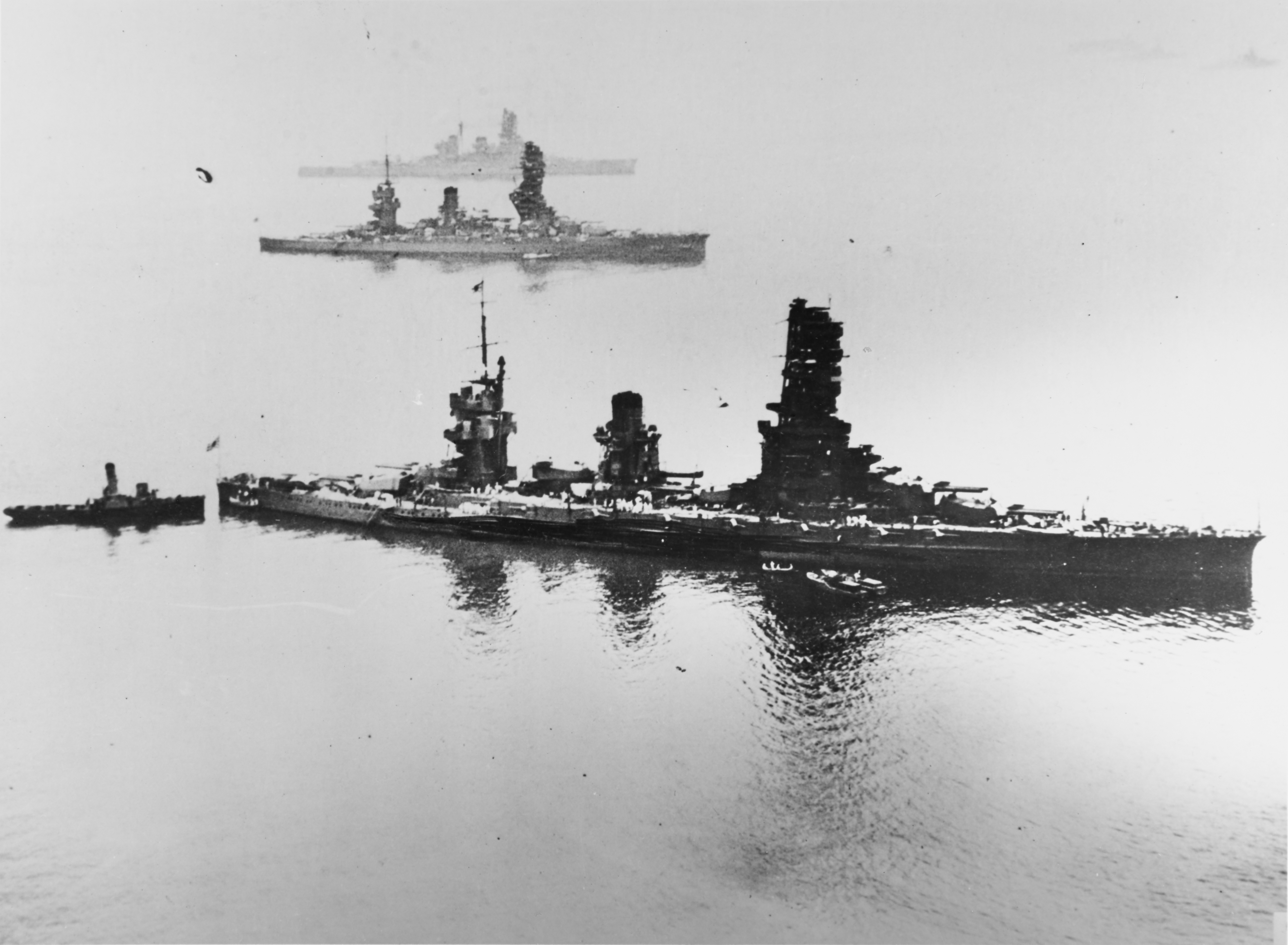
Yamashiro, Fusō and the fast battleship Haruna (in the distance) in the late 1930s

When she was completed in 1915, Fusō was considered the first modern battleship of the Japanese Navy. She outclassed her American counterparts of the New York class in firepower and speed, and was considered the "most powerfully armed battleship in the world".

Two advanced versions of the class were planned, but the final design differed so markedly from Fusō's that they became the Ise class.

Despite extensive modernization in the 1930s, both battleships were considered obsolescent by the commencement of World War II. Following the loss of much of Japan's aircraft carrier fleet by 1943, a proposal was floated that would have converted both vessels into hybrid battleship-carriers. Work was scheduled to commence in June 1943, but the two Ise-class battleships were given higher priority and converted first. Afterwards, the Fusōs were planned to undergo a similar conversion but this never materialized.

== Service ==
Fusō was commissioned on 8 November 1915 and assigned to the 1st Division (Note: Skulski and Preston use Squadron while Hackett uses BatDiv, presumably Battleship Division.) of the 1st Fleet on 13 December. The ship did not take part in any combat during World War I, as there were no longer any forces of the Central Powers in Asia by the time she was completed. She served as the flagship of the 1st Division during 1917 and 1918, and patrolled off the coast of China during that time. The ship aided survivors of the Great Kanto Earthquake between 9 and 22 September 1923. In the 1920s, Fusō conducted training off the coast of China and was often placed in reserve. After assignment as a training ship in 1936 and 1937, she briefly operated in Chinese waters in early 1939.

Yamashiro was completed on 31 March 1917 and assigned to the 1st Division of the 1st Fleet in 1917–18, though she had no combat role in World War I. Like her sister, she patrolled off the coast of China during the war and assisted during the Great Kanto Earthquake. Little detailed information is available about her activities during the 1920s, although she did make a port visit to Port Arthur, China, on 5 April 1925 and also conducted training off the coast of China. Yamashiro became flagship of the Combined Fleet in 1935. In early 1941, the ship experimentally launched radio-controlled Kawanishi E7K2 floatplanes.

=== World War II ===
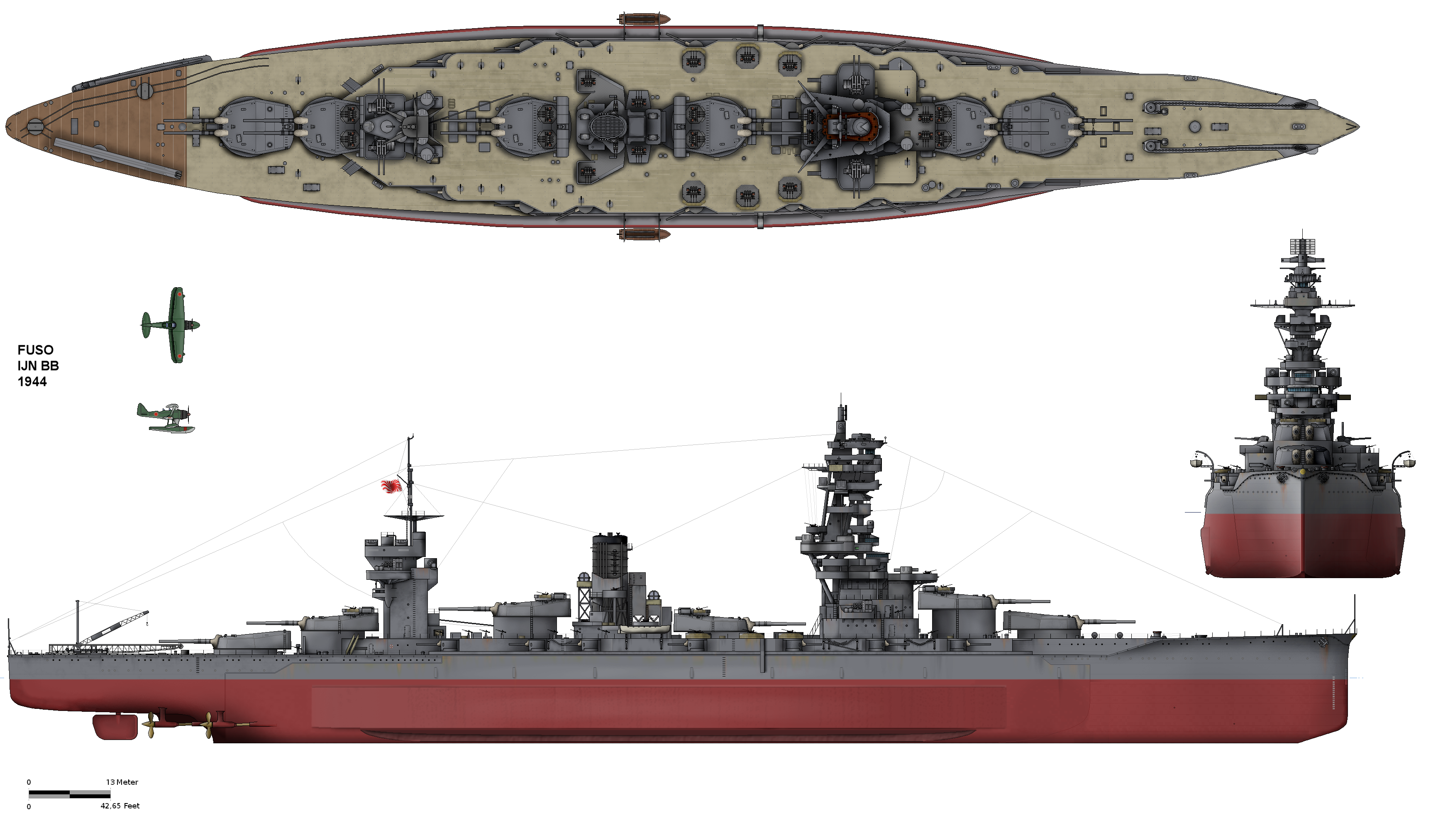
Fusō as she appeared in October 1944

In April and May 1941, Fusō and Yamashiro were attached to the 2nd Division of the 1st Fleet, but the two ships spent most of the war around Japan, mostly at the anchorage at Hashirajima in Hiroshima Bay. When the war started for Japan on 8 December, (Note: Japan Standard Time is 19 hours ahead of Hawaiian Standard Time, so in Japan, the attack on Pearl Harbor happened on 8 December.) the division sortied from Hashirajima to the Bonin Islands as distant support for the 1st Air Fleet attacking Pearl Harbor, and returned six days later. On 18 April 1942, they pursued but did not catch the American carrier force that had launched the Doolittle Raid. Commanded by Vice-Admiral Shirō Takasu, the division set sail with the Aleutian Support Group on 28 May, at the same time that most of the Imperial Fleet began an attack on Midway Island (Operation MI).

Afterwards, Yamashiro returned to home waters, where she stayed until August 1943; the next month, she became a training ship for midshipmen. In July 1943, Yamashiro was at the Yokosuka drydock, then was briefly assigned as a training ship on 15 September before loading troops on 13 October bound for Truk Naval Base, arriving on the 20th. She sailed for Japan on 31 October. On 8 November, the submarine USS Halibut fired torpedoes at Junyo that missed, but hit Yamashiro with a torpedo that failed to detonate. Returning to Japanese waters, Yamashiro resumed her training duties.

During the US invasion of Saipan in June 1944, Japanese troop ships attempted to reinforce the defenses, that were sunk by submarines. Shigenori Kami, chief of operations of the Navy Staff, volunteered to command Yamashiro to carry troops and equipment to Saipan. If the ship actually reached the island, he intended to deliberately beach the ship before it could be sunk and to use its artillery to defend the island. After Ryūnosuke Kusaka, Chief of Staff of the Combined Fleet, also volunteered to go, Prime Minister Hideki Tōjō approved the plan, known as Operation Y-GO, but the operation was cancelled after the decisive defeat in the Battle of the Philippine Sea on 19 and 20 June.

Fusō was assigned to the Imperial Japanese Naval Academy at Etajima, Hiroshima, for use as a training ship between 15 November 1942 and 15 January 1943. On 8 June, she rescued 353 survivors from Mutsu when that ship exploded at Hashirajima. After carrying supplies to Truk Naval Base in August, Fusō made for Eniwetok two months later to be in a position to intercept an anticipated attack, returning to Truk on October 26. She arrived on 21 February at Lingga Island, and was employed there as a training ship, before refitting at Singapore between 13 and 27 April and returning to Lingga. She was transferred to Tawi-Tawi on 11 May, and provided cover for the abortive attempts to reinforce Biak Island at the end of the month. Fusō sailed to Tarakan Island off Borneo to refuel in early July before returning to Japan, escaping an attack by the submarine USS Pomfret. She was refitted in early August at Kure.

Both ships were transferred to Battleship Division 2 of the 2nd Fleet on 10 September. Yamashiro and Fusō alternated in the role of division flagship under Vice Admiral Shōji Nishimura. They departed Kure on 23 September for Lingga Island, carrying the Army's 25th Independent Mixed Regiment, and escaped an attack by the submarine USS Plaice the next day. They arrived on 4 October, then transferred to Brunei to offload their troops and refuel in preparation for Operation Shō-Gō, the attempt to destroy the American fleet conducting the invasion of Leyte.

==== Battle of Surigao Strait ====
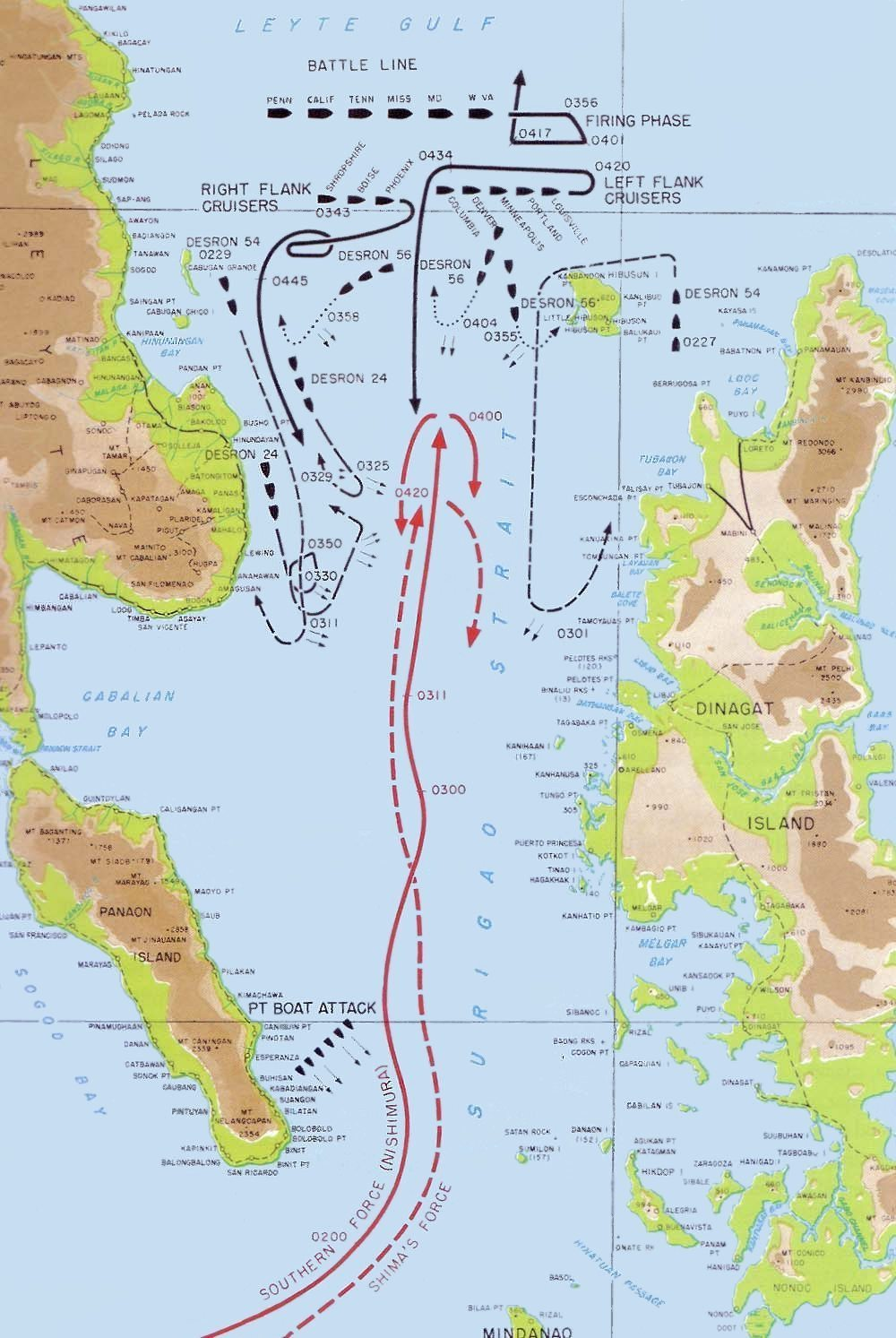
The Battle of Surigao Strait

Nishimura's "Southern Force" left Brunei at 15:30 on 22 October 1944, heading east into the Sulu Sea and then to the northeast into the Mindanao Sea.

At 09:08 on 24 October, Yamashiro, Fusō and the heavy cruiser Mogami spotted a group of 27 planes, including Grumman TBF Avenger torpedo bombers and Curtiss SB2C Helldiver dive bombers escorted by Grumman F6F Hellcat fighters, that had been launched from the carrier Enterprise. Around 20 sailors on Yamashiro were killed by strafing and rocket attacks. Fusō's catapult and both floatplanes were destroyed. A bomb hit the ship near Turret No. 2 and penetrated the decks, killing everyone in No. 1 secondary battery.

Intending to join Vice-Admiral Takeo Kurita's force in Leyte Gulf, they passed west of Mindanao Island into Surigao Strait, where they met a large force of battleships, cruisers and destroyers lying in wait. The Battle of Surigao Strait would become the southernmost action in the Battle of Leyte Gulf.

Nishimura radioed Admiral Soemu Toyoda at 20:13: "It is my plan to charge into Leyte Gulf to [reach] a point off Dulag at 04:00 hours on the 25th." At 22:52, his force spotted three or four motor torpedo boats and opened fire, damaging PT-130 and PT-152 and forcing all of them to retreat before they could launch their torpedoes.

After repelling waves of attacks from PT boats, Nishimura's ships were then subjected to devastating torpedo attacks from the American destroyers deployed on both sides of their axis of advance. One or two torpedoes, possibly fired by the destroyer Melvin, hit Fusō amidships on the starboard side at 03:09 on the 25th; she listed to starboard, slowed down, and fell out of formation. Japanese and American witnesses said Fusō broke in half, and that both halves remained afloat and burning for an hour. Historian John Toland agreed in 1970 that Fusō had broken in two, but historian Anthony Tully said, "Fuso was torpedoed, and as a result of progressive flooding, upended and capsized within forty minutes." She sank between 03:38 and 03:50; only a few dozen men survived her rapid descent and massive oil fire, and only 10 reached shore.

At 03:52, Yamashiro was attacked by a large formation to the north commanded by Rear Admiral Jesse Oldendorf. First came 6- and 8-inch (200 mm) shells from a line of eight cruisers, then 14-inch (360 mm) and 16-inch (410 mm) shells from a line of six battleships. The main bombardment lasted 18 minutes, and Yamashiro was the only target for seven minutes. The first rounds hit the forecastle and pagoda mast, and soon the entire battleship appeared to be ablaze. Yamashiro's two forward turrets targeted her assailants, and the secondary armament targeted the American destroyers plaguing Mogami and the destroyer Asagumo. There was a big explosion at 04:04, possibly from one of the middle turrets. She was hit between 04:03 and 04:09 near the starboard engine room by a torpedo, and Nishimura radioed to Kurita: "We proceed till totally annihilated. I have definitely accomplished my mission as pre-arranged. Please rest assured." At the same time, Oldendorf issued a cease-fire order to the entire formation after hearing that the destroyer Albert W. Grant was taking friendly fire, and the Japanese ships also ceased fire.

Yamashiro increased speed, but she had been hit by two to four torpedoes, and after two more torpedo hits near the starboard engine room, she was listing 45 degrees to port. Shinoda gave the command to abandon ship, but neither he nor Nishimura made any attempt to leave the conning tower as the ship capsized within five minutes and quickly sank, stern first, vanishing from radar between 04:19 and 04:21. Only 10 crewmembers of the estimated 1,636 officers and crew on board survived.
