= Kaya (given name) =

Kaya is a given name most commonly found in Turkey and Japan.

== Turkish name ==
Kaya in Turkish means rock and it's a traditional unisex given name

- Kaya Erdem (born 1928), Turkish politician
- Kaya Köstepen (1934–2011), Turkish footballer
- Kaya Peker (born 1980), Turkish basketball player
- Kaya Tarakçı (born 1981), Turkish footballer
- Kaya Yanar (born 1973), German comedian
- Kaya Sultan (born 1632), Ottoman princess

== Japanese name ==
- Kaya (Japanese musician), Japanese singer
- Kaya Chakrabortty (born 2001), Japanese beauty pageant titleholder
- Kaya Kiyohara (清原 果耶; born 2002), Japanese actress and model
- Kaya Okuno (奥野 香耶; born 1991), Japanese voice actress

== Others ==
- Kaya (Mauritian musician), Mauritian singer
- Kaya Brüel (born 1972), Danish singer, songwriter and actress
- Kaya Cattouse (born 1990), Belizean cyclist
- Kaya Christian, American model
- Kaya Forson (born 2002), Ghanaian swimmer
- Kaya Henderson (born 1970), American educator, activist and civil servant
- Kaya Jones (born 1984), American singer, model and actress
- Kaya Malotana (born 1976), South African rugby union player
- Kaya Oakes, American writer and poet
- Kaya Scodelario (born 1992), English actress
- Kaya Stewart (born 2000), American singer-songwriter
- Kaya Thomas (born 1995), American computer scientist
- Kaya Turski (born 1988), Canadian freestyle skier
- Kaya Wittenburg (born 1972), American model, businessman and actor

== See also ==
- Kaia (name)
- Kaja (name)
- Kaya (surname)
- Kaya (disambiguation)
