= Kayam =

Kayam may refer to:

- Kayam (1982 film), an Indian Malayalam film starring Shankar Panicker and Anjali Naidu
- Kayam (2011 film), an Indian Malayalam film starring Shwetha Menon and Bala
- Hot Springs, Chang Chenmo Valley (called Kayam in Tibetan), location of an Indian border checkpost

== See also ==
- Kaya (disambiguation)
