= Karenni =

Karenni (or Red Karen) may refer to:

- Karenni people
- Karenni language
- Karenni State, former name of Kayah State, Myanmar
- Karenni States, princely states succeeded by Kayah State

== See also ==
- Kayah (disambiguation)
