= Kayah =

Kayah may refer to:

- Kayah (singer), a Polish singer
- Kayah State, a state of Myanmar
- Kayah people, or Karenni people
- Kayah language, or Karenni language
- Kayah Li alphabet

== See also ==
- Kaya (disambiguation)
- Karenni (disambiguation)
- Kayyah, a village in the Liwa Oasis of the UAE
