= USS Plaice =

Submarine of the United States

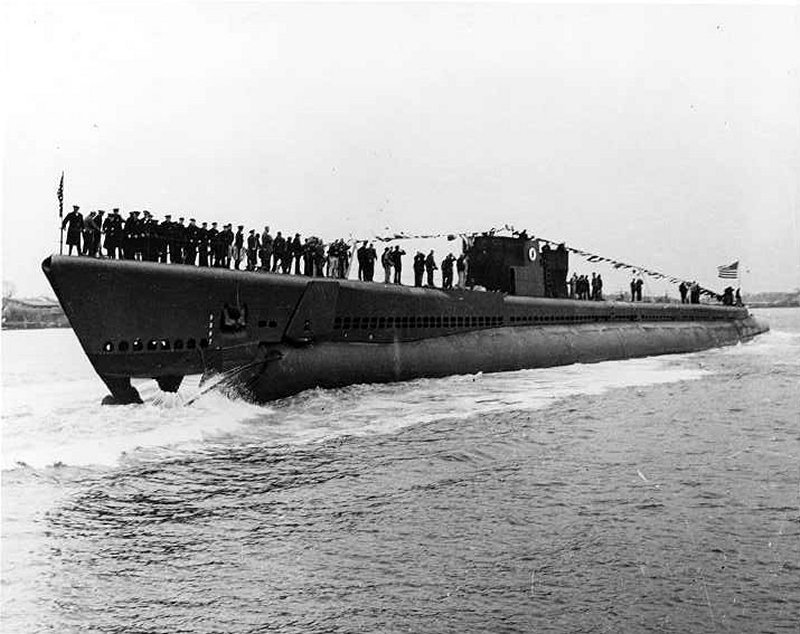
- Plaice is waterborne at Portsmouth Navy Yard, following her launching on 15 November 1943.

History

United States
- Name: USS Plaice (SS-390)
- Builder: Portsmouth Naval Shipyard, Kittery, Maine
- Laid down: 28 June 1943
- Launched: 15 November 1943
- Commissioned: 12 February 1944
- Decommissioned: November 1947
- Recommissioned: 18 May 1963
- Decommissioned: 7 September 1963
- Stricken: 1 April 1973
- Fate: Transferred to Brazil, 7 September 1963

History

Brazil
- Name: Bahia (S-12)
- Acquired: 7 September 1963
- Decommissioned: 19 January 1973
- Fate: Scrapped 1973

General characteristics
- Class & type: Balao-class diesel-electric submarine
- Displacement: 1,526 long tons (1,550 t) surfaced; 2,391 long tons (2,429 t) submerged
- Length: 311 ft 6 in (94.95 m)
- Beam: 27 ft 3 in (8.31 m)
- Draft: 16 ft 10 in (5.13 m) maximum
- Propulsion: 4 × Fairbanks-Morse Model 38D8-⅛ 10-cylinder opposed piston diesel engines driving electrical generators; 2 × 126-cell Sargo batteries; 4 × high-speed Elliott electric motors with reduction gears; two propellers; 5,400 shp (4.0 MW) surfaced; 2,740 shp (2.0 MW) submerged
- Speed: 20.25 knots (38 km/h) surfaced; 8.75 knots (16 km/h) submerged
- Range: 11,000 nautical miles (20,000 km) surfaced at 10 knots (19 km/h)
- Endurance: 48 hours at 2 knots (3.7 km/h) submerged; 75 days on patrol
- Test depth: 400 ft (120 m)
- Complement: 10 officers, 70–71 enlisted
- Armament: 10 × 21-inch (533 mm) torpedo tubes; 6 forward, 4 aft; 24 torpedoes; 1 × 5-inch (127 mm) / 25 caliber deck gun; Bofors 40 mm and Oerlikon 20 mm cannon

USS Plaice (SS-390), a Balao-class submarine, was a ship of the United States Navy named for the plaice, one of the various American flatfish; summer flounder. She participated in the Pacific War campaign of World War II, receiving six battle stars for her service. The United States later transferred her to Brazil in a joint cooperation program.

== Construction and commissioning ==
Plaice was laid down by the Portsmouth Navy Yard, Kittery, Maine, on 14 July 1943; launched on 15 November 1943, sponsored by Miss Eleanor Fazzi; and commissioned on 12 February 1944.

== Service history ==
=== United States Navy ===
Following shakedown and training, Plaice got underway for the Panama Canal Zone on 15 April, and arrived Pearl Harbor on 13 May. She departed on her first war patrol in the Bonin Islands area on 3 June. Plaice torpedoed and sank Hyakufuku Maru on 30 June; Kogi Maru on 5 July; and Submarine Chaser No. 50 on 18 July, before returning to Midway Island.

The submarine was off on her second war patrol on 17 August, this time in the Nansei Shoto area. In the early afternoon on 7 September, Plaice scored one torpedo hit on a Kongō Maru-class liner converted to an auxiliary cruiser. On 24 September, Plaice launched four torpedoes at a Fusō-class battleship, briefly stopping its screws.

Three days later she sank Coast Defense Vessel No. 10., and put three torpedoes into the side of a transport, which blossomed a bright orange flame. The patrol ended as Plaice drew into Midway on 7 October and got underway the following day for Pearl Harbor with Thresher.

Plaice departed Pearl Harbor on 9 November for her third patrol in the Southwestern Japanese Empire off the coast of Shikoku and Kyūshū. On 9 December, she damaged Maki. She patrolled the traffic lanes east of Van Diemen Strait and pulled into Guam 20 December without having sunk any ships on the patrol.

The undersea raider departed Guam on her fourth patrol in the Luzon Straits-Formosa areas. Plaice was part of a coordinated attack group which included Archer-Fish, Batfish, Blackfish, Scabbardfish, and Sea Poacher. This long patrol in the face of enemy antisubmarine measures resulted in but one contact worthy of torpedo fire, a convoy of a small freighter, a medium freighter and three escorts. Three attacks resulted in but one hit. On 23 March 1945, Plaice moored at Midway.

The fifth patrol originated from Midway on 26 April and took Plaice to the Kuril Islands-Okhotsk Sea area. The first enemy contact was made on 13 May, when the submarine trailed four sea trucks and four small luggers until she opened a surface engagement with her 5 in (130 mm) and 40 mm guns, sinking all four sea trucks and two luggers.

When all her larger ammunition had been expended, she drove the remaining two luggers toward the beach and damaged them by 20 mm and small arms fire. On 18 May, seven fishing boats came into view. The staccato of 20 mm and .50 caliber guns tore into two of the boats and damaged them visibly. Plaice ended her patrol at Pearl Harbor 13 June.

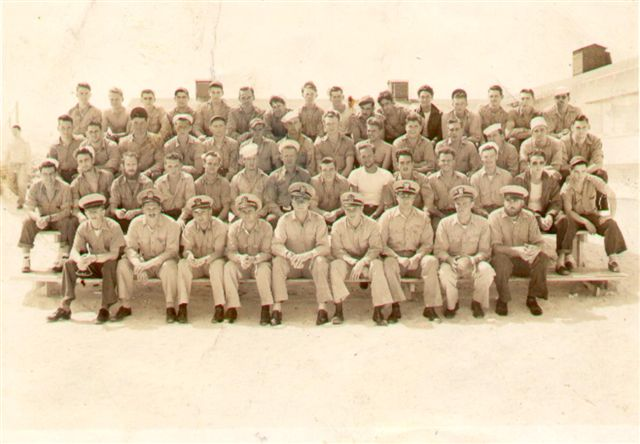
USS Plaice (SS-390) crew

The sixth patrol - commencing on 18 July - took Plaice to the East China Sea area, but she made no enemy contacts. She picked up five survivors from an Army B-25 Mitchell, and transferred them to a Navy patrol bomber the following day. On 15 August, Japan accepted the Potsdam Declaration and nine days later Plaice pulled into Midway.

After the war was over, Plaice operated in the Pacific until, by directive dated November 1947, she was placed out of commission, in reserve, at Mare Island Naval Shipyard. Plaice was reactivated 18 May 1963 in preparation for a five-year loan to Brazil on 7 September 1963 under the Military Assistance Program.

=== Brazilian Navy ===
Capitão-de-Fragata (Commander) Abílio Simões Machado of the Brazilian Navy took command of the submarine at Pearl Harbor, Hawaii, on 7 September 1963. Commissioned in the Brazilian Navy as Bahia (S-12), she was the first Balao-class submarine to undergo alterations at the Brazilian Navy Arsenal in Rio de Janeiro; her hydrodynamic shape was modified with the installation of a new conning tower and periscope guide. After the completion of the modifications, Bahia's underwater speed increased by one knot and she was quieter when submerged.

Bahia took part in UNITAS naval exercises and assisted in surveillance in the South Atlantic Ocean during the Cold War. She logged 140,503 nautical miles (260,212 kilometers), spending 2,863 hours submerged and 836 days at sea. Her loan to Brazil was extended beyond its original five-year term at regular intervals.

Bahia was decommissioned on 19 January 1973. She was sold to the Technology Museum of São Paulo, which intended to tow her to Santos, Brazil, and convert her into a museum ship. However, these plans were not realized, and instead Bahia was scrapped following a ceremony on 27 March 1973.

== Awards ==
Plaice received six battle stars for her World War II service.
