= Nihan Kaya =

Nihan Kaya 1 August 1979 (age 47) is a fiction writer and theorist. She is known for her publications on aesthetic theory and creativity as well as her novels and short stories. She currently teaches in the Psychology Department at MEF University in Istanbul.

Nihan Kaya received the Writers Union of Turkey (Türkiye Yazarlar Birliği) Award for The Sanctuary in 2004.

== Selected list of works ==
=== Non-fiction ===
- 2019 İyi Toplum Yoktur: Günlük Hayatta Toplumun Bireyi İstismar Biçimleri (ISBN 978-605-375-924-9)
- 2018 İyi Aile Yoktur (ISBN 978-605-375-848-8)
- 2013 Yazma Cesareti: Acının Yaratıcılığa Dönüşümü [The Courage to Write: Converting Suffering to Creativity] (ISBN 978-975-539-756-6)
- 2011 Fildişi Kuyu: Psikanalitik Edebiyat Eleştirisi ve Kadın [The Ivory Well: Psychoanalytic Literary Criticism and the Feminine] (ISBN 978-605-5515-49-2) (Collection of academic papers published between 1998-2011)
- 2008 Compelled to Create: The Courage to Go Beyond. (In: Dreaming the Myth Onwards: Revisioning Jungian Therapy and Thought, edited by Lucy Huskinson) (ISBN 978-0-415-43838-4)

=== Fiction ===
- 2017 Kırgınlık [Resentment] (ISBN 978-605-375-708-5)
- 2016 Kar ve İnci [The Snow and the Pearl] (ISBN 978-605-314-106-8)
- 2012 Ama Sizden Değilim [I Am Not One of Us] (ISBN 978-605-4643-13-4)
- 2008 Disparöni [Dyspareunia] (ISBN 978-975-6124-08-6)
- 2006 Buğu [The Mist] (ISBN 975-995-046-4)
- 2004 Çatı Katı [The Sanctuary](ISBN 975-6611-88-X)
- 2003 Gizli Özne [The Hidden Self] (ISBN 975-6611-61-8)
