= Japanese destroyer Kaya (1944) =

Imperial Japanese Navy's Matsu-class destroyer

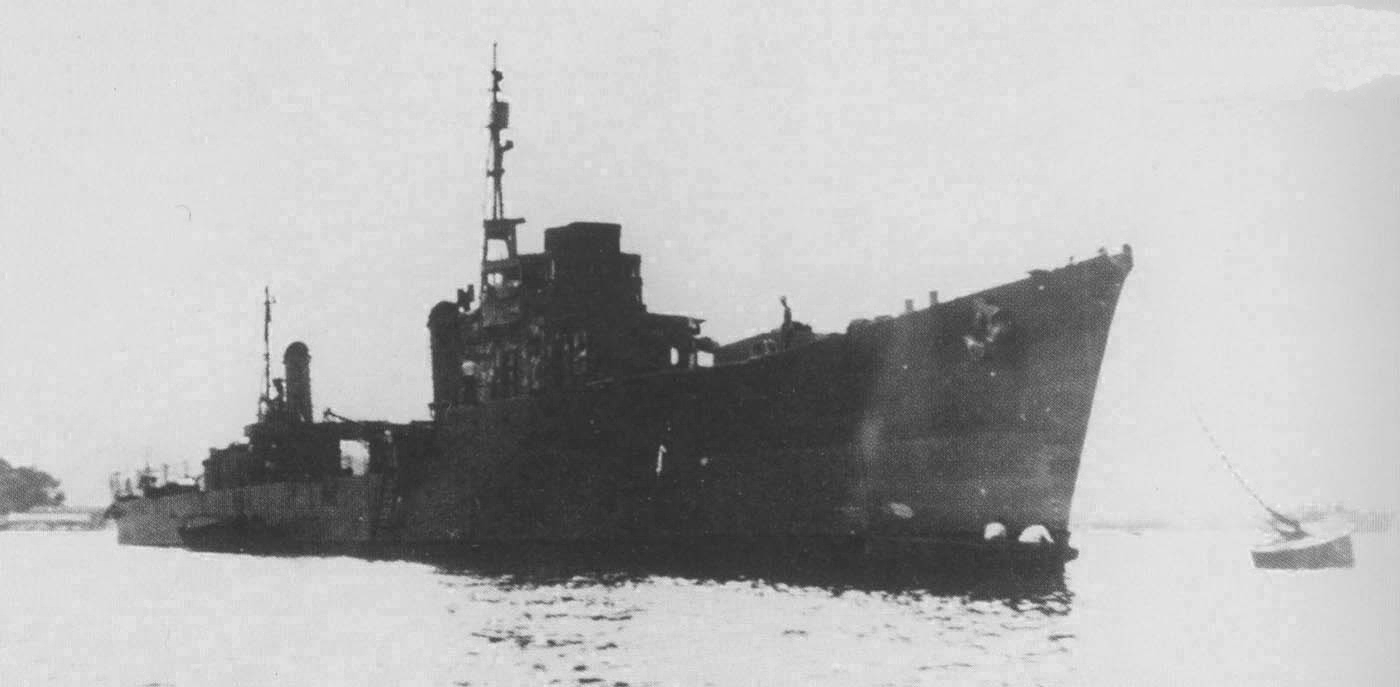
- Kaya after the war in 1945

History

Empire of Japan
- Name: Kaya
- Builder: Maizuru Naval Arsenal
- Laid down: 10 April 1944
- Launched: 30 July 1944
- Completed: 30 September 1944
- Stricken: 5 October 1945
- Fate: Turned over to the Soviet Navy, 5 July 1947

Soviet Union
- Name: Kaya
- Acquired: 5 July 1947
- Commissioned: 7 July 1947
- Renamed: Volevoy (Волевой (Willful)), 22 July 1947; TsL-23, 17 June 1949; OT-61, 10 June 1958
- Reclassified: Target ship, 17 June 1949
- Stricken: 1 August 1959
- Fate: Ordered to be scrapped, 2 September 1959

General characteristics (as built)
- Class & type: Matsu-class escort destroyer
- Displacement: 1,282 t (1,262 long tons) (standard)
- Length: 100 m (328 ft 1 in) (o/a)
- Beam: 9.35 m (30 ft 8 in)
- Draft: 3.3 m (10 ft 10 in)
- Installed power: 2 × water-tube boilers; 19,000 shp (14,000 kW)
- Propulsion: 2 shafts, 2 × geared steam turbines
- Speed: 27.8 knots (51.5 km/h; 32.0 mph)
- Range: 4,680 nmi (8,670 km; 5,390 mi) at 16 knots (30 km/h; 18 mph)
- Complement: 210
- Sensors & processing systems: 1 × Type 22 search radar; 1 × Type 13 early-warning radar
- Armament: 1 × twin, 1 × single 127 mm (5 in) DP guns; 4 × triple, 13 × single 25 mm (1 in) AA guns; 1 × quadruple 610 mm (24 in) torpedo tubes; 2 × rails, 2 × throwers for 36 depth charges

Kaya (榧; "torreya nucifera") was one of 18 Matsu-class escort destroyers built for the Imperial Japanese Navy (IJN) during World War II. Completed in late 1944, the ship began convoy escort duties in October. She was slightly damaged by American aircraft while escorting cruisers on a bombardment mission in the Philippines during Operation Rei in December. Kaya spent the rest of the war escorting convoys and capital ships after repairs.

The ship was surrendered to the Allies at the end of the war and used to repatriate Japanese troops until 1947. Mid-year the destroyer was turned over to the Soviet Union and was commissioned that same year. She was renamed Volevoy (Волевой (Willful)) later that month. When the ship was converted into a target ship in 1949, she was renamed TsL-23. The vessel was hulked in 1958 and ordered to be scrapped the following year.

== Design and description ==
Designed for ease of production, the Matsu class was smaller, slower and more lightly armed than previous destroyers as the IJN intended them for second-line duties like escorting convoys, releasing the larger ships for missions with the fleet. The ships measured 100 meters (328 ft 1 in) long overall, with a beam of 9.35 meters (30 ft 8 in) and a draft of 3.3 meters (10 ft 10 in). Their crew numbered 210 officers and enlisted men. They displaced 1,282 metric tons (1,262 long tons) at standard load and 1,554 metric tons (1,529 long tons) at deep load. The ships had two Kampon geared steam turbines, each driving one propeller shaft using steam provided by two Kampon water-tube boilers. The turbines were rated at a total of 19,000 shaft horsepower (14,000 kW) for a speed of 27.8 knots (51.5 km/h; 32.0 mph). The Matsus had a range of 4,680 nautical miles (8,670 km; 5,390 mi) at 16 knots (30 km/h; 18 mph).

The main armament of the Matsu-class ships consisted of three 127-millimeter (5 in) Type 89 dual-purpose guns in one twin-gun mount aft and one single mount forward of the superstructure. The single mount was partially protected against spray by a gun shield. The accuracy of the Type 89 guns was severely reduced against aircraft because no high-angle gunnery director was fitted. The ships carried a total of twenty-five 25-millimeter (1 in) Type 96 anti-aircraft guns in 4 triple and 13 single mounts. The Matsus were equipped with Type 13 early-warning and Type 22 surface-search radars. The ships were also armed with a single rotating quadruple mount amidships for 610-millimeter (24 in) torpedoes. They could deliver their 36 depth charges via two stern rails and two throwers.

== Construction and career ==
Authorized in the late 1942 Modified 5th Naval Armaments Supplement Program, Kaya was laid down on 10 April 1944 at the Maizuru Naval Arsenal and launched on 30 July. Upon her completion on 30 September, Kaya was assigned to Destroyer Squadron 11 of the Combined Fleet for training. The ship escorted her first convoy to and from Taiwan during 25 October–18 November. She was assigned to Destroyer Division 43, Escort Squadron 31 of the 5th Fleet a week later. That same day Kaya escorted a convoy to Manila, the Philippines, via Taiwan, arriving at the former port on 11 December. The following day the ship sailed for Cam Ranh Bay in occupied French Indochina to participate in Operation Rei, an attack on the American forces at San Jose on the island of Mindoro. Five destroyers, including Kaya, escorted two cruisers that departed on 24 December. They were attacked by American aircraft late the next day; the ship was lightly damaged by strafing aircraft.

Kaya arrived in Takao, Taiwan, on 7 January 1945 and continued onwards to Maizuru, Japan, where she was docked for repairs six days later. On 5 February Escort Squadron 31 was transferred to the Combined Fleet. The ship arrived in Kure on 2 March and remained in the Seto Inland Sea for the rest of the war. The squadron was reassigned to the 2nd Fleet from 15 March to 20 April and then rejoined the Combined Fleet. On 6 April, Kaya helped to escort the battleship Yamato through the Inland Sea. The ship was turned over to Allied forces at Kure at the time of the surrender of Japan on 2 September and was stricken from the navy list on 5 October. The destroyer was disarmed and used to repatriate Japanese personnel in 1945–1947. Kaya was turned over to the Soviet Union on 5 July of the latter year.

The ship was commissioned into the Soviet Navy's Fifth Fleet two days later and was renamed Volevoy on 22 July 1947. The ship was placed in reserve on 14 February 1949. She was disarmed, converted into a target ship and renamed TsL-23 on 17 June. The ship was transferred to the Pacific Fleet on 23 April 1953. She was hulked and renamed OT-61 on 10 June 1958, stricken from the navy list on 1 August 1959 and ordered to be scrapped on 2 September.

== Bibliography ==
- Berezhnoy, Sergey (1994). Трофеи и репарации ВМФ СССР [Trophies and Reparations of the Soviet Navy] (in Russian). Yakutsk: Sakhapoligrafizdat. OCLC 33334505.
- Dodson, Aidan & Cant, Serena (2020). Spoils of War: The Fate of Enemy Fleets after Two World Wars. Barnsley, UK: Seaforth Publishing. ISBN 978-1-5267-4198-1.
- Jentschura, Hansgeorg; Jung, Dieter & Mickel, Peter (1977). Warships of the Imperial Japanese Navy, 1869–1945. Annapolis, Maryland: United States Naval Institute. ISBN 0-87021-893-X.
- Nevitt, Allyn D. (1998). "IJN Kaya: Tabular Record of Movement". www.combinedfleet.com.
- Rohwer, Jürgen (2005). Chronology of the War at Sea 1939–1945: The Naval History of World War Two (Third Revised ed.). Annapolis, Maryland: Naval Institute Press. ISBN 1-59114-119-2.
- Stille, Mark (2013). Imperial Japanese Navy Destroyers 1919–45 (2): Asahio to Tachibana Classes. Botley, UK: Osprey Publishing. ISBN 978-1-84908-987-6.
- Sturton, Ian (1980). "Japan". In Chesneau, Roger (ed.). Conway's All the World's Fighting Ships 1922–1946. Greenwich, UK: Conway Maritime Press. ISBN 0-85177-146-7.
- Whitley, M. J. (1988). Destroyers of World War Two: An International Encyclopedia. Annapolis, Maryland: Naval Institute Press. ISBN 0-87021-326-1.
