= Arare =

Arare may refer to:

- Arare (food), a bite-sized Japanese rice cracker
- Japanese destroyer Arare, a warship sunk in 1942
- Norimaki Arare or Arale Norimaki, the main character in Dr. Slump media
