= Japanese battleship Kongō =

Kongō-class Japanese warship

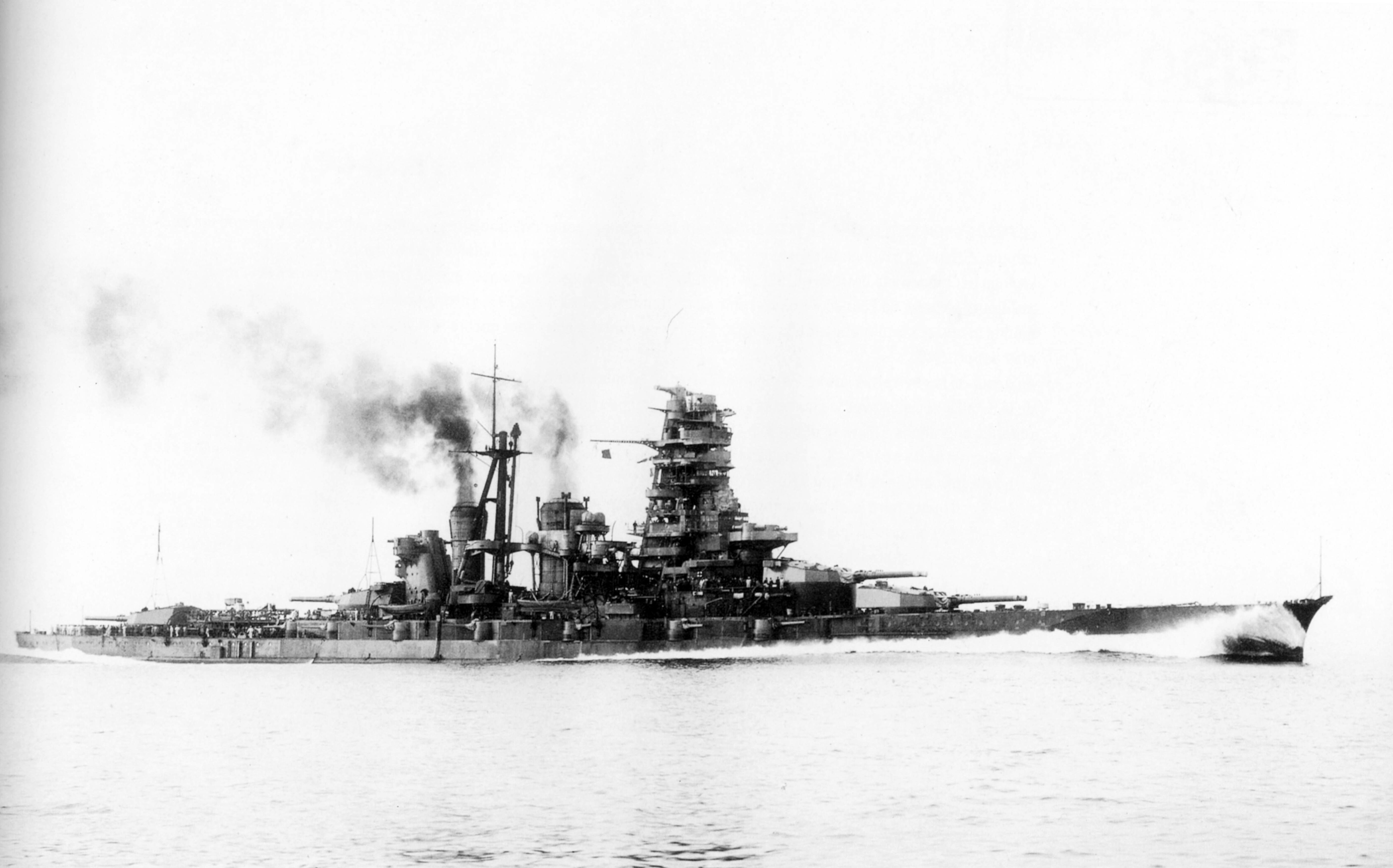
- Kongō on sea trials, off the coast of Tateyama, 14 November 1936

History

Empire of Japan
- Name: Kongō
- Namesake: Mount Kongō
- Ordered: 1911
- Builder: Vickers Shipbuilding Company, Barrow-in-Furness
- Laid down: 17 January 1911
- Launched: 18 May 1912
- Commissioned: 16 August 1913
- Stricken: 20 January 1945
- Fate: Sunk in the Formosa Strait, 21 November 1944 (26°09′N 121°23′E)

General characteristics
- Class & type: Kongō-class battlecruiser
- Displacement: 36,600 long tons (37,187 t)
- Length: 222 m (728 ft 4 in)
- Beam: 31 m (101 ft 8 in)
- Draught: 9.7 m (31 ft 10 in)
- Propulsion: Steam turbines, 4 shafts
- Speed: 27.5 knots (31.6 mph; 50.9 km/h)
- Range: 10,000 nmi (19,000 km) at 14 kn (26 km/h)
- Complement: 1,360
- Armament: 1913: 8 × 356 mm (14 in) naval gun (4×2); 16 × 6-inch (15 cm) 50 caliber naval guns (16×1); 16 × 76 mm (3 in) naval guns (8×1); 4 × 6.5 mm (0.26 in) machine gun; 1944: 8 × 356 mm (14 in) naval gun (4×2); 8 × 152 mm (6 in) naval gun (8×1); 12 × 127 mm (5.0 in) guns (6×2); 100 × 25 mm Type 96 antiaircraft autocannon (15×3,8×2,40×1)
- Armor: Waterline belt: 203 mm (8 in); Deck: 38–58 mm (1.5–2.3 in) (later strengthened); Gun turrets: 229 mm (9 in); Barbettes: 254 mm (10 in)

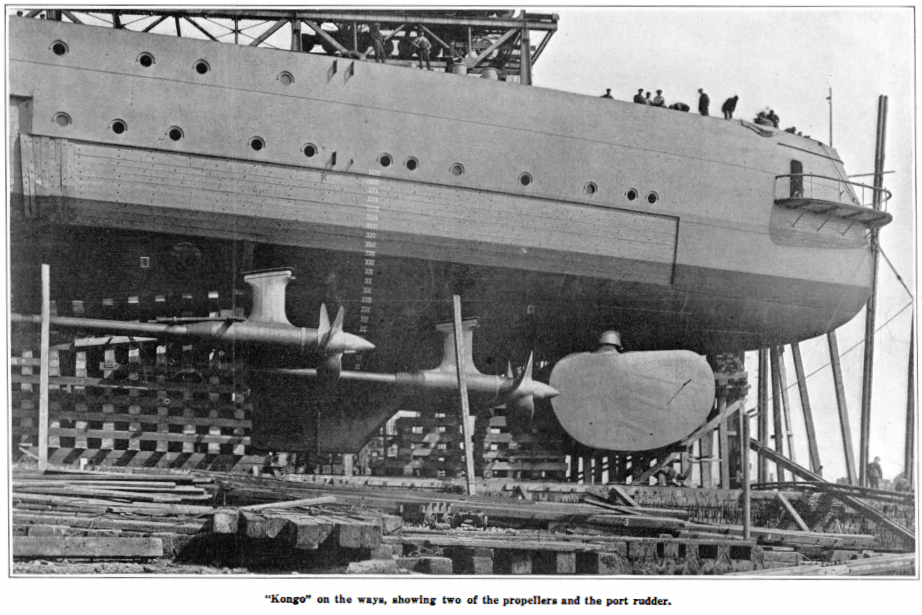
Kongō on the ways at Barrow, showing two of the propellers and the port rudder, Scientific American, 1913

Kongō (Japanese: 金剛; named after Mount Kongō) was a warship of the Imperial Japanese Navy during World Wars I and II. She was the first battlecruiser of the Kongō class, among the most heavily armed ships in any navy when built. Her designer was British naval engineer George Thurston, and she was laid down in 1911 at Barrow-in-Furness in Britain by Vickers Shipbuilding Company. Kongō was the last Japanese capital ship constructed outside Japan. She was commissioned formally in 1913 and patrolled off the Chinese coast during World War I.

Kongō underwent two major reconstructions. Beginning in 1929, the Imperial Japanese Navy (IJN) rebuilt her as a battleship, strengthening her armor and improving her speed and power capabilities. In 1935, her superstructure was completely rebuilt, her speed was increased, and she was equipped with launch catapults for floatplanes. Now fast enough to accompany Japan's growing carrier fleet, Kongō was reclassified as a fast battleship. During the Second Sino-Japanese War, Kongō operated off the coast of mainland China before being redeployed to the Third Battleship Division in 1941. In 1942, she sailed as part of the Southern Force in preparation for the Battle of Singapore.

Kongō fought in many major naval actions of the Pacific War during World War II. She covered the Japanese Army's amphibious landings in British Malaya (part of present-day Malaysia) and the Dutch East Indies (now Indonesia) in 1942, before engaging American forces at the Battle of Midway and during the Guadalcanal campaign. Throughout 1943, Kongō primarily remained at Truk Lagoon in the Caroline Islands, Kure Naval Base (near Hiroshima), Sasebo Naval Base (near Nagasaki), and Lingga Roads, and deployed several times in response to American aircraft carrier air raids on Japanese island bases scattered across the Pacific. Kongō participated in the Battle of the Philippine Sea (19-20 June) and the Battle of Leyte Gulf in 1944 (22–23 October), sinking the destroyer escort USS Samuel B. Roberts and helping to cripple the destroyer USS Heermann in the latter engagement. Kongō was torpedoed and sunk by the submarine USS Sealion while transiting the Formosa Strait on 21 November 1944. She was the only Japanese battleship sunk by a submarine in the Second World War. (Note: Shinano was laid down as a Yamato-class battleship, but by the time of her sinking by USS Archerfish, she had been completed as an aircraft carrier.)

== Design and construction ==
Kongō was the first of the IJN's Kongō-class battlecruisers, which were almost as large, costly, and well-armed as battleships, but traded off armored protection for higher speeds. These were designed by British naval engineer George Thurston and were ordered in 1910 in the Japanese Emergency Naval Expansion Bill after the commissioning of HMS Invincible in 1908. These four battlecruisers of the Kongō class were designed to match the naval capabilities of the battlecruisers of the other major naval powers at the time, and they have been called the battlecruiser versions of the British (formerly Turkish) battleship HMS Erin. Their heavy armament of 14-inch naval guns and their armor protection (which took up about 23.3% of their roughly 30,000-ton displacements in 1913) were greatly superior to those of any other Japanese capital ship afloat at the time.

The keel of Kongō was laid down at Barrow-in-Furness by Vickers Shipbuilding and Engineering on 17 January 1911. Under Japan's contract with Vickers, the first vessel of the class was constructed in the United Kingdom, with the remainder built in Japan. Kongō was launched on 18 May 1912 and then transferred to the dockyards of Portsmouth, England, where her fitting-out began in mid-1912. All parts used in her construction were manufactured in the U.K. Kongō was completed on 16 April 1913.

=== Siemens-Vickers Scandal ===
In January 1914, a telegram leaked from German industrial conglomerate Siemens' Tokyo office to Reuters along with further reporting by The New York Times and The Asahi Shimbun led to an investigation by Japanese authorities, which revealed a pattern of bribery and kickbacks by German and English armaments corporations. Siemens had been paying senior Japanese officials a secret 15% kickback, until British company Vickers had outbid them by offering 25%. Vickers had paid 210,000 yen to Admiral Fuji of the IJN procurement in 1911 and 1912, and 40,000 yen to Vice Admiral Matsumoto Kazu, related to obtaining the contract for building Kongō. Kazu was court-martialed in May 1914, fined 400,000 yen, and sentenced to 3 years in prison. As a result of the Siemens-Vickers scandal revolving around the contracts for building Kongō, the government of Prime Minister Yamamoto Gonnohyōe resigned March 23, 1914. Senior executives of Mitsui corporation, Japanese partners of Vickers, also resigned.

=== Armament ===
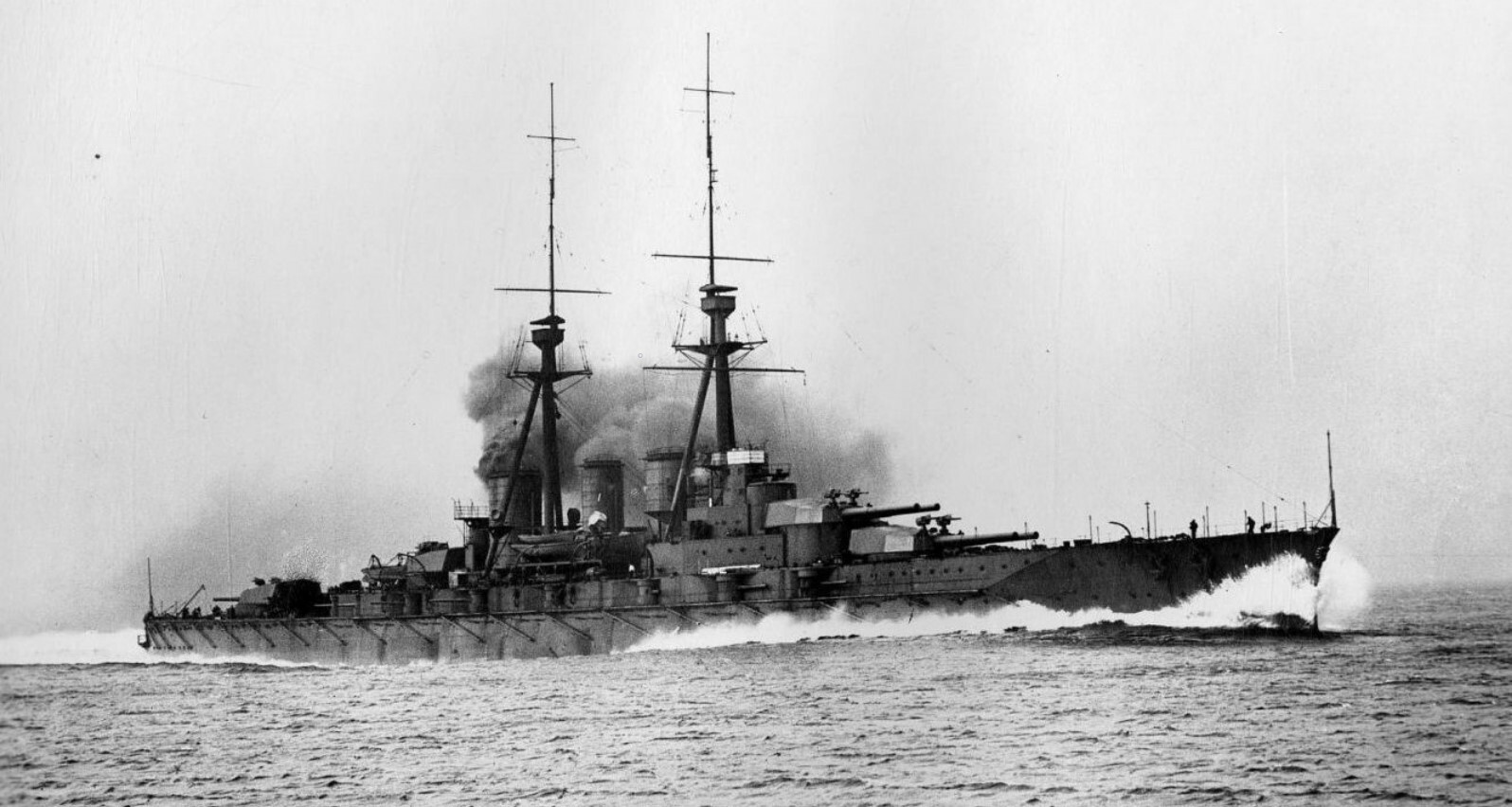
Kongō on full-power trials 8 May 1913

Originally, Kongō's main battery was designed to consist of ten 12-inch (305 mm) main guns. Her builders, Vickers, convinced the Japanese to go with a larger weapon, though, after Kongō was laid down. Because of this, Kongō's main armament as built consisted of eight Vickers 14 inch (356 mm)/45 naval gun heavy-caliber main naval guns in four twin turrets (two forward and two aft), making her the most powerfully armed capital ship when she was commissioned. The turrets were noted by the U.S. Office of Naval Intelligence to be "similar to the British 15-inch turrets", with improvements made in flash-tightness. Each of her main guns could fire high explosive or armor-piercing shells 38,770 yards (19.14 nmi; 35.45 km) at a rate of about two shells per minute. In keeping with the Japanese doctrine of deploying more powerful vessels before their opponents, Kongō and her sister ships were the first vessels in the world equipped with 14-inch (356 mm) guns. Her main guns carried ammunition for 90 shots, and they had an approximate barrel lifetime of 250 to 280 shots. In 1941, separate dyes were introduced for the armor-piercing shells of the four Kongō-class battleships to assist with targeting, with Kongō's armor-piercing shells using red dye.

The secondary battery of Kongō originally consisted of sixteen 6-inch (152 mm) 50-calibre guns in single casemates located amidships ("50-calibre" means that the lengths of the guns were 50 times their bore, or 300 inches), sixteen 3-inch (76 mm) guns, and eight submerged 21-inch (533 mm) torpedo tubes. Her 6-inch naval guns could fire five to six rounds per minute, with a barrel lifetime around 500 rounds. The 6-inch/50-calibre gun was capable of firing both antiaircraft and antiship shells, though the positioning of these guns on Kongō made antiaircraft firing mostly impractical. During her second reconstruction, the older three-inch guns were removed and then replaced with eight 5-inch (127 mm) 40-calibre, dual-purpose guns. These guns could fire from eight to 14 rounds per minute, with a barrel lifetime between 800 and 1,500 rounds. Of Kongō's guns, the 5-inch guns had the widest variety of shell types: antiaircraft, antiship, and illumination shells. Kongō was also armed with many 1-inch (25 mm) antiaircraft machine guns. By October 1944, Kongō's secondary armament was reconfigured to eight 6-inch (152 mm) guns, eight 5-inch (127 mm) guns, and 122 Type 96 antiaircraft rapid-fire cannons.

=== Armor ===
Being a battlecruiser, Kongō's armor was fairly thin. She was equipped with a 6- to 8-inch (152–203 mm) main belt. Kongō deck armor consisted of armor plating ranging from 1-inch (25 mm), 1.5-inches (38 mm), to 2.75-inches (7 cm), depending on the area. She was equipped with 9-inch (229 mm) barbette armor protecting the ammunition to her main guns, as well as turret armor consisting of 10-inch (254 mm) turret faces, and 9-inch (229 mm) plating over the sides and rear.

== Service history ==
=== 1913–1929: Battlecruiser ===
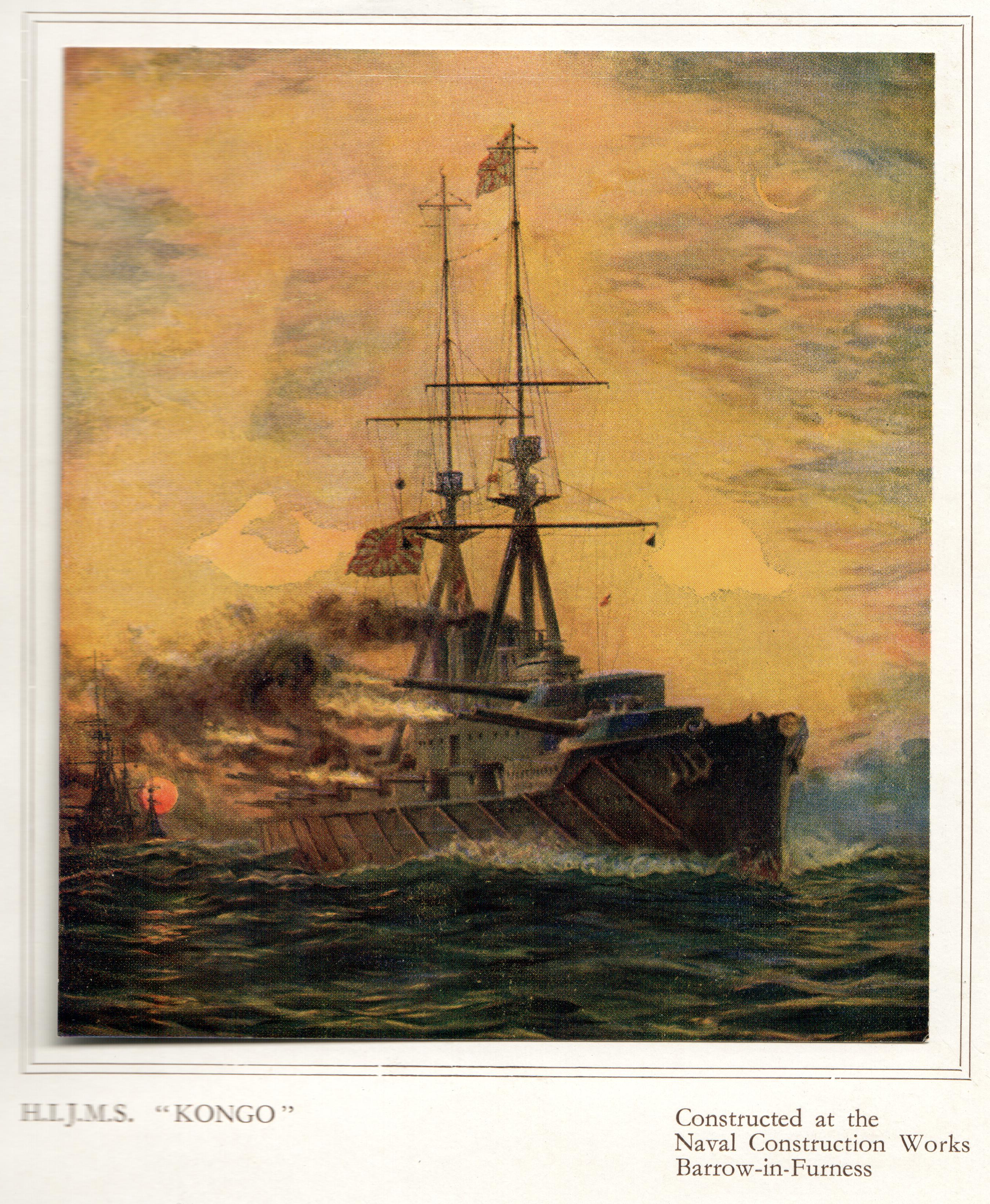
Japanese battlecruiser Kongo as first built

On 16 August 1913, Kongō was completed and commissioned into the IJN; 12 days later, she departed from Portsmouth headed for Japan. She was docked at Singapore from 20 to 27 October, before arriving at Yokosuka Naval Arsenal on 5 November, where she was placed in first reserve. In January 1914, she docked at Kure Naval Base for armament checks. On 3 August 1914, the German Empire declared war on France and then invaded via Belgium, sparking the beginning of World War I in the West. Twelve days later, Japan issued a warning to Kaiser Wilhelm II of the German Empire, ordering him to withdraw the German troops from their base at Qingdao, China. When the German Empire did not respond, Japan declared war on Germany on 23 August, occupying the former German possessions in the Caroline Islands, Palau Islands, Marshall Islands, and Marianas Islands. Kongō was quickly deployed towards the Central Pacific to patrol the sea lines of communication of the German Empire. Kongō returned to the port of Yokosuka, Japan, on 12 September, and one month later, she was assigned to the First Battleship Division. In October, Kongō and her new sister ship Hiei sortied off the Chinese coast in support of Japanese army units during the Siege of Tsingtao. Then, Kongō returned to Sasebo Naval Base for upgrades to her searchlights. On 3 October 1915, Kongō and Hiei participated in the sinking of the old Imperator Nikolai I as a practice target. She was a Russian predreadnought that had been captured in 1905 during the Russo-Japanese War that had next served as an IJN warship. With the defeat of the German East Asia Squadron by the Royal Navy at the Battle of the Falkland Islands in December 1914, the need for IJN operations in the Pacific Ocean was greatly reduced. Kongō spent the rest of World War I either based at Sasebo or on patrol off the coast of China. In December 1918, following the end of the hostilities of World War I, Kongō was placed in "second reserve". In April 1919, she was fitted with a new seawater flooding system for her ammunition magazines.

With the conclusion of World War I and the signing of the Washington Naval Treaty on 6 February 1922, the size of the IJN was significantly limited, with a ratio of 5:5:3 required between the capital ships of the United Kingdom, the United States, and the Japanese Empire, since the last was responsible for only one ocean, rather than the two of the other countries, and fewer warships for France and Italy. This treaty also banned the signatories from building any new capital ships until 1931, with no capital ship permitted to exceed 35,000 long tons (36,000 t) in displacement. Provided that new additions did not exceed 3,000 tons of displacement, the existing capital ships were allowed to be upgraded with improved antitorpedo bulges and armored main decks. By the time that the Washington Naval Treaty had been fully implemented in Japan, only three classes of World War I-type capital ships remained active - the Ise-class battleships, the Kongō-class battlecruisers, and the Fusō-class battleships.

In April 1923, Kongō gave transportation to Crown Prince Hirohito during his official visit to the Japanese possession of Taiwan. On 14 June 1924, she collided with Submarine No. 62 during maneuvers. In November 1924, Kongō docked at Yokosuka, where modifications were made to her main armament, increasing the elevation of her main guns and improving her fire-control systems. In 1927, Kongō underwent major modifications to her superstructure, rebuilding it into the pagoda mast style to accommodate the growing number of fire-control systems for her main guns. In May 1928, her steering equipment was upgraded, before she was placed in reserve in preparation for major modifications and reconstruction in 1929–31.

=== 1929–1935: Reconstruction into battleship ===
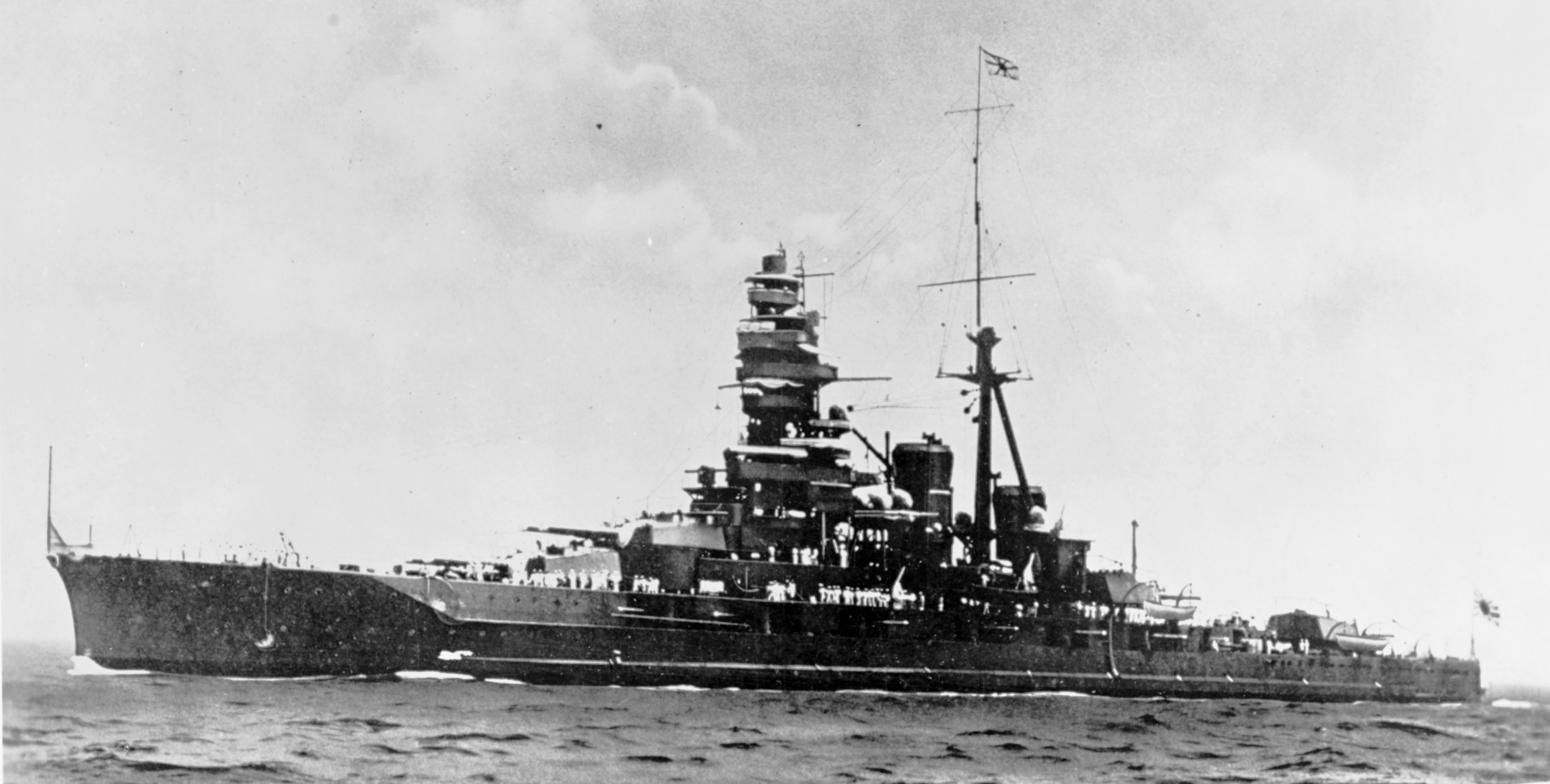
Kongō in 1931, following her first reconstruction

Prohibited by the Washington Treaty from constructing new capital ships until 1931, Japan resorted to upgrading their World War I-era battleships and battlecruisers. Beginning in September 1929, Kongō underwent extensive modernization and modification in drydock at Yokosuka Naval Arsenal. Over the next two years, Kongō's horizontal armor near her ammunition magazines was strengthened, and the machinery spaces within the hull were given increased torpedo protection. Antitorpedo bulges were added along her waterline, as permitted by the Washington Treaty. She was refitted to accommodate three Type 90 Model 0 floatplanes, though no aircraft catapults were fitted. To increase her speed and power, all 36 of her Yarrow boilers were removed, and then replaced with 16 newer boilers, and Brown-Curtis direct-drive turbines were installed. Kongō's forward funnel was removed, and her second funnel was enlarged and lengthened. The modifications to her hull increased her armor weight from 6,502 to 10,313 long tons, directly violating the terms of the Washington Naval Treaty. In March 1931, Kongō was reclassified as a battleship.

On 22 April 1930, Japan signed the London Naval Treaty, placing further restrictions on the signatories' naval forces. Several of her older battleships were scrapped, and no new capital ships were built as replacements. After minor fitting-out work, Kongō's reconstruction begun in September 1929 and was declared complete on 31 March 1931. On 1 December 1931, two months after the Japanese invasion of Manchuria, Kongō was assigned to the First Battleship Division and also designated the flagship of the Combined Fleet. Additional rangefinders and searchlights were fitted to her superstructure in January 1932, and Captain Nobutake Kondō assumed command of the vessel in December. In 1933, aircraft catapults were fitted between the two rear turrets.

On 25 February 1933, following a report by the Lytton Commission, the League of Nations agreed that Japan's invasion of China had violated Chinese sovereignty. Refusing to accept the judgement of this organization, Japan withdrew from the League of Nations on the same day. Japan also immediately withdrew from the Washington Naval Treaty and the London Naval Treaty, thus removing all restrictions on the numbers and sizes of her capital warships. In November 1934, Kongō was placed in second reserve in preparation for further modifications. On 10 January 1935, Kongō was toured by the Nazi German naval attaché to Japan, Captain Paul Wenneker, as part of a gunnery demonstration.

=== 1935–1941: Fast battleship ===
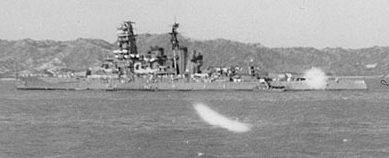
Kongō off the coast of Amoy (present day Xiamen) in 1938

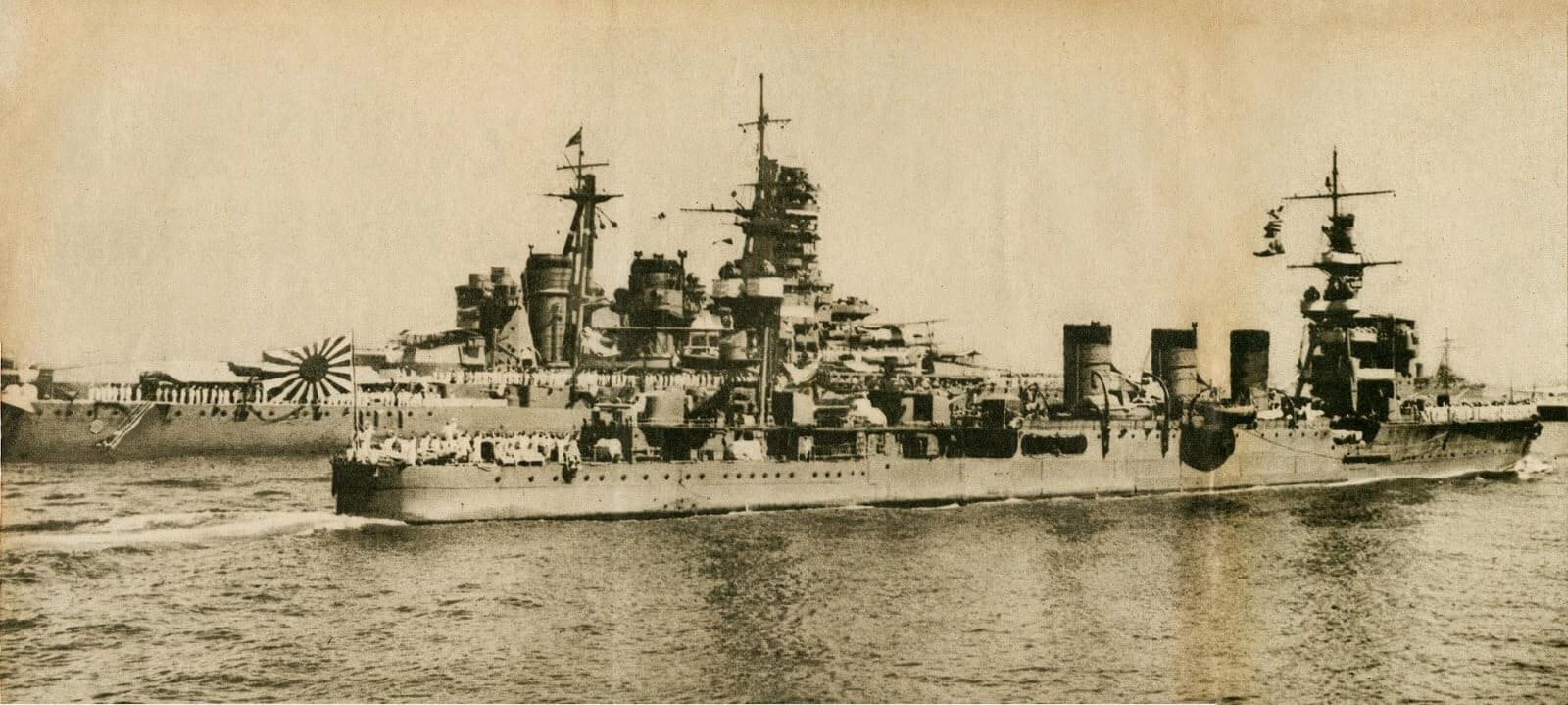
Kongō and the light cruiser Ōi departing Sasebo for eastern China, 10 August 1937

On 1 June 1935, Kongō was dry-docked at Yokosuka Naval Arsenal in preparation for upgrades that would enable her to escort Japan's growing fleet of aircraft carriers. Her stern was lengthened by 26 feet (7.9 m) to improve her fineness ratio and her 16 older boilers were removed and then replaced with 11 oil-fired Kampon boilers and newer geared turbines. In addition, her bridge was completely reconstructed according to Japan's pagoda mast-style of forward superstructure, and catapults were added to support three Nakajima E8N or Kawanishi E7K reconnaissance and spotter floatplanes.

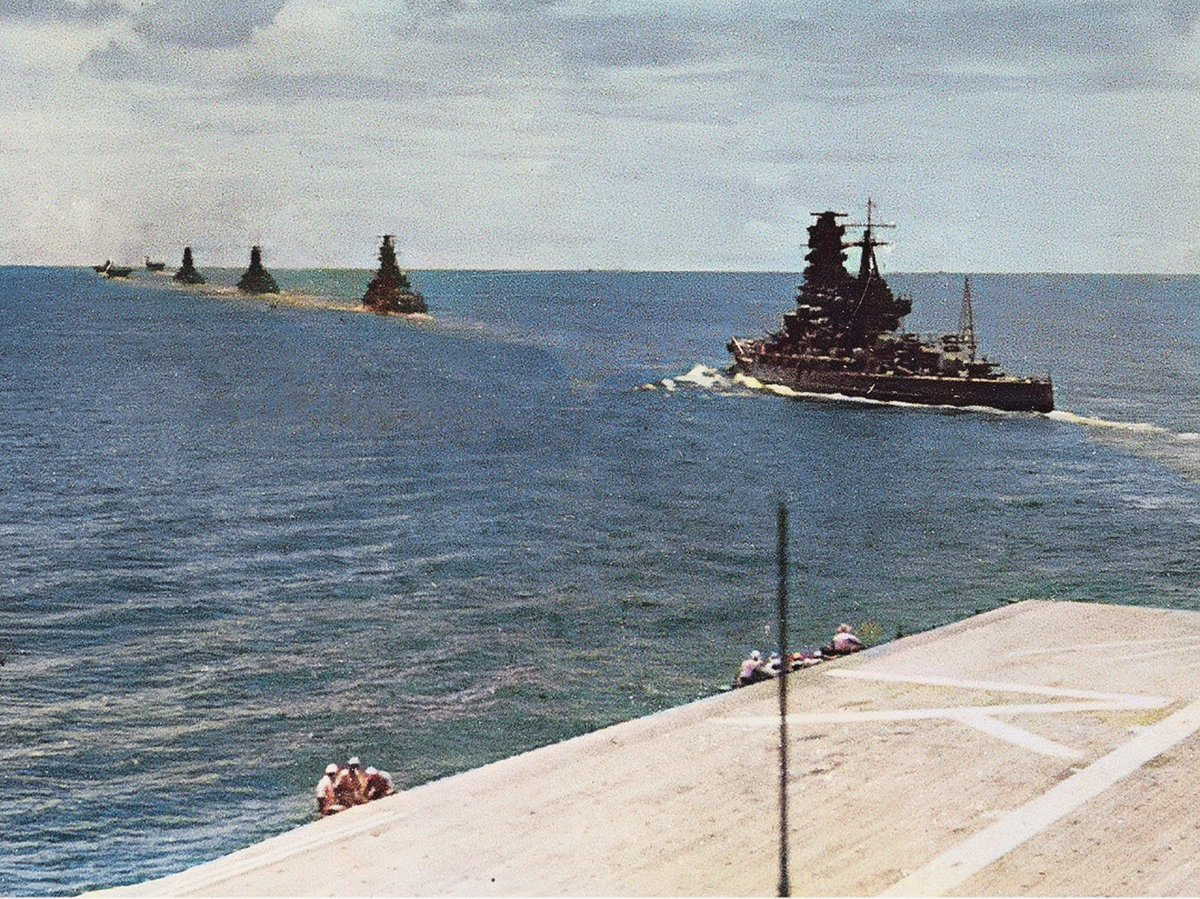
A view taken from the aircraft carrier Zuikaku, 30 March 1942. Kongō is closest to the camera, following Haruna, Kirishima, and Hiei.

Kongō's armor was also extensively upgraded. Her main belt was strengthened to a uniform thickness of 8 inches (up from varying thicknesses of 6 to 8 inches), and also diagonal bulkheads of depths ranging from 5 to 8 inches (127 to 203 mm) were added to reinforce the main armored belt. The turret armor was strengthened to 10 inches (254 mm), while 4 inches (102 mm) were added to portions of the deck armor. Kongō's ammunition magazine protection was also strengthened to 4.0 inches (10 cm). This reconstruction was finished on 8 January 1937. Capable of greater than 30 knots (56 km/h), despite the significant increase in her hull displacement, Kongō was now reclassified as a fast battleship. Despite this reclassification, however, Kongō could still very much be considered a battlecruiser in nature. Kongō still only carried an 8-inch (203 mm) belt, 9-inch (229 mm) barbettes, and 10-inch (254 mm) turret armor, none of which was enough to stop even her own 14-inch (356 mm) guns.

In February 1937, Kongō was assigned to the Sasebo Naval District, and in December, she was placed under the command of Takeo Kurita in the Third Battleship Division. In April 1938, two float planes from Kongō bombed the Chinese city of Fuzhou during the Second Sino-Japanese War. Throughout 1938 and 1939, Kongō steamed off the Chinese coast in support of Japanese Army operations during the war. In November 1939, Captain Raizo Tanaka assumed command of Kongō. From November 1940 to April 1941, additional armor was added to Kongō's armament barbettes and ammunition tubes, while ventilation and firefighting equipment were also improved. In August 1941, she was assigned to the Third Battleship Division under the command of Vice Admiral Gunichi Mikawa alongside her fully modified sister warships Hiei, Kirishima and Haruna.

=== 1942: Pacific War service ===
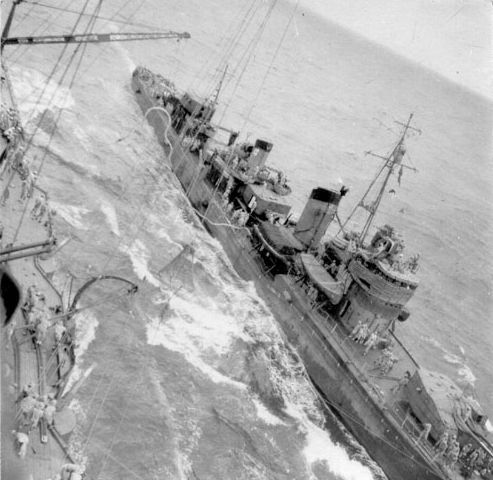
Kongo refueling the destroyer Arare during the Indian Ocean Raid, 7 April 1942

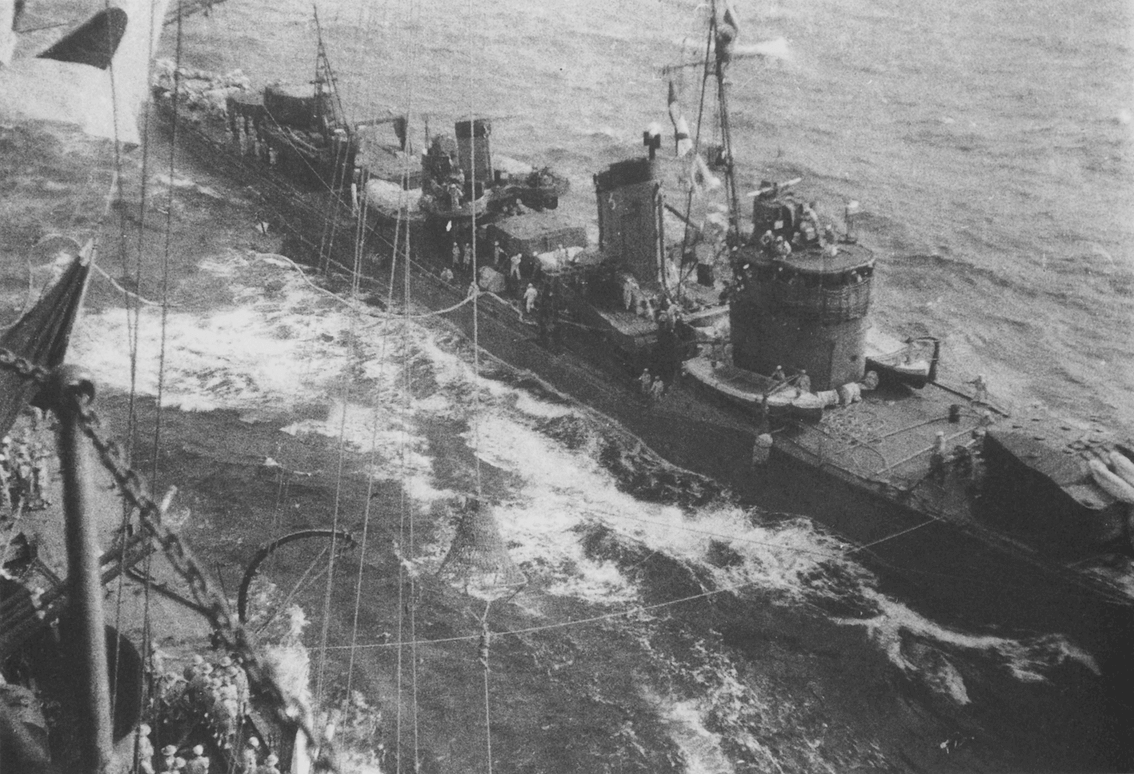
Kongo refueling the destroyer Shiranui during the Indian Ocean Raid, 7 April 1942

Kongō and Haruna departed from the Hashirajima fleet anchorage on 29 November 1941 to begin the War in the Pacific as part of the Southern (Malay) Force's Main Body, under the overall command of Vice Admiral Nobutake Kondō. On 4 December 1941, the Main Body arrived off the coast of southern Thailand and northern Malaya in preparation for the invasion of Thailand and the Malayan Peninsula four days later. When Britain's "Force Z"—consisting of the battleship Prince of Wales and the battlecruiser Repulse—was quickly defeated by Japan's land-based aircraft from southern Vietnam, Kongō's battlegroup withdrew from Malayan waters. This battlegroup subsequently sortied from Indochina for three days in mid-December to protect a reinforcement convoy traveling to Malaya and again on 18 December to cover the Japanese Army's landing at Lingayen Gulf, Luzon, in the Philippines. The Main Body departed Cam Ranh Bay in French Indochina on 23 December bound for Taiwan, arriving two days later. In January 1942, Kongō and the heavy cruisers Takao and Atago provided distant cover for air attacks on Ambon Island.

On 21 February, Kongō was joined by Haruna, four fast aircraft carriers, five heavy cruisers, and numerous support ships in preparation for Operation J, Japan's invasion of the Dutch East Indies. On 25 February, the Third Battleship Division provided cover for air attacks on the island of Java. Kongō bombarded Christmas Island off the western coast of Australia on 7 March 1942, and then she returned to Staring-baai for 15 days of standby alert. In April 1942, Kongō joined five fleet carriers in attacks on Colombo and Trincomalee on Ceylon. Following the destruction of the British heavy cruisers HMS Dorsetshire and HMS Cornwall on 5 April 1942, this naval task force moved southwest to locate the remainder of the British Eastern Fleet, then under the command of Admiral James Somerville. On 7 April, the Japanese oil tankers were a ways off from the main formation, resulting in Kongō refueling multiple destroyers, photographing Arare and Shiranui being refueled. On 9 April, one of Haruna's reconnaissance seaplanes spotted the aircraft carrier HMS Hermes south of Trincomalee. On the same day, Japanese air attacks sank the carrier, and Kongō was attacked but missed by nine British medium bombers. Having crippled the offensive capability of Britain's Eastern Fleet, the Third Battleship Division returned to Japan. Kongō reached Sasebo on 22 April. From 23 April to 2 May, Kongō was drydocked at Sasebo for reconfiguration of her antiaircraft armament.

On 27 May 1942, Kongō sortied with Hiei and the heavy cruisers Atago, Chōkai, Myōkō, and Haguro as part of Admiral Nobutake Kondō's invasion force during the Battle of Midway. Following the disastrous loss of four of the Combined Fleet's fast carriers on 4 June 1942, Kondō's force withdrew to Japan. On 14 July she was assigned as the flagship of the restructured Third Battleship Division. In August, Kongō was drydocked at Kure to receive surface-detection radar and additional range finders. In September, Kongō embarked with Hiei, Haruna, Kirishima, three carriers, and numerous smaller warships in response to the U.S. Marine Corps's amphibious landing on Guadalcanal in the Solomon Islands. On 20 September, this task force was ordered to return to the Truk Naval Base in the Central Pacific north of the equator.

In the aftermath of the Battle of Cape Esperance, the Japanese Army opted to reinforce its troops on Guadalcanal. To protect their transport convoy from enemy air attack, Admiral Isoroku Yamamoto sent Haruna and Kongō, escorted by one light cruiser and nine destroyers, to bombard the American air base at Henderson Field. Because of their high speeds, these two battleships could bombard the airfield and then withdraw before being subjected to air attack from either land-based warplanes or American aircraft carriers. On the night of 13–14 October, these two battleships shelled the area of Henderson Field from a distance of about 16,000 yards (15,000 m), firing 973 14-inch high-explosive shells. In the most successful Japanese battleship action of the war, the bombardment heavily damaged both runways, destroyed almost all of the U.S. Marines' aviation fuel, destroyed or damaged 48 of the Marines' 90 warplanes, and killed 41 marines. A large Japanese troop and supply convoy reached Guadalcanal on the next day.

During the Battle of the Santa Cruz Islands on 26 October 1942, Kongō was attacked by four Grumman TBF Avenger torpedo bombers, but she received no hits. In mid-November, this battleship and other warships provided distant cover for the unsuccessful mission by the IJN to bombard Henderson Field again and to deliver more Army reinforcements to Guadalcanal. On 15 November 1942, following the Japanese defeat and the sinking of Hiei and Kirishima during the Naval Battle of Guadalcanal, the Third Battleship Division returned to Truk, where it remained for the rest of 1942.

=== 1943: Movement between bases ===
Throughout 1943, Kongō engaged no enemy targets. In late January 1943, she participated in Operation Ke as part of a diversionary and distant covering force to support IJN destroyers that were evacuating Army troops from Guadalcanal. From 15 through 20 February 1943, the Third Battleship Division was transferred from Truk to the Kure Naval Base. On 27 February, Kongō was drydocked to receive upgrades to her antiaircraft armament, with the additions of two triple 25 mm gun mounts and the removal of two of her 6-inch turrets, while additional concrete protection was added near her steering gear. On 17 May 1943, in response to the U.S. Army's invasion of Attu Island, Kongō sortied alongside the battleship Musashi, the Third Battleship Division, two fleet carriers, two cruisers, and nine destroyers. Three days later, the American submarine USS Sawfish spotted this naval task force, but she was unable to attack it. On 22 May 1943, the task force arrived at Yokosuka, where it was joined by an additional three fleet carriers and two light cruisers. This force was disbanded when Attu fell to the U.S. Army before the necessary preparations for a counterattack had been finished.

On 17 October 1943, Kongō again left Truk as part of a larger task force consisting of five battleships, three fleet carriers, eight heavy cruisers, three light cruisers, and numerous destroyers. These sortied in response to U.S. Navy air raids on Wake Island. No contact between the two forces was made, and the Japanese task force returned to Truk on 26 October 1943. She soon left Truk for home waters, and on 16 December 1943, Kongō arrived at Sasebo for refits and training in the Inland Sea.

=== 1944: Combat and loss ===
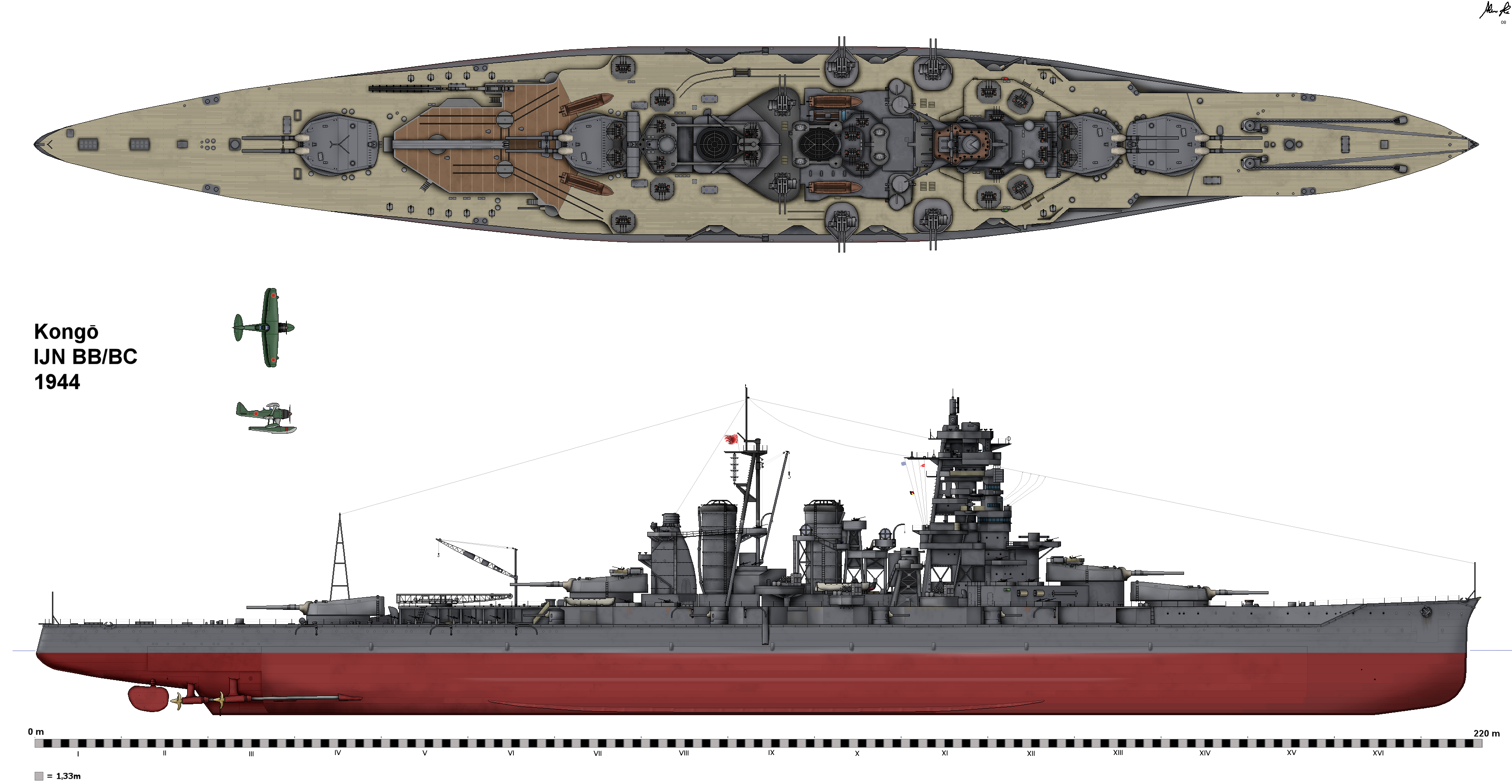
Kongō in her 1944 configuration

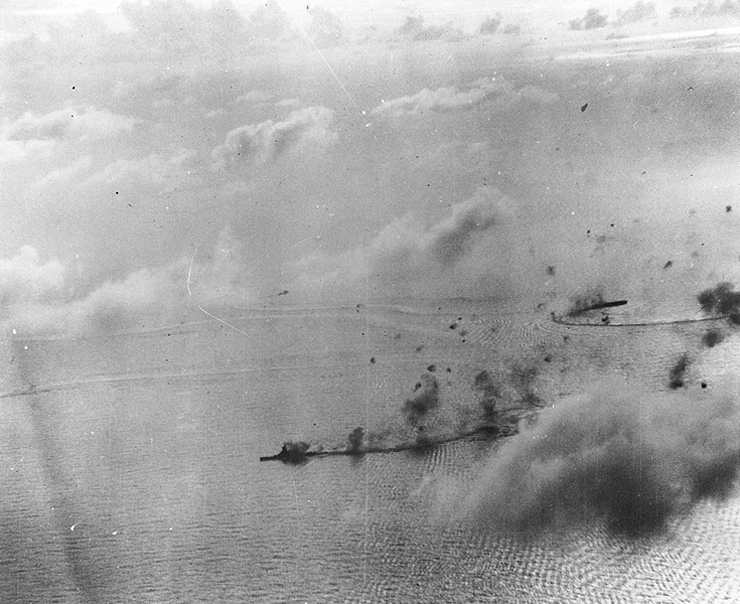
Kongō under attack during the Battle of the Philippine Sea, 20 June 1944

In January 1944, Kongō was dry docked for a reconfiguration of her antiaircraft suite. Four 6-inch guns and a pair of twin 25 mm mounts were removed and replaced with six twin 5-inch guns and four triple 25 mm mounts. The Third Battleship Division departed from Kure on 8 March 1944. Arriving at Lingga on 14 March 1944, the division remained for training until 11 May 1944. On 11 May 1944, Kongō and Admiral Ozawa's Mobile Fleet departed from Lingga bound for Tawitawi, where they were joined by Vice Admiral Takeo Kurita's Force C. On 13 June, Ozawa's Mobile Fleet departed from Tawitawi bound for the Mariana Islands. During the Battle of the Philippine Sea, Kongō escorted Japanese fast carriers and remained undamaged in counterattacks from US carrier aircraft on 20 June. When she returned to Japan, 13 triple and 40 single 25-mm mounts were added to her antiaircraft armament, for a total of over 100 mounts. In August, two more 6-inch guns were removed and another 18 single mounts were installed.

=== Battle of Leyte Gulf ===
On 22 October 1944, Kongō departed from Lingga in preparation for Operation Sho-1, Japan's counterattack during the Battle of Leyte Gulf, the largest naval engagement in history, as part of Admiral Kurita's center force intent on destroying Allied troop convoys destined for the Philippines. The next day, though, the force was located by U.S. submarines USS Darter and USS Dace, which sank the heavy cruisers Atago and Maya, respectively, before Darter crippled the heavy cruiser Takao, forcing her out of the battle with the destroyers Naganami and Asashimo to escort her. The next day, a massive air wave from American aircraft attacked, and Kongō took light damage from bomb near misses, but nothing that could have handicapped her combat ability. This was due to the vast majority of the air attacks being focused on Musashi, which sank after nine hours to at least 17 bombs and 19 torpedo hits. Admiral Kurita ordered a false retreat – successfully fooling the Americans – then two hours later raced his ships back in the direction of the Leyte Gulf landings.

==== Battle off Samar ====
The next day, Kongō was continuing on her way when Kurita noticed enemy ships in the distance. This was Taffy 3, a group of six US escort carriers, three destroyers, and four destroyer escorts supporting the Leyte landings, with Kurita mistaking them for full-sized fleet carriers. At 6:59, Kongō received permission to fire and unloaded several full broadsides from her main guns at 35,000 yards (32,000 m), thus starting the battle off Samar, but the extreme range meant that none hit. At 7:13, she took a bomb near miss to her stern, then five minutes later spotted the destroyer USS Johnston and fired three salvos. One of her 14-inch (356 mm) shells landed mere inches from Johnston, spraying red dye on the bridge, but this was followed at 7:22 by aircraft strafing, which disabled her main battery rangefinder.

At 7:25, Kongō entered a rain squall that completely blinded her guns, taking her out of the action. She then noticed a spread of five torpedoes a distance ahead of her, fired from the destroyer USS Hoel. She did not need to evade these torpedoes as is commonly stated in American narratives and simply watched them pass ahead. Only at 8:02 did Kongō leave the rain squall and prepare to fire her guns. At 8:23, at a distance of 26,300 yards (24,000 m), Kongō fired her first shots in over an hour, her target being the escort carrier USS Gambier Bay. A pair of battleship-caliber shell hits were scored, inflicting heavy damage, but these hits were also claimed by Yamato, which scored the matching firing angle, bearing, and range. At 8:50, Kongō fired on the destroyer USS Heermann at 28,000 yards (26,000 m) and finally successfully damaged an enemy vessel, as a pair of under-the-keel explosions completely flooded Heermann's bow, helping to cripple her alongside gunfire from the heavy cruisers Tone and Chikuma.

Finally, at 9:20, Kongō located the destroyer escort USS Samuel B. Roberts, which was out of torpedoes and almost entirely out of ammunition after heavy fighting and was an easy target for the Japanese battleship. Mistaking her for a destroyer, she switched to high-explosive rounds and fired off several salvos from her secondary battery and scored a pair of 6-inch (152 mm) shell hits, one hitting below the waterline and destroying Samuel B Roberts's forward fire room, cutting her speed to 17 knots, and the other exploding in her aft superstructure. Permission to fire the main guns was given, and a single broadside scored three or four 14-inch (356 mm) shell hits, which destroyed the rest of her engines and all power. The abandon-ship order was issued shortly afterwards, and Samuel B Roberts sank by the stern just after 10:00.

==== Miscredited hits ====
Many Western narratives on the battle off Samar have unfortunately vastly overexaggerated Kongō's battle performance during the engagement, with some crediting her with either sinking or helping to sink every ship Taffy 3 lost. During the 7:30 timeframe, Kongō has been credited with three 14-inch (356 mm) shell hits to the destroyer Johnston at 13,300 yards (12,200 m), cutting her speed to 17 knots and destroying three of her five 5-inch (127 mm) guns, enabling the crippled destroyer to be finished off by the light cruiser Yahagi leading the destroyers Yukikaze, Isokaze, Urakaze, and Nowaki. However, Kongō was blinded by rain squalls, had her main battery rangefinder disabled by aircraft, and was much farther than American reports. Evidence points to the battleship Yamato crippling and helping to sink Johnston. Similarly, Kongō has been identified with badly damaging the destroyer Hoel early into the battle, enabling her to be further crippled then finished off by other vessels. For the same reasons for why she could not help to sink Johnston, Kongō was also not in a position to help to sink Hoel, given she could not even see the destroyer at 9,000 yards (8,200 m). All evidence points towards the heavy cruiser Haguro having scored the initial devastating damage that wounded Hoel for the rest of her time afloat.

Later in the battle, Kongō has been given credit for helping to sink the escort carrier Gambier Bay, but she was at a distance far too great to realistically hit an enemy ship, and all battleship-caliber hits on the jeep carrier match with Yamato. Neither did Kongō assist in finishing off the crippled Hoel; the battleships Yamato and Nagato actually sank the destroyer.

However, mixed air and surface attacks sank three Japanese heavy cruisers, which added to the losses of previous battles, the increasing intensity of the air attacks, and Kurita discovering the true identity of his enemy via a radio message at the end of the battle, a retreat was ordered. During the action, Kongō dumped 211 14-inch (356 mm) shells and 272 6-inch (152 mm) shells. The next day, air attacks pestered the Japanese ships, and Kongō took a pair of bomb hits to the starboard side of her bow and five near misses, inflicting minor damage. After multiple days of fighting, Kongō and the rest of Kurita's center force finally returned to Brunei on the 28th.

=== Sinking ===
On 16 November, following a US air raid on Brunei, Kongō, along with Yamato, Nagato, and the rest of the First Fleet, departed from Brunei bound for Kure in preparation for a major reorganization of the fleet and battle repairs. On 20 November, they entered the Formosa Strait. Shortly after midnight on 21 November, the submarine USS Sealion made radar contact with the fleet at 44,000 yards (40,000 m). Maneuvering into position at 02:45, Sealion fired six bow torpedoes at Kongō, followed by three stern torpedoes at Nagato 15 minutes later. One minute after the first salvo was launched, two of the torpedoes were seen to hit Kongō on the port side, while a third sank the destroyer Urakaze with all hands. The torpedoes flooded two of Kongō's boiler rooms, but she was still able to make 16 kn (30 km/h; 18 mph). By 05:00, she had slowed to 11 kn (20 km/h; 13 mph) and was given permission to break off from the fleet and head to the port of Keelung in Formosa along with the destroyers Hamakaze and Isokaze as escort. Within 15 minutes of detaching from the main force, Kongō was listing 45° and flooding uncontrollably. At 5:18, she lost all power and the order was given to abandon ship. At 5:24, while the evacuation was under way, the forward 14-inch magazine exploded, and the broken ship sank quickly, with the loss of over 1,200 of her crew, including the commander of the Third Battleship Division and her captain.

Kongō is believed to have sunk in 350 feet (110 m) of water about 55 nautical miles (102 km; 63 mi) northwest of Keelung. She was one of only three British-built battleships sunk by submarine attack during World War II. The other two were the British Revenge-class battleship HMS Royal Oak and the Queen Elizabeth-class battleship HMS Barham. Kongō is the only Japanese battleship from World War II whose wreck has not been located or surveyed.

== See also ==
- List by death toll of ships sunk by submarines
