= Japanese destroyer Arare =

Two ships of the Japanese Navy have been named Arare:

- Japanese destroyer Arare (1905), a Harusame-class destroyer launched in 1905 and broken up in 1924.
- Japanese destroyer Arare (1937), an Asashio-class destroyer launched in 1937 and sunk in 1942.
