= USS Growler (SS-215) =

Submarine of the United States

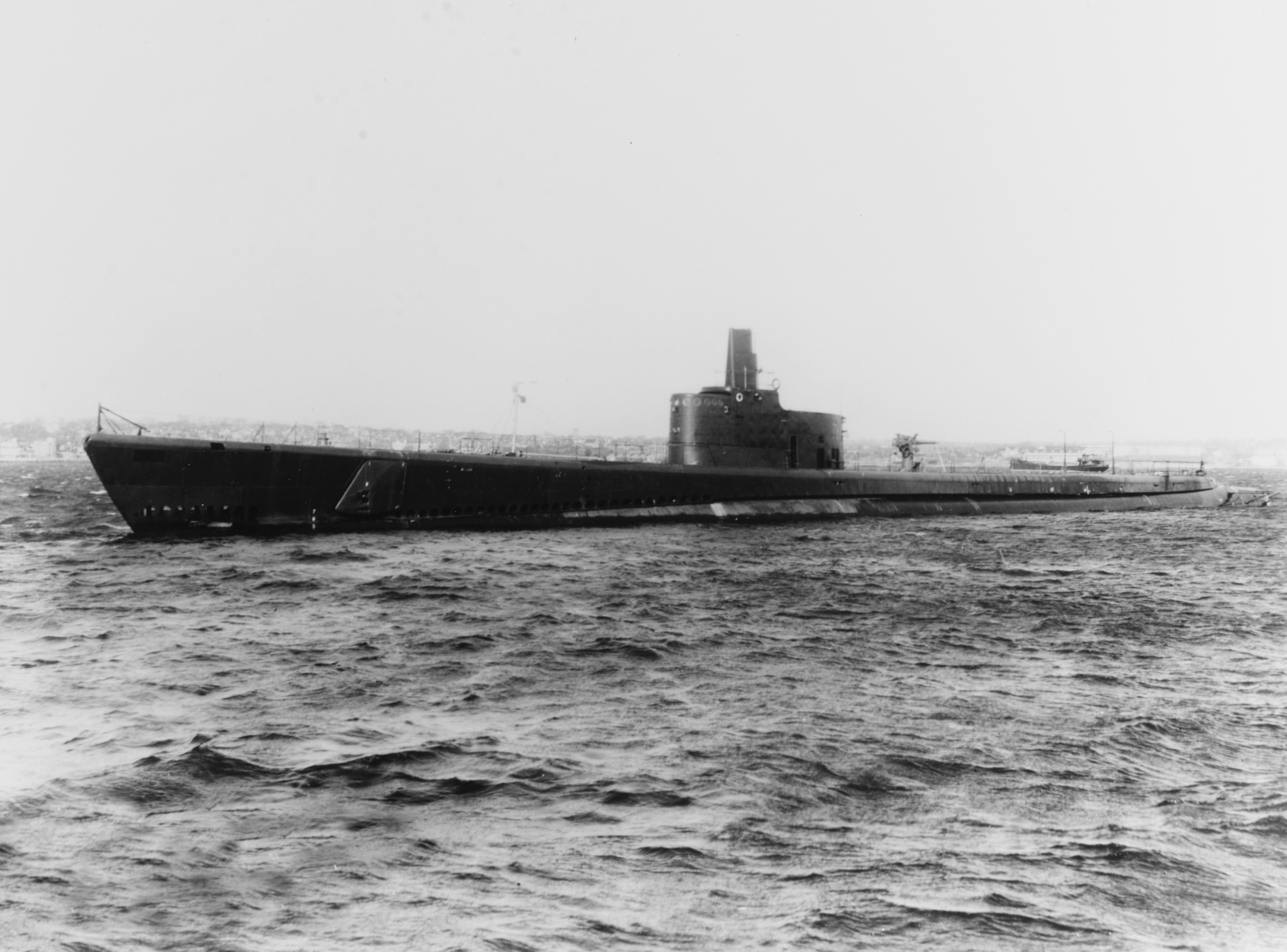
- USS Growler (SS-215) off the Electric Boat Company, Groton, Connecticut, on 21 February 1942.

History

United States
- Name: Growler
- Namesake: Growler fish
- Builder: Electric Boat Company, Groton, Connecticut
- Laid down: 10 February 1941
- Launched: 22 November 1941
- Sponsored by: Mrs. Robert L. Ghormley
- Commissioned: 20 March 1942
- Nickname(s): Kangaroo Express, following repairs in 1943
- Fate: Sunk by Japanese vessels west of the Philippines, 8 November 1944

General characteristics
- Class & type: Gato-class diesel-electric submarine
- Displacement: 1,525 long tons (1,549 t) surfaced; 2,424 long tons (2,463 t) submerged
- Length: 311 ft 9 in (95.02 m)
- Beam: 27 ft 3 in (8.31 m)
- Draft: 17 ft (5.2 m) maximum
- Propulsion: 4 × General Motors Model 16-248 V16 Diesel engines driving electric generators; 2 × 126-cell Sargo batteries; 4 × high-speed General Electric electric motors with reduction gears; two propellers; 5,400 shp (4.0 MW) surfaced; 2,740 shp (2.0 MW) submerged
- Speed: 21 knots (39 km/h) surfaced; 9 kn (17 km/h) submerged
- Range: 11,000 nautical miles (20,000 km) surfaced at 10 kn (19 km/h)
- Endurance: 48 hours at 2 kn (3.7 km/h) submerged; 75 days on patrol
- Test depth: 300 ft (91 m)
- Complement: 6 officers, 54 enlisted
- Armament: 10 × 21-inch (533 mm) torpedo tubes; 6 forward, 4 aft; 24 torpedoes; 1 × 3-inch (76 mm) / 50 caliber deck gun; Bofors 40 mm and Oerlikon 20 mm cannon

USS Growler (hull number SS-215), a Gato-class submarine, was the third ship of the United States Navy named for the growler.

Commissioned in March 1942, Growler carried out ten successful war patrols in the Pacific theater, earning eight battle stars in the process. During her eleventh patrol, Growler attacked a Japanese ship convoy alongside USS Hake and USS Hardhead, and during the attack an underwater explosion was heard; neither Growler nor anyone aboard her were ever seen or heard from again.

USS Growler is listed as lost with all hands on 8 November 1944, presumably due to a Japanese depth charge.

== Construction and commissioning ==
Growler′s keel was laid down by the Electric Boat Company of Groton, Connecticut. She was launched on 2 November 1941, sponsored by Mrs. Lucile E. Ghormley, wife of Vice Admiral Robert L. Ghormley, Special Naval Observer to the United Kingdom. Growler was commissioned on 20 March 1942 with Lieutenant Commander Howard W. Gilmore in command.

== First patrol (June – July 1942) ==
Growler’s first war patrol began 29 June 1942 as she cleared Pearl Harbor for her assigned patrol area around Dutch Harbor, Alaska; stopping off at Midway Island on 24 June she entered her area on 30 June. Five days later she saw her first action; sighting three destroyers, Growler closed them submerged, launched her torpedoes and then surfaced. Her torpedoes struck the first two targets amidships putting them out of action, and hit the third in the bow but not before that target had launched two torpedoes at Growler. As the Japanese torpedoes "swished down each side", Growler dived deep, but no depth charges followed. The Japanese destroyer Arare was sunk, and the other two, Kasumi and Shiranui, were severely damaged. Growler completed her patrol without finding any more targets, and on 17 July berthed at Pearl Harbor.

== Second patrol (August – September 1942) ==
On 5 August 1942 Growler began her second and most successful war patrol, entering her area near Taiwan on 21 August. Two days later she conducted a submerged night attack on a freighter, surfacing to give chase when both torpedoes ran under the target and failed to explode; the freighter's quick exit into shallow waters prevented Growler's gun attack. Patrolling amidst a large fishing fleet on 25 August, Growler sighted and fired at a large passenger freighter but all three torpedoes missed; after a three-hour depth charge attack, in which some 53 "ash cans" were dropped, Growler surfaced and almost immediately spotted a convoy. After two hours of maneuvering, she failed to catch up with the main body of the convoy but did fire at and sink an ex-gunboat, Senyo Maru. No more ships appeared in this immediate area for three days, so Growler shifted to the east side of the island. First to fall victim was Eifuku Maru, a 5,866 ton cargo ship, which Growler sank within 40 minutes of first sighting her 31 August. On 4 September Growler sank Kashino, a 10,360 ton supply ship; three days later she sent two torpedoes into the 2,204 ton cargo ship Taika Maru, which broke in half and sank in two minutes. On 15 September Growler cleared her patrol area, and arrived back at Pearl 30 September.

== Third patrol (October – December 1942) ==
During refitting, new surface radar was installed, as well as a new 20 mm gun; thus equipped, Growler sailed from Hawaii for her new patrol area in the Solomon Islands across the key Truk-Rabaul shipping lanes. Her patrol area in these days of bitter fighting over Guadalcanal was almost continually covered by enemy planes and only eight enemy ships were sighted with no chance for attack. Growler cleared the area 3 December and arrived in Brisbane, Australia, on 10 December.

== Fourth patrol (January – February 1943) ==
1 January 1943 saw Growler sail from Brisbane. Entering her patrol area, again athwart the Truk-Rabaul shipping lanes, on 11 January, she waited only five days before sighting an enemy convoy. Maneuvering inside the escorts, Growler launched two torpedoes and saw them hit; then, as her war diary reports, she was in the unfortunate predicament of being about 400 yards (370 m) from the destroyer and had to dive without being able to continue the attack. She was credited with sinking Chifuku Maru, a 5,857 ton passenger/cargo ship.

The patrol continued as normal with two further attacks, but no sinkings until shortly after 01:00 7 February when Growler stealthily approached the armed food supply vessel Hayasaki for a night surface attack. The small fast ship suddenly turned to ram. Unable to avoid the collision, Gilmore ordered left full rudder and all ahead flank, and rammed the enemy amidships at 17 knots (31 km/h), bending Growler's bow 18 feet to the port side. As machine gun fire raked them at point-blank range, Commander Gilmore ordered the bridge cleared. As the commanding officer, Gilmore was the last to leave the bridge, but was grievously wounded before he could get below. Realizing that he was jeopardizing his boat's escape, he ordered "Take her down!". The executive officer, Lieutenant Commander Arnold F. Schade, shut the hatch and dived the boat. By saving his command at the cost of his own life, Gilmore became the first of seven World War II submariners to earn the Medal of Honor. Ensign William Wadsworth Williams and Fireman Third Class Wilbert Fletcher Kelley also lost their lives in this incident.

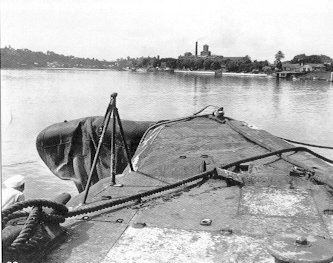
Growler′s bent bow.

Hayasaki was damaged but not sunk.

Severely damaged but still under control, Growler returned to Brisbane under command of Schade; she docked 17 February for extensive repairs. Following the refit, the submarine was nicknamed the Kangaroo Express, as the refabricated bow had two nickel kangaroos as decorations.

== Fifth, sixth, and seventh patrols ==
Growler’s fifth, sixth, and seventh patrols, out of Brisbane to the Bismarck-Solomons area, were relatively uneventful; heavy enemy air cover and a lack of targets resulted in her coming home empty-handed from all but the fifth, on which she sank the passenger/cargo ship Miyadono Maru. During that patrol, an Allied aircraft she identified as a United States Army Air Forces B-26 Marauder bomber attacked her on 27 June 1943, reporting her as a Japanese submarine. The plane's bombs landed several miles from Growler, and she submerged.

Growler's seventh patrol was marred by trouble with the storage battery and generators, and on 27 October 1943, only 11 days out of Brisbane, she was ordered to Pearl Harbor (arriving 7 November) and from there to the Navy Yard at Hunter's Point, California, for an extensive overhaul and refitting.

== Eighth patrol (February – April 1944) ==
Returning to the Pacific, on 21 February 1944, Growler departed Pearl Harbor, and after refueling at Midway Island, headed for her patrol area. However, a week out of Midway Island a typhoon's high seas and wind delayed her arrival to the patrol area. Once on station, Growler was again plagued by violent weather which made even periscope observation almost impossible. Growler returned to Majuro on 16 April.

== Ninth patrol (May – July 1944) ==
The submarine departed Majuro 14 May to take up patrol in the Mariana Islands-Eastern Philippine Islands-Luzon area, where the first stages of the attack on the Mariana Islands and the Battle of the Philippine Sea were getting underway. Rendezvousing with Bang (SS-385) and Seahorse (SS-304) to form a wolfpack, she continued the patrol closing several targets but achieving firing position only once, when she sank the cargo vessel Katori Maru.

== Tenth patrol (August – September 1944) ==
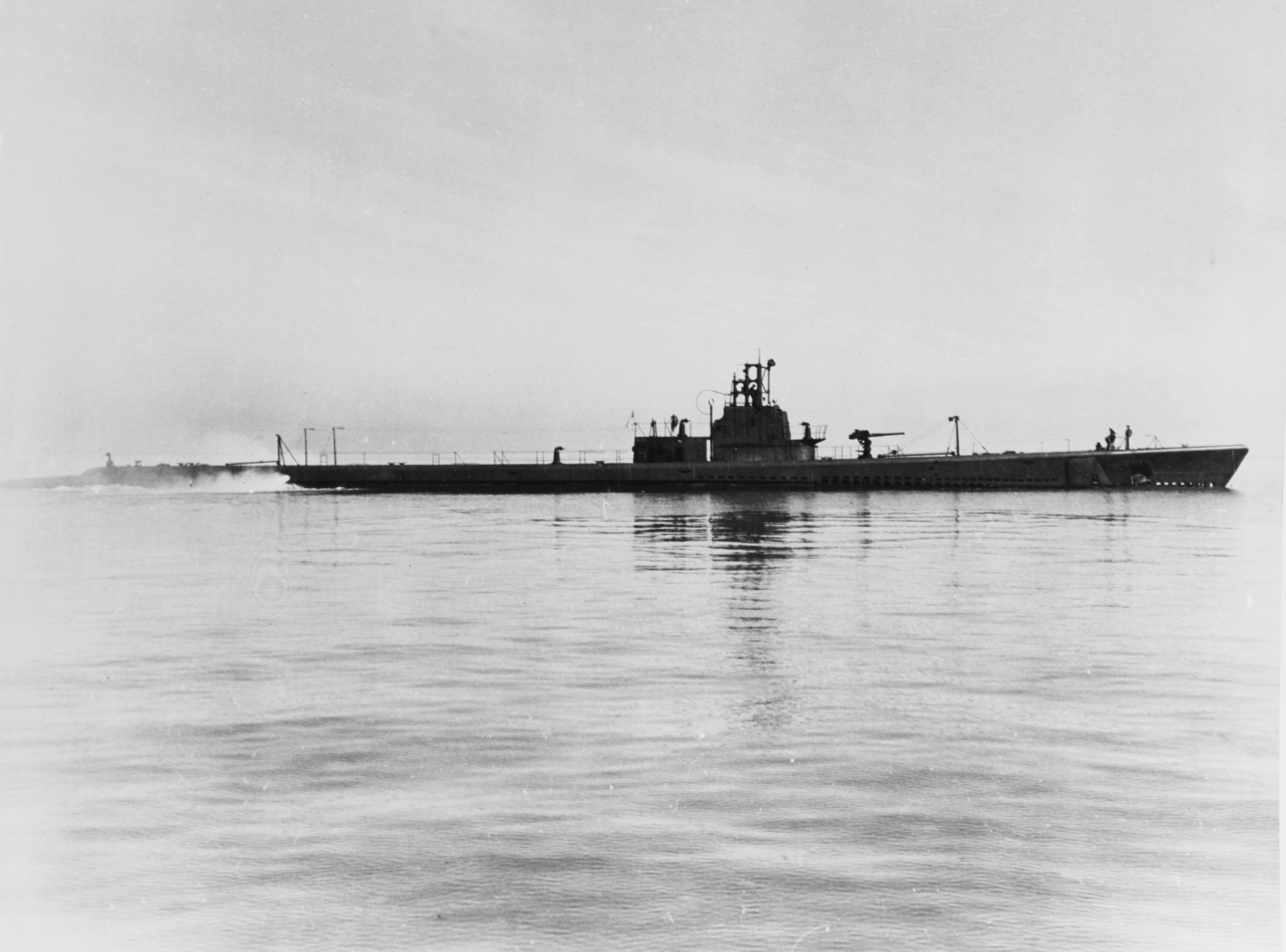
Growler in May 1943.

Her tenth patrol, out of Pearl Harbor on 11 August, found her in a new wolf pack, nicknamed "Ben's Busters" after Growler’s skipper, Commander T.B. ("Ben") Oakley; in company with Sealion (SS-315) and Pampanito (SS-383), she headed for the Formosa Straits area. Aided greatly by reconnaissance and guidance from friendly aircraft, the wolf pack closed a convoy for night surface action 31 August; their torpedoes plunged the Japanese into chaos, with their own ships shooting at each other in the dark, but no sinkings were reported. Two weeks later, 12 September, the wolf pack sighted a second convoy and closed for torpedo action. A destroyer spotted Growler and attacked her, but the sub calmly fired a spread of torpedoes at the oncoming destroyer. Heavily damaged by the torpedoes, the flaming destroyer bore down on Growler and only adroit maneuvering took the submarine out of the enemy's way; paint on the bridge was seared by the heat of the passing destroyer. Meantime Growler’s other torpedoes and those of Sealion and Pampanito were hitting the convoy, and when Ben's Busters returned to Fremantle submarine base, Western Australia on 26 September, they were credited with a total of six enemy ships. Growler had sunk the destroyer Shikinami and the frigate Hirado; her companions also racked up two kills each. Two of the sunken vessels, Rakuyo Maru and Kachidoki Maru, were transporting Allied prisoners of the Japanese; the three submarines rescued over 150 Allied prisoners. This difficult operation had been carried out despite rough seas caused by an approaching typhoon.

== Eleventh patrol (October – November 1944) ==
Growler’s 11th and final war patrol began from Fremantle on 20 October 1944 in a wolf pack with Hake (SS-256) and Hardhead (SS-365). On 8 November the wolf pack, again headed by Growler, closed a convoy for attack, with Growler on the opposite side of the enemy from Hake and Hardhead. The order to commence attacking was the last communication ever received from Growler. After the attack was underway, Hake and Hardhead heard what sounded like a torpedo explosion and then a series of depth charges on Growler’s side of the convoy, and then nothing. All efforts to contact Growler for the next three days proved futile. The submarine, veteran of seven successful war patrols, was listed as lost in action against the enemy, cause unknown. Possibly she was sunk by one of her own torpedoes, but it is probable that she was sunk by the convoy's escorts, destroyer Shigure and coastal defense ships Chiburi and CD-19.

== Honors and awards ==
- Asiatic-Pacific Campaign Medal with eight battle stars for World War II service

== In popular culture ==
Growler is one of several submarines (along with the era's USS Tang, Bowfin, Seawolf, and Spadefish) whose war patrols can be re-enacted in the 1985 MicroProse computer game Silent Service and the game's various ports, including Konami's 1989 release for the Nintendo Entertainment System.

A fictionalized and resequenced version of the ramming attack by Growler on her fourth patrol features prominently in the John Wayne movie Operation Pacific.
