= Japanese destroyer Shiranui (1938) =

Kagerō-class destroyer

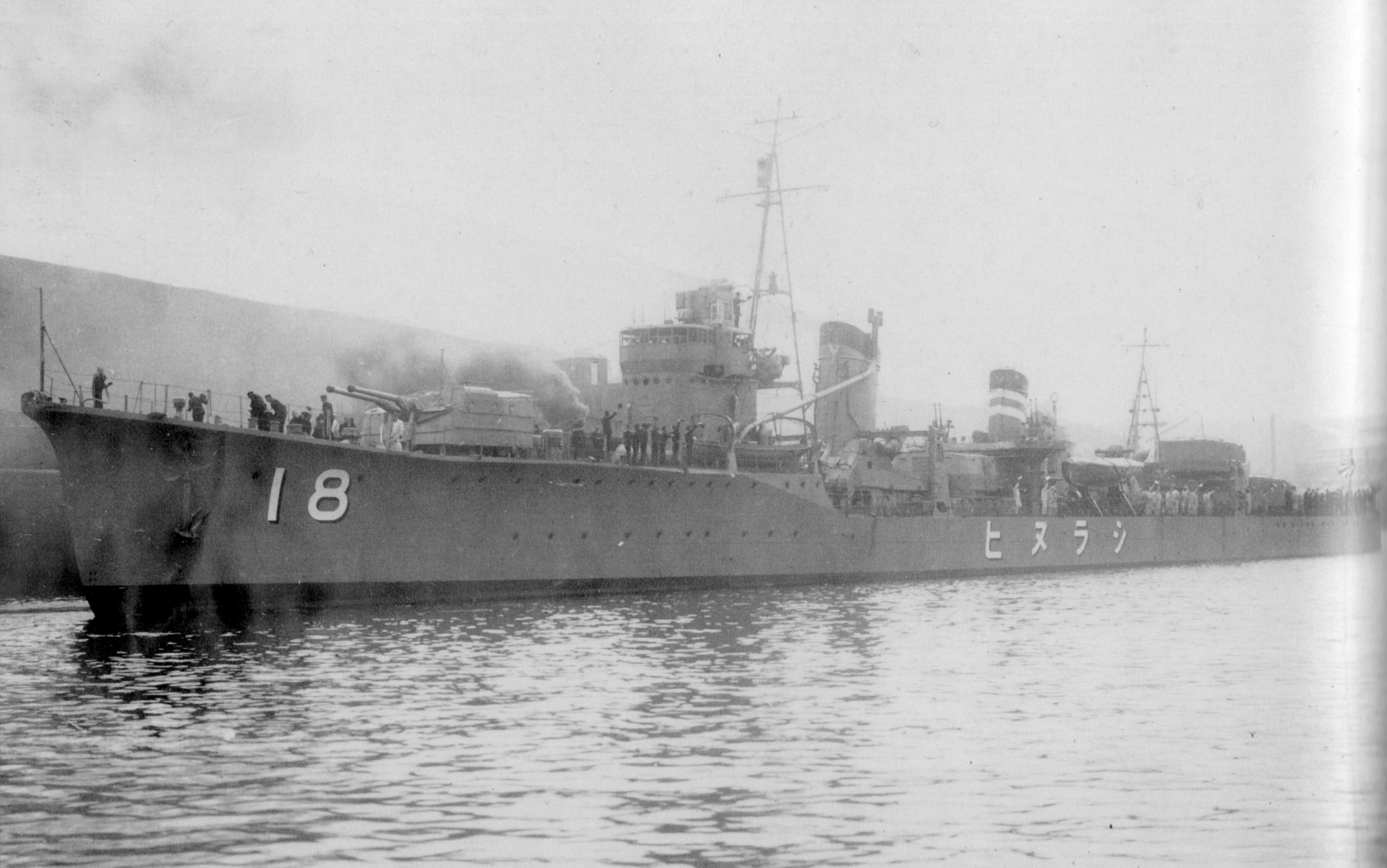
- Shiranui on 20 December 1939

History

Empire of Japan
- Name: Shiranui
- Builder: Uraga Dock Company
- Laid down: 30 August 1937
- Launched: 28 June 1938
- Completed: 20 December 1939
- Stricken: 10 December 1944
- Fate: Sunk in action, 27 October 1944

General characteristics
- Class & type: Kagerō-class destroyer
- Displacement: 2,033 long tons (2,066 t) standard
- Length: 118.5 m (388 ft 9 in)
- Beam: 10.8 m (35 ft 5 in)
- Draft: 3.8 m (12 ft 6 in)
- Propulsion: 3 × Kampon water tube boilers; 2 × Kanpon impulse turbines; 2 × shafts, 52,000 shp (39 MW)
- Speed: 35.5 knots (40.9 mph; 65.7 km/h)
- Range: 6,053 NM at 18 knots (21 mph; 33 km/h)
- Complement: 239
- Armament: (1939); 6 × 12.7 cm/50 Type 3 DP guns; 2 × Type 96 25 mm AA guns; 8 × 610 mm (24 in) torpedo tubes; 18 depth charges; 2 × paravanes; (1944); 4 × 12.7 cm/50 Type 3 DP guns; 28 × Type 96 25 mm AA guns; 8 × 610 mm (24 in) torpedo tubes; 36 depth charges

Shiranui (不知火, Phosphorescent Light; Shiranuhi in the historical kana orthography) was the second vessel to be commissioned in the 19-vessel Kagerō-class destroyers built for the Imperial Japanese Navy in the late 1930s under the Circle Three Supplementary Naval Expansion Program (Maru San Keikaku).

Shiranui operated with the Kido Butai aircraft carrier force for the first few months of WW2, including taking part in the Pearl Harbor strike force. The only break from this came at the beginning of March, where Shiranui involved herself in a small surface action when she helped to sink the Dutch freighter Modjokerto. Shortly after escorting troop convoys during the battle of Midway, Shiranui's entire forward 3rd was blown off by a torpedo from the submarine USS Growler. Repairs lasted until the end of 1943, with the damaging being extensively photographed. After a series of patrol duties, she took part in the battle of Leyte Gulf, nearly surviving the battle, but being sunk with all hands by dive bombers from USS Enterprise during its final stages.

== Background ==
The Kagerō class was an enlarged and improved version of the preceding Asashio class of destroyers. Their crew numbered 240 officers and enlisted men. The ships measured 118.5 meters (388 ft 9 in) overall, with a beam of 10.8 meters (35 ft 5 in) and a draft of 3.76 meters (12 ft 4 in). They displaced 2,065 metric tons (2,032 long tons) at standard load and 2,529 metric tons (2,489 long tons) at deep load. The ships had two Kampon geared steam turbines, each driving one propeller shaft, using steam provided by three Kampon water-tube boilers. The turbines were rated at a total of 52,000 shaft horsepower (39,000 kW) for a designed speed of 35 knots (65 km/h; 40 mph). However, the class proved capable of exceeding 35.5 knots on sea trials. The ships were designed with a range of 5,000 nautical miles (9,300 km; 5,800 mi) at a speed of 18 knots (33 km/h; 21 mph). However, the class more accurately proved to have a range of 6,053 nautical miles (11,210 km; 6,966 mi) on trials.

The main armament of the Kagerō class consisted of six Type 3 127-millimeter (5.0 in) guns in three twin-gun turrets, one superfiring pair aft and one turret forward of the superstructure. They were built with four Type 96 25-millimeter (1.0 in) anti-aircraft guns in two twin-gun mounts, but more of these guns were added over the course of the war. The ships were also armed with eight 610-millimeter (24.0 in) torpedo tubes for the oxygen-fueled Type 93 "Long Lance" torpedo in two quadruple traversing mounts; one reload was carried for each tube. Their anti-submarine weapons consisted of between 18 and 36 depth charges.

== Operational history ==
=== Early Months of WW2 ===
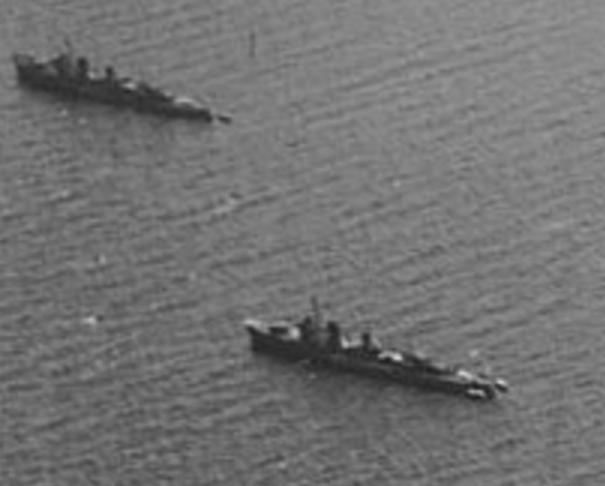
Shiranui (bottom) and Kuroshio (top) anchored during an Imperial Navy fleet review, 11 October 1940

At the time of the attack on Pearl Harbor, Shiranui was assigned as Captain Miyasaka Yoshito's flagship of destroyer division 18 (Shiranui, Kagerō, Kasumi, Arare) and a member of destroyer squadron 2 of the IJN 2nd Fleet, and had deployed from Etorofu in the Kurile Islands, as part of the escort for Admiral Nagumo's Carrier Strike Force which was responsible for the Pearl Harbor attack. The planes sank or damaged 20 ships, including several battleships, but it was carried out solely by air attacks, with Shiranui seeing no direct role. She returned to Kure on 24 December.

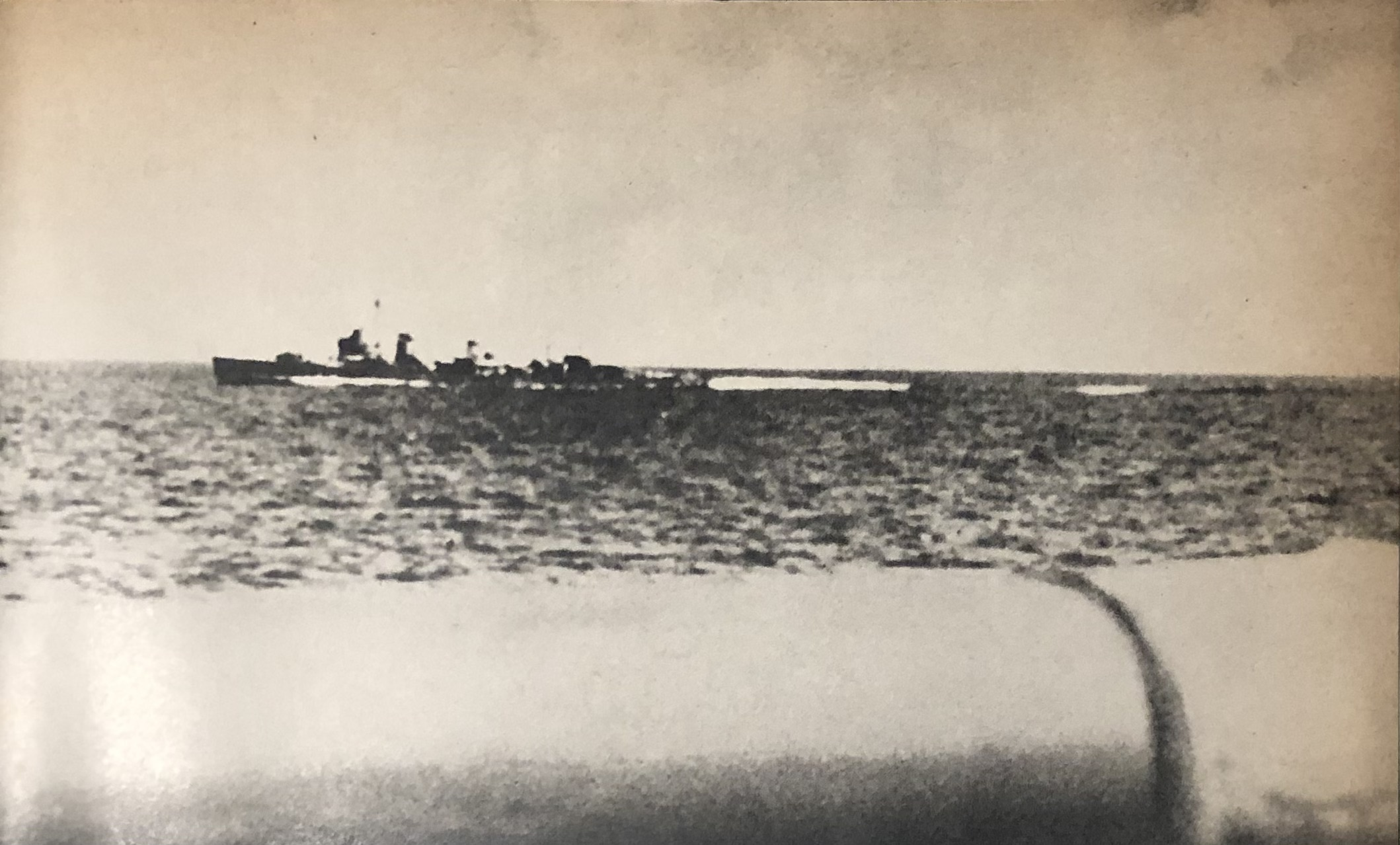
Shiranui underway to Sakei Bay at 30 knots, late 1941

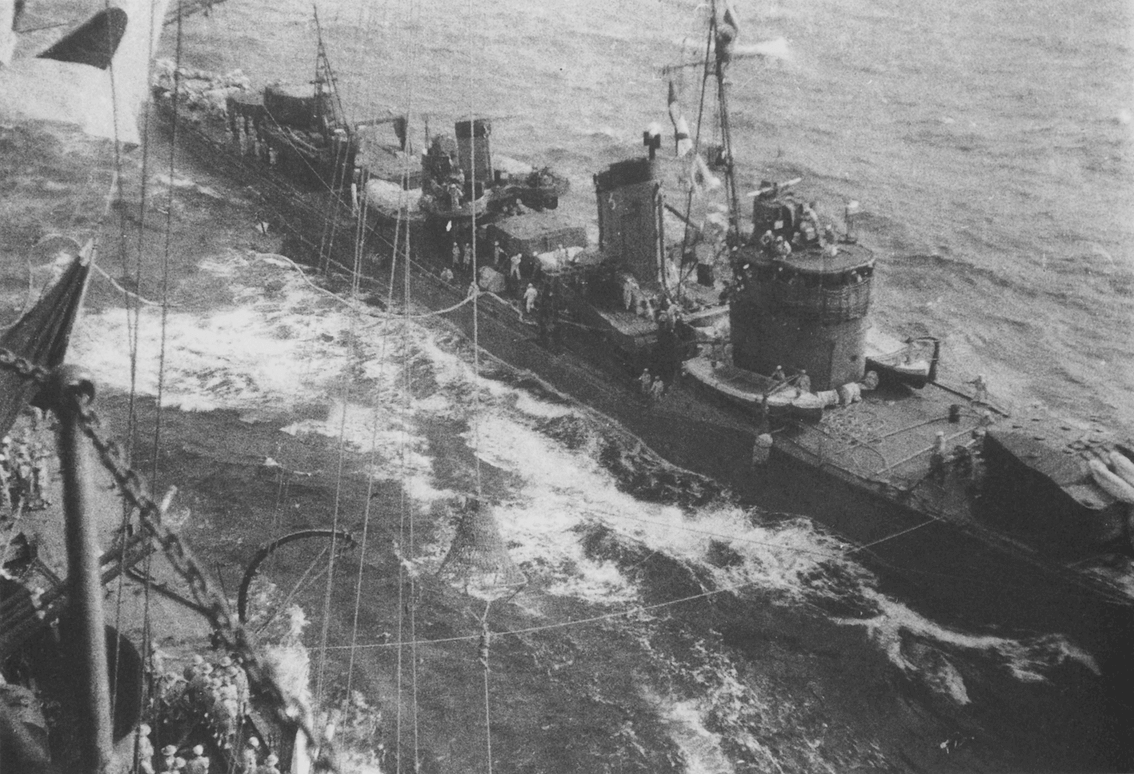
Shiranui refueling from the battleship Kongō during the Indian Ocean Raid, 7 April 1942

In January 1942, Shiranui escorted aircraft carriers Shōkaku and Zuikaku to Truk, and onwards to Rabaul to cover landings of Japanese forces at Rabaul, Kavieng and Salamaua. In February, she escorted the Japanese carriers in the Bombing of Darwin, and was then based at Staring-baai in Sulawesi, Netherlands East Indies for patrols south of Java. On 1 March, Shiranui was patrolling alongside the rest of destroyer division 18, when a Japanese floatplane located the 8,806-ton Dutch freighter Modjokerto, prompting destroyer squadron 2 to steam in hopes of engaging the Dutch ship. Eventually, they tracked down Modjokerto, and in a one sided massacre that lasted just 3 minutes, gunfire from Shiranui, Kagerō, Kasumi Isokaze, Ariake, and Yūgure blasted Modjokerto and sank her in just three minutes.

Shiranui departed Staring-bay on 27 March to escort the carrier force in the Indian Ocean raid throughout the early days of April. After the Japanese air strikes on Colombo and Trincomalee in Ceylon, which sank a light carrier, two heavy cruisers, two destroyers, a corvette, and three merchant ships, she was part of the force which attempted to track down the American aircraft carriers responsible for the Doolittle Raid, but was forced to retreat to the Kure Naval Arsenal for repairs on 23 April. She deployed from Saipan on 3 June as part of the escort for the troop convoy in the Battle of Midway, but turned away after the battle resulted in a devastating defeat which sank four Japanese aircraft carriers and a heavy cruiser. Afterwards, she escorted the cruisers Kumano and Suzuya from Truk back to Kure. On 28 June, she was assigned to escort the aircraft carrier Chiyoda to Kiska in the Aleutian Islands on a supply mission.

=== Damage from USS Growler ===
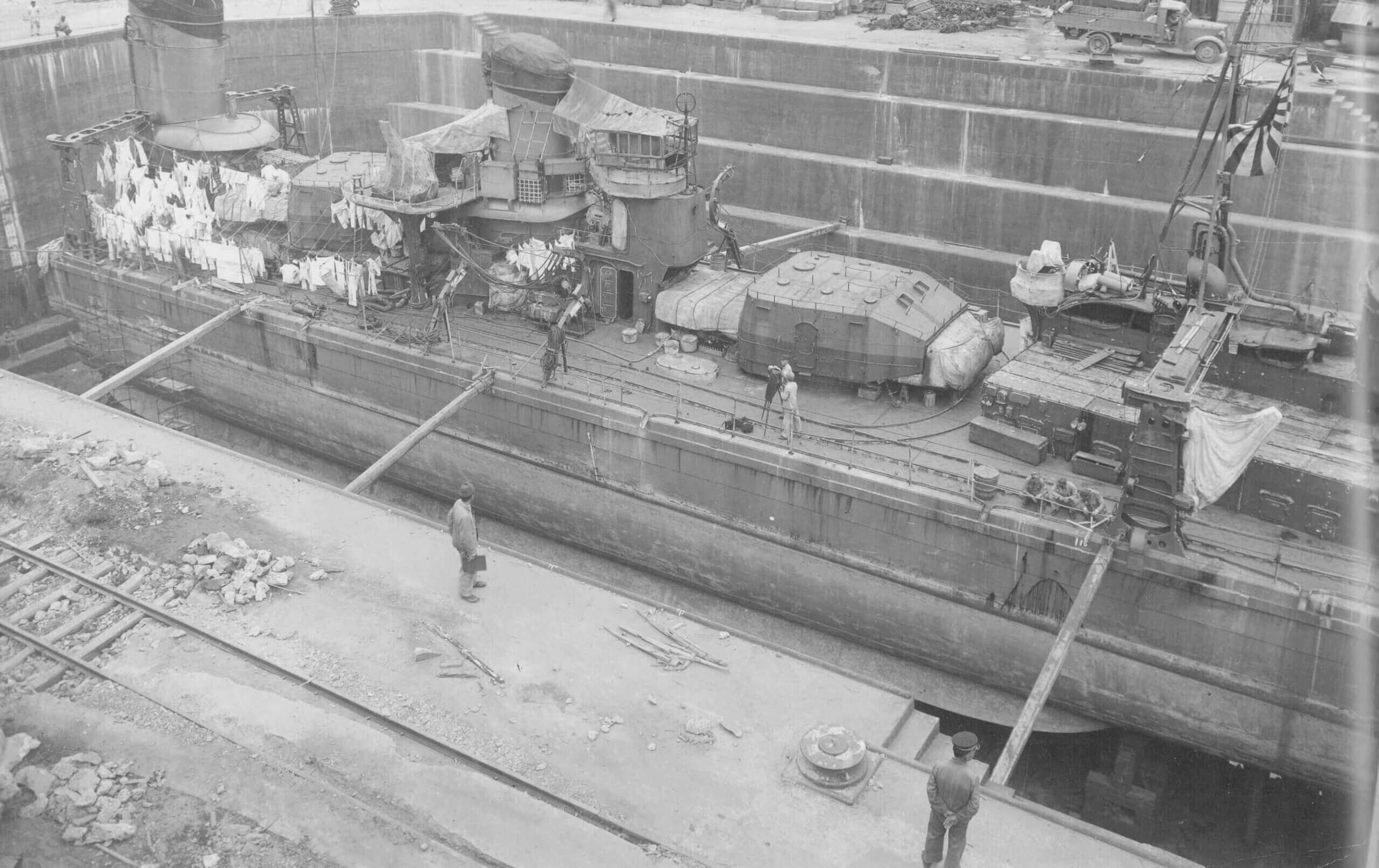
Shiranui under repairs in Maizuru after being torpedoed by USS Growler, 17 September 1942

On 5 July, Shiranui, Arare, and Kasumi were outside Kiska Harbor, when they were located by the submarine USS Growler, which submerged and quickly closed the range for an attack. Lashing out four torpedoes, Growler slowly surfaced to watch her targets, and to the crew's amazement one torpedo hit every ship. Shiranui watched as a Growler torpedo hit Arare, blasting her in half and sinking her with the loss of 104 lives. Another torpedo hit Kasumi's bow, igniting her turret 1 magazines and sheering her bow clean off. Finally, much to her crew's horror, a third torpedo ripped into Shiranui just ahead of her forward funnel. Instantly, three of her four engine rooms flooded, her keel broke, and eventually the ship's entire forward third, bridge, turret 1, bow and all broke off and sank. Surprisingly, only 3 men died. The fourth and final torpedo barely missed Shiranui, then almost hit Kasumi, before continuing on its way. Growler, concluding to have sunk two destroyers and crippled a third, retreated from the area to evade potential depth charges.

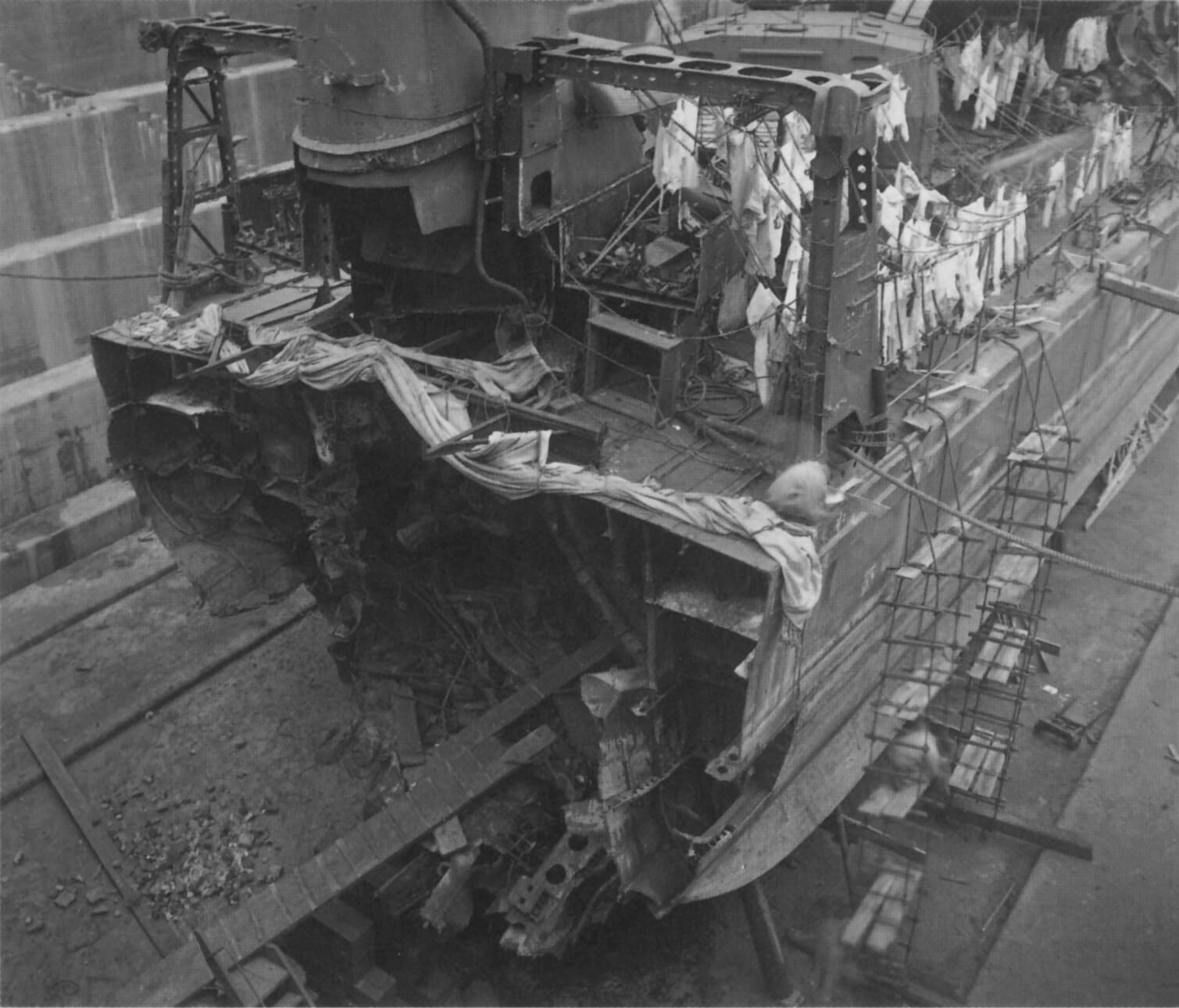
Another angle of the mauled Shiranui under repairs

The horrifically crippled, but still afloat Shiranui was left dead in the water unable to move without emergency repairs, but luckily, she was located by the destroyer Naganami, which towed her to Kiska Harbor, while the destroyer Ikazuchi did the same to Kasumi. Because of this, the 18th destroyer division was disbanded, and Kagerō was reassigned to the 15th destroyer division. After temporary repairs, Shiranui was further towed to the Maizuru naval arsenal, where she was immediately drydocked for some much needed repairs. On 17 September, the extreme damage was heavily photographed by Japanese navy officials. The damage was so extensive, that Shiranui remained under repairs until 15 November 1943, well over a year after she had been torpedoed. During these repairs, her "X"-turret was replaced by two additional triple Type 96 25mm AA guns.

=== Further actions ===
Shiranui was assigned to the IJN 9th Fleet, and escorted convoys to Palau, Wewak and Hollandia during January and February 1944. On 1 March, she was reassigned to the IJN 5th Fleet and was assigned to northern waters, making patrols from her base at Ominato Guard District in April, and returning with the cruisers Nachi and Ashigara to Kure at the start of August. During the Battle of Leyte Gulf on 24–25 October 1944, Shiranui was assigned to Vice Admiral Shōji Nishimura's diversionary force at the Battle of Surigao Strait, during which she fired torpedoes at the American fleet, but scored no hits, before assisting in chasing off PT boats with surface gunfire. After the battle, she departed Coron to search for the missing cruiser Kinu and destroyer Uranami, and took on survivors from the destroyer Hayashimo. On 27 October she was sunk with all hands by dive-bombers from the aircraft carrier USS Enterprise, 80 miles (130 km) north of Iloilo, Panay (12°0′N 122°30′E).

Shiranui was removed from the navy list on 10 December 1944.

== See also ==
- List of ships of the Imperial Japanese Navy

== Books ==
- Brown, David (1990). Warship Losses of World War Two. Naval Institute Press. ISBN 1-55750-914-X.
- D'Albas, Andrieu (1965). Death of a Navy: Japanese Naval Action in World War II. Devin-Adair Pub. ISBN 0-8159-5302-X.
- Evans, David (1979). Kaigun: Strategy, Tactics, and Technology in the Imperial Japanese Navy, 1887–1941. US Naval Institute Press. ISBN 0-87021-192-7.
- Roger Chesneau, ed. (1980). Conway's All the World's Fighting Ships 1922–1946. Grenwitch: Conway Maritime Press. ISBN 0-85177-146-7.
- Howarth, Stephen (1983). The Fighting Ships of the Rising Sun: The Drama of the Imperial Japanese Navy, 1895–1945. Atheneum. ISBN 0-689-11402-8.
- Jentsura, Hansgeorg (1976). Warships of the Imperial Japanese Navy, 1869–1945. US Naval Institute Press. ISBN 0-87021-893-X.
- Watts, A.J. (1966). Japanese warships of World War II. Ian Allan. ISBN 0711002150.
- Whitley, M. J. (1988). Destroyers of World War 2. Cassell Publishing. ISBN 1-85409-521-8.
