= George Thurston =

British naval architect

Sir Thomas George Owens Thurston, KBE (1869 – 22 January 1950) was a British naval architect in the early half of the 20th century.

== Life and career ==
Born Thomas George Owens in 1869, he trained in naval architecture in Liverpool and Newcastle upon Tyne and worked on mercantile shipbuilding. He later worked under Philip Watts at Elswick shipyard. He became the chief naval architect for Vickers Limited from around the turn of the 20th century up to the early 1920s. Later he became the firm's naval director. He contributed to the designs of the Imperial Japanese Navy battlecruiser Kongō and the dreadnought battleship Erin. During the First World War he was responsible for the large and diverse volume of construction in the Vickers yard.

He changed his name by deed poll in 1915 to Thomas George Owens Thurston prior to attaining his knighthood. Although he took Owens as his third Christian name, his descendants conjoined his original and new surnames to take the family name of Owens-Thurston.

In 1923, Thurston published a 15-page essay, "The Influence of the Washington Conference on Naval Design", in Brassey’s Naval & Shipping Annual, regarding the recent Washington Naval Conference and its associated Treaty:

This proposed cruiser, on a displacement within 10,000 tons, is capable of carrying eight 7 ½-in. or 8-in. guns twin mounted in barbettes on the centre line, 2 forward and 2 aft, and an auxiliary armament of 4-in. high angle guns suitably placed, and is capable of maintaining a speed of not less than 34 knots. The protection in every particular is equivalent to the protection of cruisers of this type built or building. As it is quite possible satisfactorily to embody all of these features in a design of such displacement, it appears to me that anything short of this should not be accepted by any first-class Power under present conditions.

In 1901, he married Ada King, who predeceased him in 1946. Together they had seven sons and one daughter, one of whom also predeceased him. Thurston died on 22 January 1950 at Torquay, aged 80.
