= Japanese destroyer Arare (1937) =

Asashio-class destroyer

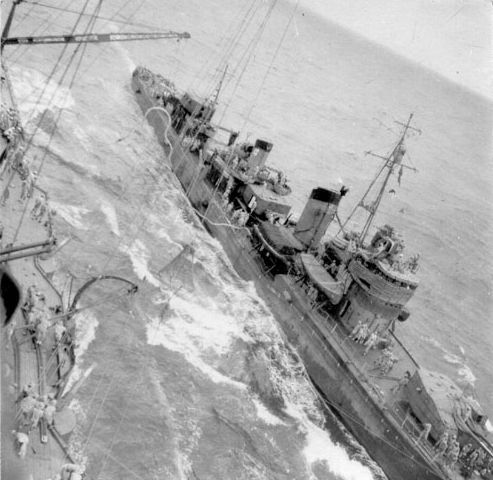
- Arare refueling from the Japanese battleship Kongō during the Indian Ocean raid, 7 April 1942

History

Empire of Japan
- Name: Arare
- Ordered: 1934 Maru-2 Program
- Builder: Maizuru Naval Arsenal
- Laid down: 5 March 1937
- Launched: 16 November 1937
- Commissioned: 15 April 1939
- Stricken: 31 July 1942
- Fate: Torpedoed and sunk, 5 July 1942

General characteristics
- Class & type: Asashio-class destroyer
- Displacement: 2,370 long tons (2,408 t)
- Length: 111 m (364 ft) pp; 115 m (377 ft 4 in)waterline; 118.3 m (388 ft 1 in) OA
- Beam: 10.3 m (33 ft 10 in)
- Draft: 3.7 m (12 ft 2 in)
- Propulsion: 2-shaft geared turbine, 3 boilers, 51,000 shp (38,031 kW)
- Speed: 34.85 knots (40.10 mph; 64.54 km/h)
- Range: 5,700 nmi (10,600 km) at 10 kn (19 km/h); 960 nmi (1,780 km) at 34 kn (63 km/h)
- Complement: 230
- Armament: 6 × 12.7 cm/50 Type 3 DP guns; up to 28 × Type 96 AA guns; up to 4 × Type 93 AA guns; 8 × 24 in (610 mm) torpedo tubes; 36 depth charges

Arare (霰; "Hailstone") was the tenth and last of the Asashio-class destroyers built for the Imperial Japanese Navy in the mid-1930s under the Circle Two Supplementary Naval Expansion Program (Maru Ni Keikaku).

== History ==
The Asashio-class destroyers were larger and more capable than the preceding Shiratsuyu class, as Japanese naval architects were no longer constrained by the provisions of the London Naval Treaty. These light cruiser-sized vessels were designed to take advantage of Japan’s lead in torpedo technology, and to accompany the Japanese main striking force and in both day and night attacks against the United States Navy as it advanced across the Pacific Ocean, according to Japanese naval strategic projections. Despite being one of the most powerful classes of destroyers in the world at the time of their completion, none survived the Pacific War.

Arare, built at the Maizuru Naval Arsenal, was laid down on 5 March 1937, launched on 16 November 1937 and commissioned on 15 April 1939. On completion, she was assigned to the IJN 2nd Fleet as part of Desdiv 18, Desron 2 under command of Commander Tomoe Ogata.

== Operational history ==
On 22 November, Arare departed from the Kurile Islands as an escort to Admiral Nagumo’s Carrier Strike Force, specifically guarding the fleet tankers accompanying the strike force. On 7 December, these aircraft carriers were responsible for the attack on Pearl Harbor, launching a total of 353 aircraft against the base, although Arare did not play any direct role in the attack, having been performed only by air power. After the attack, Arare escorted the carriers to Kure, returning on the 24th.

In January 1942, Arare escorted aircraft carriers Akagi and Kaga to Truk, and onwards to Rabaul to cover landings of Japanese forces at Rabaul and Kavieng. She returned with Zuikaku from Palau to Yokosuka on 13 February, and spent the following month in training patrols. On 17 March, she departed Yokosuka with Shōkaku and Zuikaku to Staring-baai in Sulawesi, Netherlands East Indies.

On 1 March, Arare was present during the sinking of the Dutch cargo ship Modjokerto, but did not engage. She departed Staring-baai on 27 March to escort the carrier force in the Indian Ocean raid on 27 March After the Japanese air strikes on Colombo and Trincomalee in Ceylon, she returned to Kure for repairs on 23 April. Arare deployed from Saipan on 3 June as part of the escort for the troop convoy in the Battle of Midway. Afterwards, she escorted the cruisers Kumano and Suzuya from Truk back to Kure.

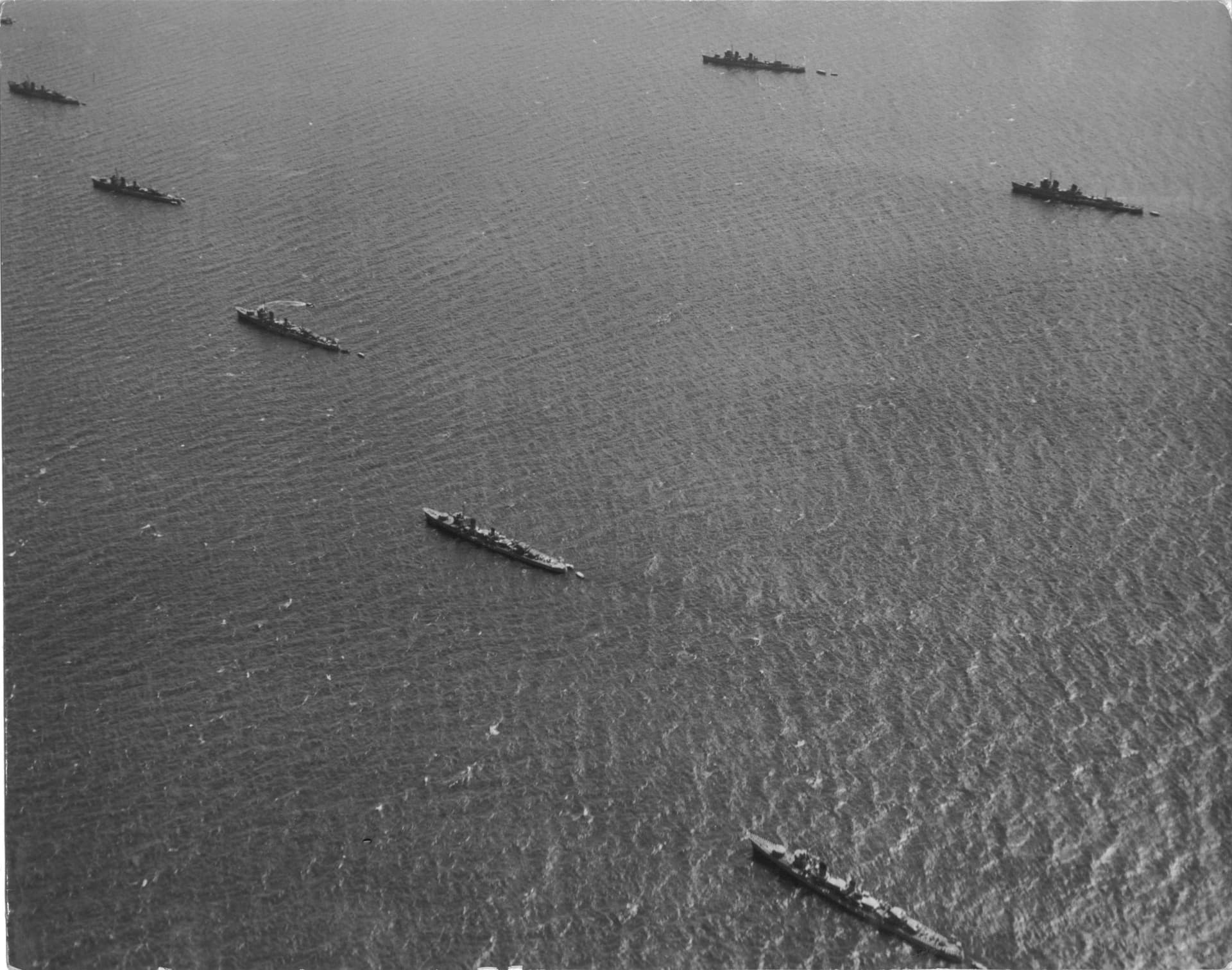
Japanese destroyers anchored off Yokohama during a fleet review, 11 October 1940. Arare is the second closest ship to the camera

On 28 June, she was assigned to escort Chiyoda to Kiska in the Aleutian Islands on a supply mission. While approximately 7 nautical miles (13 km; 8.1 mi) east of Kiska at 52°0′N 177°40′E on 5 July, during the action of 5 July 1942 she was hit amidships by a torpedo fired by the submarine USS Growler, exploded and sank, with loss of 104 lives. Commander Ogata was among the 42 survivors rescued by the destroyer Shiranui. She was removed from the navy list on 31 July 1942.
