= Japanese minesweeper Tama Maru (1936) =

Japanese auxiliary minesweeper

- Japanese auxiliary minesweeper Tama Maru (registration 42339)

History

Empire of Japan
- Name: Tama Maru
- Builder: Mitsubishi Jukogyo Kobe Zosensho
- Laid down: 28 May 1936
- Launched: 5 August 1936
- Sponsored by: Taiyo Hogei
- Completed: 28 September 1936
- Acquired: Requisitioned by Imperial Japanese Navy, 15 August 1941
- Stricken: 25 May 1942
- Identification: 42339
- Fate: Sunk, 6 May 1942
- Notes: Call sign: JGHL

General characteristics
- Class & type: Tama Maru-class
- Type: Auxiliary minesweeper
- Tonnage: 264 GRT
- Length: 36.5 m (119 ft 9 in) overall
- Beam: 7.3 m (23 ft 11 in)
- Draught: 4.1 m (13 ft 5 in)

Tama Maru (Japanese: 玉丸) was an auxiliary minesweeper of the Imperial Japanese Navy during World War II.

== History ==
Tama Maru was laid down on 28 May 1936 at the shipyard of Mitsubishi Jukogyo Kobe Zosensho at the behest of shipping company, Taiyo Hogei. She was launched on 5 August 1936 and completed 28 September 1936. She was the first of 8 ships built of her class (Tama Maru, Tama Maru No. 2, Tama Maru No. 3, Tama Maru No. 5, Tama Maru No. 6, Tama Maru No. 7, Tama Maru No. 8, Tama Maru No. 9 (later Nagato Maru)). On 15 August 1941, she was requisitioned by the Imperial Japanese Navy and converted to an auxiliary minesweeper under Reserve Lieutenant Shiihara.

She was assigned to the Port Moresby Operation (Operation MO) tasked with the occupation of the Australian Territory of New Guinea in order to isolate Australia and New Zealand from the United States. The operation was also to seize the islands of Tulagi and Samarai, and the Deboyne Islands (where seaplane bases were to be established) as well as Nauru and Banaba Island (due to their valuable phosphate deposits). Tama Maru was assigned to the Tulagi invasion force commanded by Rear Admiral Kiyohide Shima and consisting of the flagship minelayer/cruiser Okinoshima, 1 auxiliary minelayer (Kōei Maru), 2 destroyers (Kikuzuki and Yūzuki), 5 minesweepers (Tama Maru along with Wa-1, Wa-2, Hagoromo Maru, and Noshiro Maru No. 2), 2 subchasers (Toshi Maru No. 3, Tama Maru No. 8), and 1 transport (Azumasan Maru) carrying 400 men of the 3rd Kure Special Naval Landing Force. The light carrier Shōhō provided air support accompanied by 4 cruisers (Aoba, Kako, Kinugasa, Furutaka) and 1 destroyer (Sazanami). The force departed from Rabaul on 30 April 1942 and on 3 May 1942, landed on Tulagi unopposed. Shōhō with its escorts left the area to support the main Port Moresby operation which allowed planes from USS Yorktown of Task Force 17 under Rear Admiral Frank Jack Fletcher to attack the ships of the invasion force. On 4 May 1942, Tama Maru was patrolling with Wa-1 and Wa-2 north of Savo Island when it was spotted by a squadron of Douglas TBD Devastators from the Yorktown. Wa-1 and Wa-2 were immediately sunk while Tama Maru was significantly damaged and sank on 6 May 1942.

She was struck from the Navy list on 25 May 1942. The wreck lies in 74 m of water on a sandy bottom off Makafele Island.
