= Japanese minesweeper Wa-1 =

Imperial Japanese Navy warship

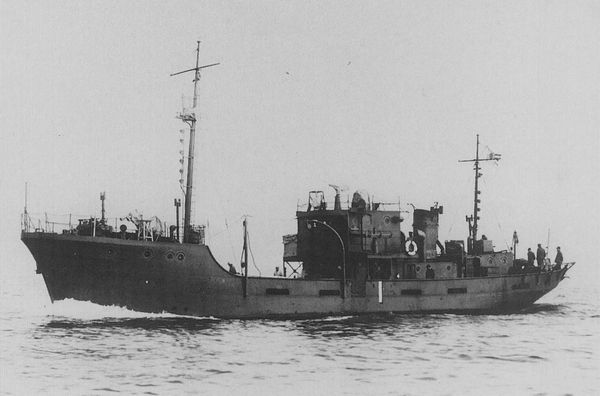
- Japanese minesweeper Wa-1

History

Empire of Japan
- Name: Wa-1
- Builder: Ōsaka Iron Works, Osaka
- Laid down: 30 June 1941
- Launched: 9 November 1941
- Completed: 31 January 1942
- Commissioned: 31 January 1942
- Stricken: 10 July 1942
- Notes: Call sign: JINQ

General characteristics
- Type: Minesweeper
- Displacement: 215 long tons (218 t) standard
- Length: 33.00 m (108 ft 3 in) overall
- Beam: 5.92 m (19 ft 5 in)
- Draught: 2.29 m (7 ft 6 in)
- Propulsion: 1 × Akasaka Model diesel; single shaft, 300 bhp
- Speed: 9.5 knots (10.9 mph; 17.6 km/h)
- Range: 1,500 nmi (2,800 km) at 9.5 kn (10.9 mph; 17.6 km/h)
- Complement: 43
- Armament: 1 × 76.2 mm (3 in) L/23.5 AA gun; 2 × 7.7 mm machine guns; 12 × depth charges; 1 × dunking hydrophone; 2 × paravanes

Wa-1 (Japanese: 第1号掃海特務艇) was the first No.1-class auxiliary minesweeper of the Imperial Japanese Navy during World War II.

== History ==
Wa-1 was the first of 22 No.1-class auxiliary minesweepers built for the Imperial Japanese Navy. Sources differ as to whether the class had wooden or steel hulls. The design was based on that of a fishing trawler and readily convertible to a fishing vessel after the war. She was laid down on 30 June 1941 at the Ōsaka Iron Works shipyard in the Sakurajima district (jp:桜島 (大阪市)) of Osaka. She was launched on 9 November 1941, and completed and commissioned on 31 January 1942. She was assigned to the Yokosuka Naval District where she patrolled the entrance to Tokyo Bay. On 23 April 1942, she was attached to the Port Moresby Operation (Operation MO) tasked with the occupation of the Australian Territory of New Guinea in order to isolate Australia and New Zealand from the United States. The operation was also to seize the islands of Tulagi and Samarai, and the Deboyne Islands (where seaplane bases were to be established) as well as Nauru and Banaba Island (due to their valuable phosphate deposits). Wa-1 was assigned to the Tulagi invasion force commanded by Rear Admiral Kiyohide Shima and consisting of the flagship minelayer/cruiser Okinoshima, auxiliary minelayer Kōei Maru, 2 destroyers (Kikuzuki and Yūzuki), 5 minesweepers (Wa-1 along with Wa-2, Hagoromo Maru, Noshiro Maru No. 2, and Tama Maru), 2 subchasers (Toshi Maru No. 3, Tama Maru No. 8), and 1 transport (Azumasan Maru) carrying 400 men of the 3rd Kure Special Naval Landing Force. The light carrier Shōhō provided air support accompanied by 4 cruisers (Aoba, Kako, Kinugasa, Furutaka) and 1 destroyer (Sazanami). The force departed from Rabaul on 30 April 1942 and on 3 May 1942, landed on Tulagi unopposed. Shōhō with its escorts left the area to support the main Port Moresby operation leaving the task force without air cover. After completing their mine-sweeping activities at Tulagi, Wa-1, Wa-2 and Tama Maru were en route to the Deboyne Islands when they were spotted by a squadron of Douglas TBD Devastators from USS Yorktown north of Savo Island. Wa-1 was hit by a 1,000-pound bomb and destroyed. Wa-2 suffered the same fate while Tama Maru was significantly damaged and sank on 6 May 1942. She was struck from the Naval List on 10 July 1942.

== Bibliography ==
- "Rekishi Gunzō"., History of Pacific War Vol.51 The truth histories of the Japanese Naval Vessels Part-2, Gakken (Japan), August 2005, ISBN 4-05-604083-4.
- Ships of the World special issue Vol.45, Escort Vessels of the Imperial Japanese Navy, "Kaijinsha"., (Japan), 1996.
- The Maru Special, Japanese Naval Vessels No.50, Japanese minesweepers and landing ships, "Ushio Shobō". (Japan), 1981.
