= Japanese minelayer Tsugaru =

Japanese minelayer

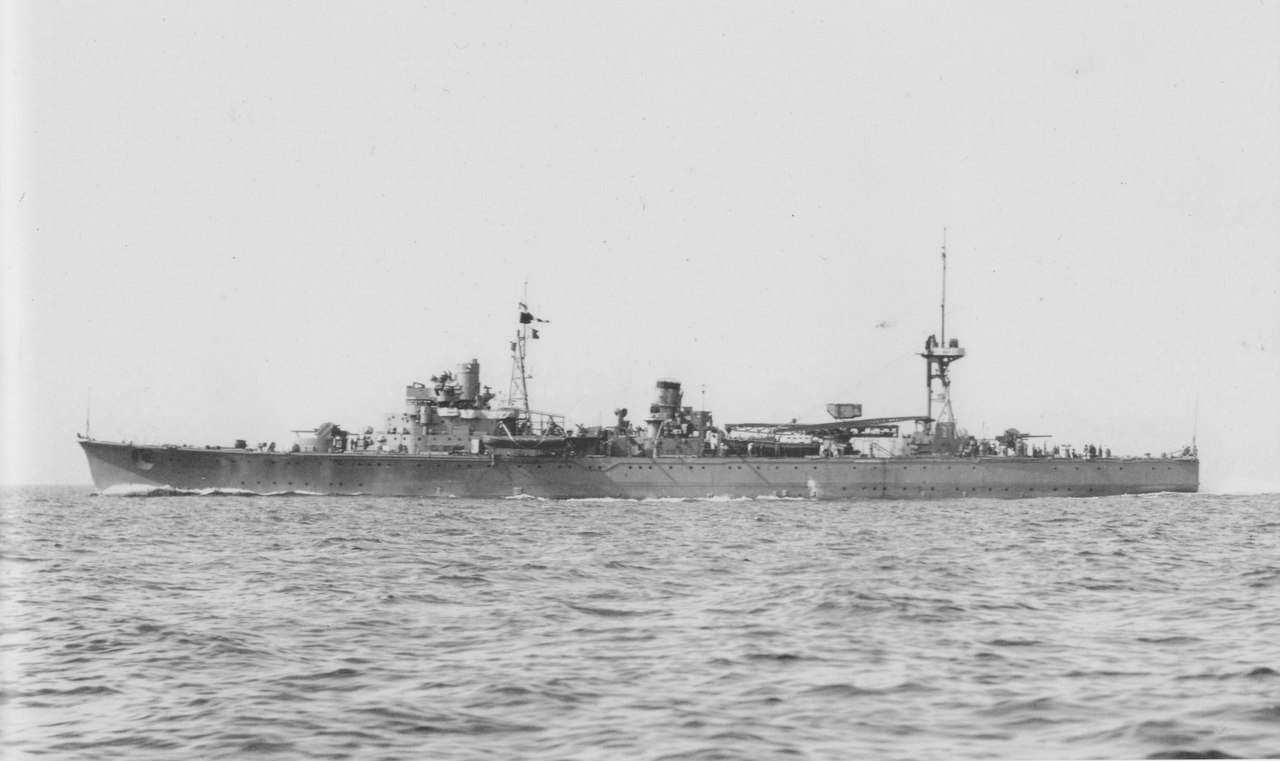
- Tsugaru in 1941

History

Japan
- Name: Tsugaru
- Namesake: Tsugaru Peninsula
- Ordered: fiscal 1937
- Builder: Yokosuka Naval Arsenal
- Laid down: 5 July 1939
- Launched: 5 June 1940
- Commissioned: 22 October 1941
- Stricken: 10 August 1944
- Fate: Torpedoed and sunk, 29 June 1944

General characteristics
- Type: minelayer
- Displacement: 4,000 long tons (4,064 t) (standard)
- Length: 113.6 m (372 ft 8 in) (pp); 124.5 m (408 ft 6 in) (waterline)
- Beam: 15.6 m (51 ft 2 in)
- Draught: 5.49 m (18 ft)
- Installed power: 4 boilers; 9,000 shp (6,700 kW)
- Propulsion: 2 shafts; 2 geared steam turbines
- Speed: 20 knots (37 km/h; 23 mph)
- Range: 9,000 nmi (17,000 km; 10,000 mi) at 10 knots (19 km/h; 12 mph)
- Complement: 445
- Armament: 4 × 127 mm (5 in) dual-purpose guns; 4 × 13 mm (0.51 in) AA guns; 500 × Type 6 naval mines; 1 × Type 94 depth charge thrower, 6 × DC rails
- Aircraft carried: 1 × Kawanishi E7K seaplane
- Aviation facilities: 1 catapult

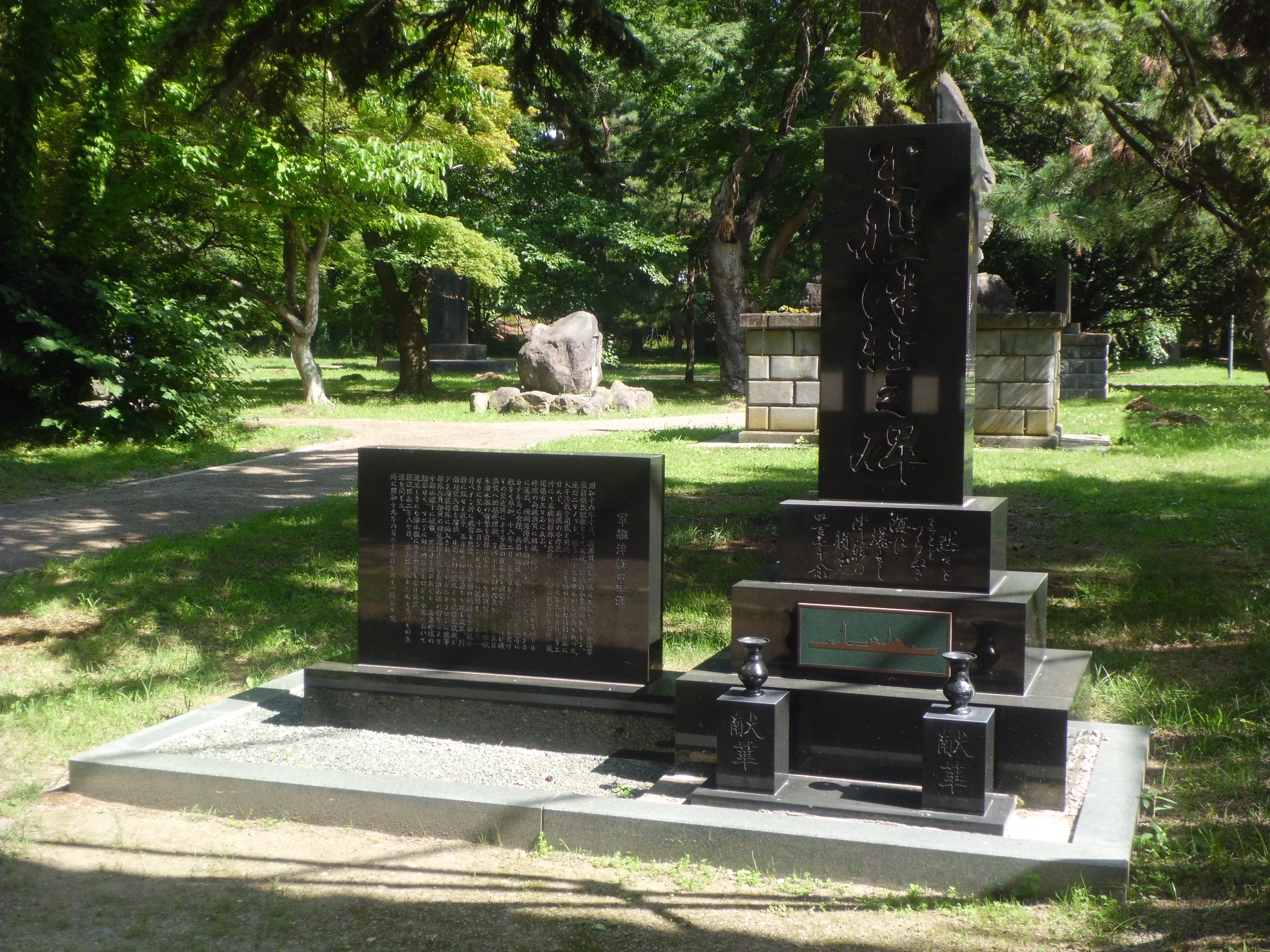
Memorial to the crew of the minelayer Tsugaru in Hirosaki, Aomori, Japan

Tsugaru (津軽) was a large minelayer of the Imperial Japanese Navy in service during the early stages of World War II. She was named after the Tsugaru Peninsula in northwest Aomori Prefecture of Japan. She was commissioned immediately before the start of World War II, and sunk by the American submarine USS Darter in June 1944.

== Building ==
Under the Maru-3 Supplementary Naval Expansion Budget of 1937, a new large minelayer incorporating design improvements realized through operational experience with Japanese minelayer Okinoshima was funded. In addition to carrying 600 Type 6 naval mines, the new ship was equipped with an aircraft catapult and carried a Kawanishi E7K reconnaissance seaplane. Physically very similar to Okinoshima in size, appearance and layout, her main armament was changed to four 127 mm Type 89 dual-purpose guns, intended to give Tsugaru better anti-aircraft (AA) capabilities than her predecessor.

Tsugaru was launched by the Yokosuka Naval Arsenal on 5 June 1940 and was commissioned into service on 22 October 1941.

== Operational history ==
After commissioning, Tsugaru was assigned to Admiral Kiyohide Shima’s Mine Division 19 under Admiral Shigeyoshi Inoue’s IJN 4th Fleet and deployed to Saipan. At the time of the attack on Pearl Harbor in December 1941, Tsugaru was assigned to support the invasion of Guam. Following the success of this mission, in January 1942, Tsugaru deployed from Jaluit with Okinoshima, under the overall command of Admiral Sadamichi Kajioka, to participate in “Operation R” (the invasion of Rabaul and Kavieng).

On 5 March, Tsugaru and Okinoshima, under the overall command of Admiral Kuninori Marumo, were assigned to “Operation SR” (the invasion of Lae and Salamaua in New Guinea). On 10 March, the invasion force was attacked by ninety United States Navy aircraft from USS Yorktown and USS Lexington, with Tsugaru suffering light damage.

On 4 May, Tsugaru was assigned to Admiral Shima's Tulagi invasion force, which was part of “Operation Mo” (the invasion of Tulagi and Port Moresby in New Guinea). However, the invasion plans were cancelled after the Battle of the Coral Sea, and Tsugaru was assigned instead to “Operation RY" (the invasion of Nauru and Ocean Island). This operation was also cancelled after the loss of Okinoshima on 12 May 1942, and Tsugaru was stationed at Rabaul.

On 14 July, Tsugaru was reassigned to Admiral Gunichi Mikawa's IJN 8th Fleet and supported “Operation RI” (the invasion of Buna in New Guinea). Subsequently, in August and September, Tsugaru was used on missions to supply reinforcements and equipment to Guadalcanal and was hit by bombs from United States Army Air Forces B-17 Flying Fortress bombers on 3 September, with 14 crewmen killed and 30 wounded. After repairs, she continued making transport runs to Guadalcanal, Shortland Island, New Georgia and Santa Isabel Island in the Solomon Islands until February 1943.

From March to May 1943, Tsugaru underwent repairs and refits at Yokosuka Naval Arsenal, returning to Rabaul in early August. However, en route to Rabaul, she was attacked by USS Silversides on 5 August, north northeast of Rabaul, with one torpedo hit. The damage was enough to warrant an immediate return to Truk for emergency repairs and a return to Yokosuka by mid-September, where she remained until the end of the year.

On 1 December 1943, Tsugaru was reassigned to the Third Southern Expeditionary Fleet. On 24 March 1944, she deployed from Palau to mine the Balabac Strait in the Philippines, after which she was stationed at Balikpapan in Borneo. One of the mines from this mission is credited with sinking USS Robalo in July 1944. On 31 May, Tsugaru was assigned to “Operation KON” (the Relief of Biak), transporting reinforcements from Zamboanga on Mindanao to counter the American landings. On 21 June, after departing Sorong, New Guinea, for Halmahera Island, Tsugaru was torpedoed by the Royal Netherlands Navy submarine HNLMS K XIV, which caused severe damage. After temporary repairs, she attempted to reach Manila but was sighted on 29 June near Biak by USS Darter, which fired a full spread of six torpedoes. Two hit Tsugaru, which sank at position 2°19′N 127°57′E less than 25 minutes later with loss of most of her crew including her captain. Tsugaru was removed from the navy list on 10 August 1944.
