= Operation RY =

1942 Japanese planned military offensive against the Australian territory of Nauru

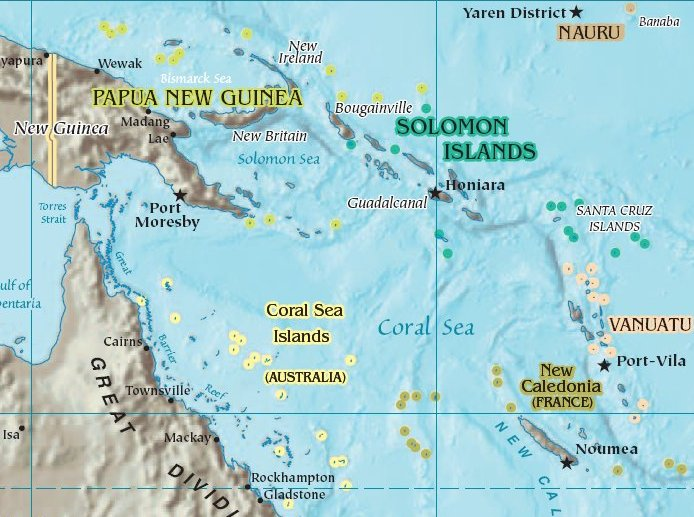
- Map of the Coral Sea area with Nauru and Ocean (Banaba) islands in the top right corner.
- Planned: April 1942
- Objective: Occupation of Nauru and Ocean islands
- Date: 10 May to 30 August 1942
- Executed by: Imperial Japanese Navy
- Outcome: Postponed on 15 May 1942; completed successfully on 29–30 August 1942
- Casualties: 1 minelayer, 1 auxiliary ship sunk

Operation RY was the Imperial Japanese plan to invade and occupy Nauru and Ocean Islands, in the South Pacific, during the Pacific conflict of World War II. The operation was originally set to be executed in May 1942 immediately following Operation MO and before Operation MI, the latter of which resulted in the Battle of Midway. The primary reason for the operation was to exploit the islands' supplies of phosphate. After a postponement because of interference by enemy forces, the operation was completed in August 1942.

== Background ==
Nauru and Ocean (now Banaba) Islands were isolated but rich with phosphate deposits, which were identified around 1900. Nauru was under Australian mandate control, and Ocean Island was headquarters of the British Gilbert and Ellice Islands Colony. In both places, the Melbourne-based British Phosphate Commissioners (BPC) had been running the phosphate mining since 1919, under the Nauru Island Agreement. The phosphate deposits were mined for making fertilisers, ammunition and explosives.

During the Second World War, the German auxiliary cruisers Orion and Komet sank five merchant ships and bombarded the island in early December 1940, causing damage to the phosphate mining and disrupting the Allied production of phosphate. Following the raids, the Australian Commonwealth Naval Board requested that the British Admiralty redeploy Australian naval units to meet the threat posed by raiders. The armed merchant cruiser HMAS Manoora arrived off Ocean Island on 4 January 1941, and Australian and New Zealand warships maintained a continual presence off the islands during the subsequent months. A naval company and two field guns were deployed to each island. The attacks also led to the introduction of convoys between Australia and New Zealand.

In late February 1942, as a Japanese invasion of Nauru and Ocean Islands was feared, the Free French destroyer Le Triomphant departed the New Hebrides to evacuate both places. The ship arrived on 23 February and completed the evacuation without serious incident.

Although Operation MO was cancelled on 8 May 1942, immediately following the Battle of the Coral Sea, the Imperial Japanese Navy forces departed Rabaul and Bougainville on 11 May to execute Operation RY.

== Failure of first attempt ==
On 11 May 1942, the Imperial Japanese invasion force departed Rabaul, under the command of Rear Admiral Shima Kiyohide and consisting of the cruiser Tatsuta, the minelayers Okinoshima (flagship) and Tsugaru and the destroyers Uzuki and Yūzuki, covered by the 5th Cruiser Division, under the command of Vice Admiral Takeo Takagi, consisting of the heavy cruisers Myōkō and Haguro with the Destroyer Division 30 destroyers Ariake, Mochizuki, Shigure and Shiratsuyu. The invasion troops from the 6th Special Naval Landing Force (SNLF) and Kashima SNLF were carried by the transports Kinryū Maru and Takahata Maru.

While steaming through driving rain off New Ireland and west of Buka Island, Okinoshima, which had been damaged by airplanes from Yorktown during the invasion of Tulagi on 4 May 1942, was torpedoed at 04:52 by the United States Navy submarine S-42 (Commander Oliver G. Kirk) and severely damaged. The invasion force's escorts closed S-42 and depth charged the area until 1130, causing damage. The submarine left the area to return to base at Moreton Bay, Brisbane. Shima transferred his flag to Yūzuki southwest of Buka Island, Bougainville. At 06:40, Okinoshima capsized under tow by Mochizuki in St. George's Channel at 05°06′S 153°48′E.

While returning to Rabaul after being dispatched to assist repair work on Okinoshima, the repair ship Shoei Maru was torpedoed off Cape St George, New Ireland, by S-44. She sank at 1440 at 04°51′S 152°54′E.

In spite of the loss of Okinoshima, the rest of the Japanese forces continued with the operation. As those forces were en route, however, a Japanese reconnaissance aircraft from Tulagi sighted the United States Navy aircraft carriers USS Enterprise and Hornet heading towards Nauru. The two American carriers, acting on intelligence obtained from intercepted Japanese communications, had been sent to the area as a feint to try to stop the Japanese operation.

The feint was successful. Fearing the threat posed by the US carriers to the RY forces, which did not have air cover, the Japanese cancelled the operation on 15 May, and the naval forces returned to Rabaul.

== Success at second attempt ==
A second invasion force departed Truk on 26 August 1942, consisting of the cruiser Yūbari, the destroyers Oite, Yūzuki, Ariake, Yūgure and Yūnagi, and the transport Hakozaki Maru.

The landing forces landed unopposed on Nauru on 29 August and on Ocean Island on 30 August.

== Occupation ==
Japanese forces occupied the two islands until the end of the war but became increasingly isolated as the war progressed.

During the Japanese occupation of Nauru, American aircraft repeatedly bombed the island's facilities.

== Sources ==
=== Books ===
- Brown, David (1990). Warship Losses of World War Two. Naval Institute Press. ISBN 1-55750-914-X.
- Lundstrom, John B. (2006). Black Shoe Carrier Admiral: Frank Jack Fletcher at Coral Sea, Midway, and Guadalcanal. Annapolis, Maryland: Naval Institute Press. ISBN 1-59114-475-2.
- Lundstrom, John B. (2005). The First Team: Pacific Naval Air Combat from Pearl Harbor to Midway (New ed.). Annapolis, Maryland, U.S.A.: Naval Institute Press. ISBN 1-59114-471-X.
- Willmott, H. P. (2002). The War with Japan: The Period of Balance, May 1942 – October 1943. Wilmington, Delaware: Scholarly Resources Inc. ISBN 0-8420-5032-9.

=== Web ===
- Japanese army operations in the South Pacific Area New Britain and Papua campaigns, 1942–43. Translated by Bullard, Steven. Canberra: Australian War Memorial. 2007. ISBN 978-0-9751904-8-7. (translation of excerpts from the Senshi Sōshō)
- Hackett, Bob; Kingsepp, Sander (2003). "IJN Furutaka: Tabular Record of Movement". Junyokan. Combinedfleet.com.
- Hackett, Bob, Sander Kingsepp, and Peter Cundall (1998–2007). "IJN Myoko: Tabular Record of Movement". Junyokan!. Combinedfleet.com.
- Hackett, Bob, and Sander Kingsepp (1998–2007). "IJN Minelayer Okinoshima: Tabular Record of Movement". Fusetsukan!. Combinedfleet.com.
- Hackett, Bob, Sander Kingsepp, and Peter Cundall (1998–2007). "IJN Tatsuta: Tabular Record of Movement". Junyokan!. Combinedfleet.com.
- Hackett, Bob, Sander Kingsepp, and Peter Cundall (1998–2007). "IJN Tsugaru: Tabular Record of Movement". Fusetsukan!. Combinedfleet.com.
- McCarthy, Dudley (1959). Volume V – South–West Pacific Area – First Year: Kokoda to Wau. Australia in the War of 1939–1945, Series 1: Army. Canberra: Australian War Memorial. Archived from the original on 25 May 2009.
- Nevitt, Allyn D. (1998–2009). "IJN Uzuki: Tabular Record of Movement". Long Lancers!. Combinedfleet.com.
