= Invasion of Tulagi =

Invasion of Tulagi may refer to:

- Invasion of Tulagi (May 1942), the Japanese invasion of Tulagi in May 1942
- Battle of Tulagi and Gavutu–Tanambogo, the Allied liberation of Tulagi in August 1942

== See also ==
- The Pacific War
