= Operation FS =

1942 Japanese planned military offensive in the South Pacific

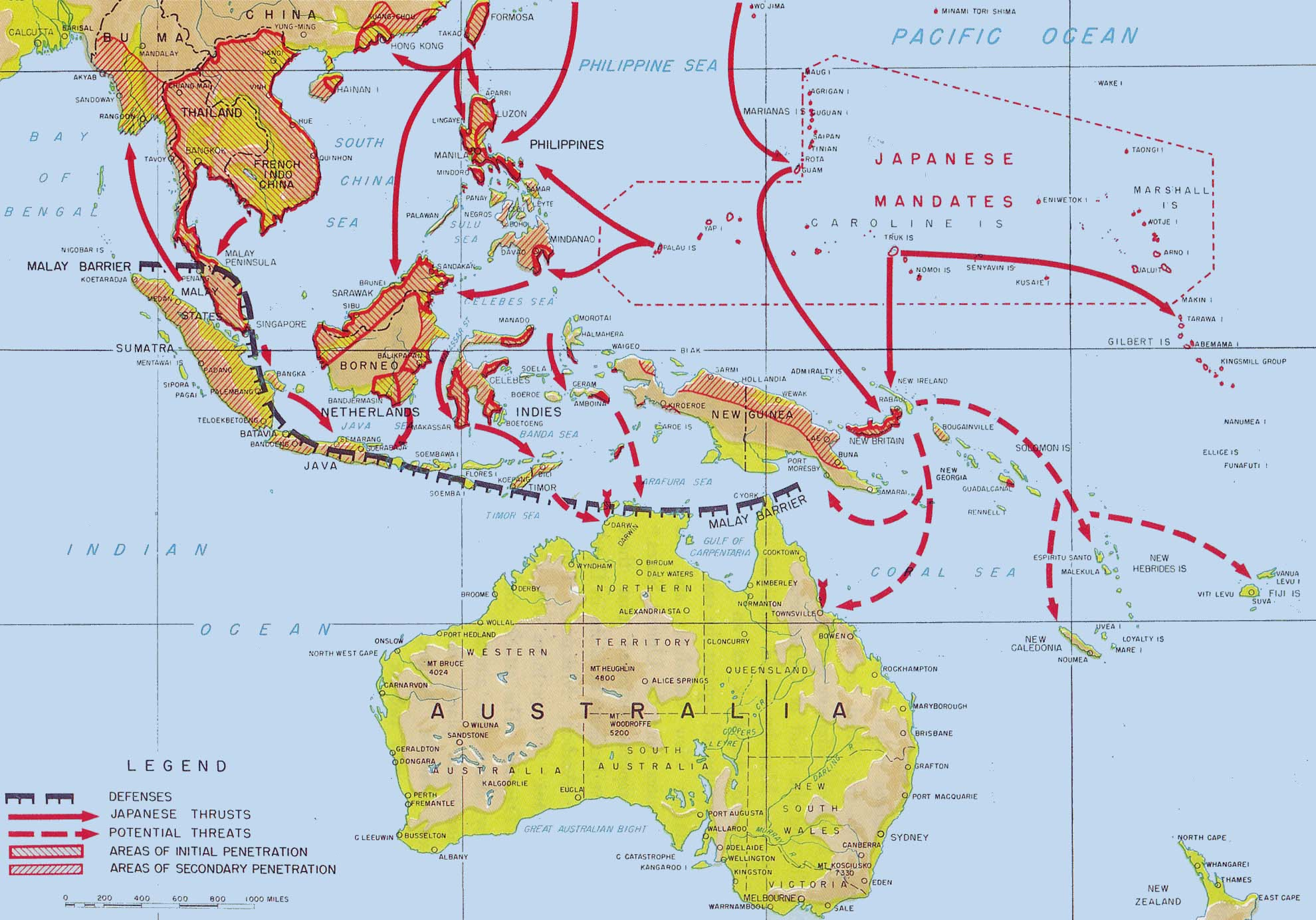
- Imperial Japanese advances in the Southwest Pacific and Southeast Asia areas during the first five months of the Pacific campaign
- Planned: July–August 1942
- Objective: Occupation of Fiji, American Samoa, Samoa, and New Caledonia
- Outcome: Cancelled in June 1942

Operation FS was the Imperial Japanese plan to invade and occupy Fiji, American Samoa, Samoa, and New Caledonia in the South Pacific during the Pacific conflict of World War II. The operation was set to be executed in July or August 1942 following Operation MO, Operation RY, and Operation MI.

FS was to be a joint effort between the Imperial Japanese Navy and the Imperial Japanese Army. The primary goal of Operation FS was to, following the completion of MO, RY, and MI, cut the supply and communication lines between Australia and the United States, with the goal of reducing or eliminating Australia as a base to threaten Japan's perimeter defenses in the South Pacific.

Operation FS was postponed following the Japanese setback at the Battle of the Coral Sea, then cancelled after the Japanese defeat at the Battle of Midway, following the losses of four Japanese fleet carriers. The land forces originally dedicated for Operation FS, namely the 17th Army, were instead reassigned to a subsequently unsuccessful reattempt to take Port Moresby, part of the original goal for Operation MO, and to defend the Solomon Islands from Allied offensives.

== See also ==
- Proposed Japanese invasion of Australia during World War II

== Bibliography ==
=== Books ===
- Dull, Paul S. (1978). A Battle History of the Imperial Japanese Navy, 1941-1945. Naval Institute Press. ISBN 0-87021-097-1.
- Hayashi, Saburo (1959). Kogun: The Japanese Army in the Pacific War. Marine Corps Association. ASIN B000ID3YRK.
- Lundstrom, John B. (2006). Black Shoe Carrier Admiral: Frank Jack Fletcher at Coral Sea, Midway, and Guadalcanal. Annapolis, Maryland: Naval Institute Press. ISBN 1-59114-475-2.
- Parshall, Jonathan; Tully, Anthony (2005). Shattered Sword: The Untold Story of the Battle of Midway. Dulles, VA: Potomac Books. ISBN 1-57488-923-0.
- Rottman, Gordon L. (2005). Japanese Army in World War II: Conquest of the Pacific 1941-42. Oxford: Osprey. ISBN 1-84176-789-1.
- Willmott, H. P. (1983). The Barrier and the Javelin: Japanese and Allied Pacific Strategies February to June 1942. Annapolis, Maryland: Naval Institute Press. ISBN 0-87021-535-3.
- Willmott, H. P. (2002). The War with Japan: The Period of Balance, May 1942 – October 1943. Wilmington, Delaware: Scholarly Resources Inc. ISBN 0-8420-5032-9.

=== Web ===
- Japanese army operations in the South Pacific Area New Britain and Papua campaigns, 1942–43. Translated by Bullard, Steven. Canberra: Australian War Memorial. 2007. ISBN 978-0-9751904-8-7.
- Japanese Operations in the Southwest Pacific Area, Volume II - Part I. Reports of General MacArthur. United States Army Center of Military History. 1994. Archived from the original on 2009-02-08.
