= Japanese destroyer Kiri (1944) =

Destroyer of the Imperial Japanese Navy

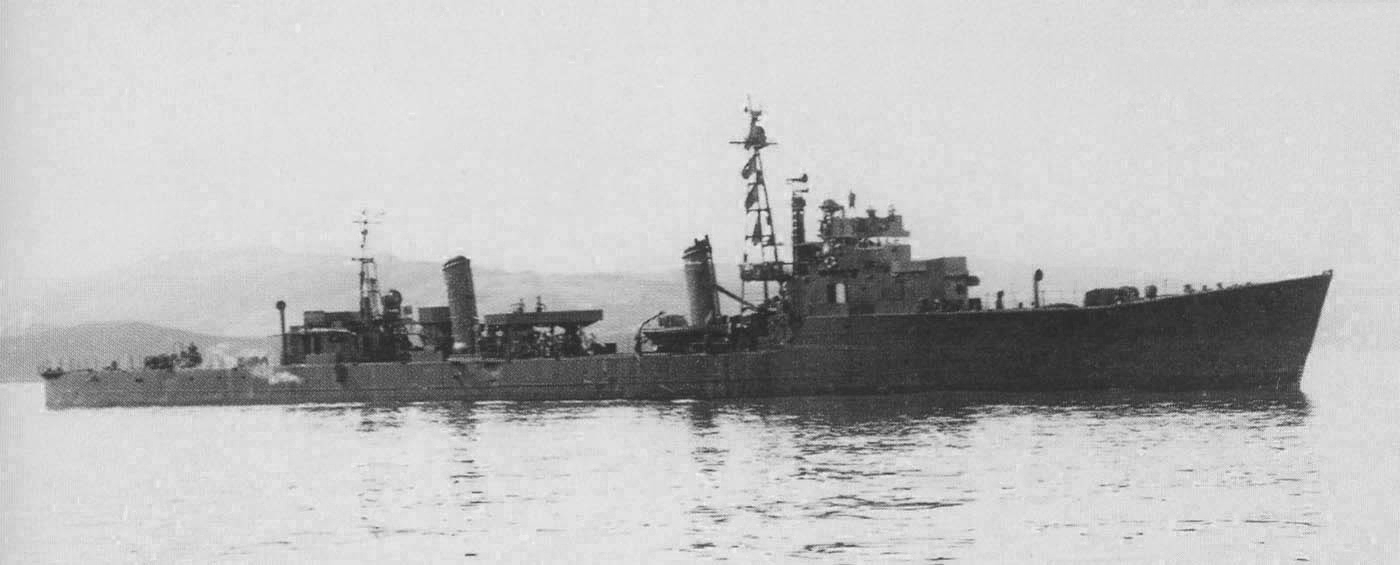
- Kiri after the war, 1945

History

Empire of Japan
- Name: Kiri
- Namesake: Paulownia
- Builder: Yokosuka Naval Arsenal
- Laid down: 1 February 1944
- Launched: 27 May 1944
- Completed: 14 August 1944
- Stricken: 5 October 1945
- Fate: Transferred to the Soviet Navy, 29 July 1947

Soviet Union
- Name: Kiri
- Acquired: 29 July 1947
- Commissioned: July 1947
- Renamed: Vozrozhdionny (Возрождённый (Resurrected)), July 1947; TsL-25, 17 June 1949; PM-65, 3 October 1957
- Reclassified: Target ship, 17 June 1949; Floating workshop, 16 September 1957
- Stricken: 20 December 1969
- Fate: Scrapped after 20 December 1969

General characteristics (as built)
- Class & type: Matsu-class escort destroyer
- Displacement: 1,282 t (1,262 long tons) (standard)
- Length: 100 m (328 ft 1 in) (o/a)
- Beam: 9.35 m (30 ft 8 in)
- Draft: 3.3 m (10 ft 10 in)
- Installed power: 2 × water-tube boilers; 19,000 shp (14,000 kW)
- Propulsion: 2 shafts, 2 × geared steam turbines
- Speed: 27.8 knots (51.5 km/h; 32.0 mph)
- Range: 4,680 nmi (8,670 km; 5,390 mi) at 16 knots (30 km/h; 18 mph)
- Complement: 210
- Sensors & processing systems: 1 × Type 22 search radar; 1 × Type 13 early-warning radar
- Armament: 1 × twin, 1 × single 127 mm (5 in) DP guns; 4 × triple, 13 × single 25 mm (1 in) AA guns; 1 × quadruple 610 mm (24 in) torpedo tubes; 2 × rails, 2 × throwers for 36 depth charges

Kiri (桐; "Paulownia") was one of 18 Matsu-class escort destroyers built for the Imperial Japanese Navy (IJN) during World War II. Completed in mid-1944, the ship played a minor role in the Battle off Cape Engaño in October and began escorting convoys the following month. She was moderately damaged by American aircraft while escorting a troop convoy in December. Kiri returned to Japan in January 1945 for repairs and escorted a convoy to Japanese Formosa later that month. Her activities for the rest of the war are unknown.

The ship was surrendered to the Allies at the end of the war and used to repatriate Japanese troops until 1947. Mid-year the destroyer was turned over to the Soviet Union and was commissioned into the Soviet Navy. She was renamed Vozrozhdionny (Возрождённый (Resurrected)). When the ship was converted into a target ship in 1949, she was renamed TsL-25. The vessel was hulked and renamed PM-65 in 1957 and ordered to be scrapped in 1969.

== Design and description ==
Designed for ease of production, the Matsu class was smaller, slower and more lightly armed than previous destroyers as the IJN intended them for second-line duties like escorting convoys, releasing the larger ships for missions with the fleet. The ships measured 100 meters (328 ft 1 in) long overall, with a beam of 9.35 meters (30 ft 8 in) and a draft of 3.3 meters (10 ft 10 in). Their crew numbered 210 officers and enlisted men. They displaced 1,282 metric tons (1,262 long tons) at standard load and 1,554 metric tons (1,529 long tons) at deep load. The ships had two Kampon geared steam turbines, each driving one propeller shaft, using steam provided by two Kampon water-tube boilers. The turbines were rated at a total of 19,000 shaft horsepower (14,000 kW) for a speed of 27.8 knots (51.5 km/h; 32.0 mph). The Matsus had a range of 4,680 nautical miles (8,670 km; 5,390 mi) at 16 knots (30 km/h; 18 mph).

The main armament of the Matsu-class ships consisted of three 127-millimeter (5 in) Type 89 dual-purpose guns in one twin-gun mount aft and one single mount forward of the superstructure. The single mount was partially protected against spray by a gun shield. The accuracy of the Type 89 guns was severely reduced against aircraft because no high-angle gunnery director was fitted. The ships carried a total of twenty-five 25-millimeter (1 in) Type 96 anti-aircraft guns in 4 triple and 13 single mounts. The Matsus were equipped with Type 13 early-warning and Type 22 surface-search radars. The ships were also armed with a single rotating quadruple mount amidships for 610-millimeter (24 in) torpedoes. They could deliver their 36 depth charges via two stern rails and two throwers.

== Construction and career ==
Authorized in the late 1942 Modified 5th Naval Armaments Supplement Program, Kiri (Paulownia) was laid down on 1 February 1944 at the Yokosuka Naval Arsenal and launched on 27 May. Upon her completion on 14 August, the ship was assigned to Destroyer Squadron 11 of the Combined Fleet for training. The ship was assigned to Destroyer Division 43, Escort Squadron 31 of the Combined Fleet on 30 September and participated in the Battle off Cape Engaño on 25 October as part of Vice-Admiral Jisaburō Ozawa's Northern Force. Kiri was part of the escort force for the hybrid aircraft carrier/battleships Hyūga and Ise from Kure to Manila, the Philippines in early November, but she was diverted to the Spratly Islands instead. From 16 to 20 November, the ship escorted the 2nd Fleet from occupied Brunei to Mako (now Magong) in the Pescadore Islands.

Escort Squadron 31 was transferred to the 5th Fleet on 20 November and the destroyer was slightly damaged the following day. Kiri helped to escort a convoy from Japanese Formosa to Manila, where she arrived on 8 December. She escorted a troop convoy from Manila to Ormoc and back on 9–13 December. The ship was moderately damaged by strafing American aircraft on 12 December and she rescued 214 survivors from the destroyer Yūzuki. Kiri escorted convoys from Manila to Moji, Kyūshū, via Formosa from 14 December to 8 January 1945. The ship arrived at Kure for repairs two days later. She escorted Convoy MOTA-33 from Moji to Keelung, Formosa, beginning on 22 January and later ended up in Shanghai, China. The squadron was assigned to the 2nd Fleet from 15 March to 20 April and then rejoined the Combined Fleet. The ship was turned over to Allied forces at Kure at the time of the surrender of Japan on 2 September and was stricken from the navy list on 5 October. The destroyer was disarmed and used to repatriate Japanese personnel in 1945–1947. Kiri was turned over to the Soviet Union on 29 July of the latter year at Nakhodka.

The ship was commissioned into the Soviet Navy's Fifth Fleet and renamed Vozrozhdionny. She was disarmed, converted into a target ship and renamed TsL-25 on 17 June 1949. The ship was transferred to the Pacific Fleet on 23 April 1953. TsL-25 was hulked and converted into a floating workshop on 16 September 1957. The ship was renamed PM-65 on 3 October, stricken from the navy list on 20 December 1969, and ordered to be scrapped.

== Bibliography ==
- Berezhnoy, Sergey (1994). Трофеи и репарации ВМФ СССР [Trophies and Reparations of the Soviet Navy] (in Russian). Yakutsk: Sakhapoligrafizdat. OCLC 33334505.
- Dodson, Aidan & Cant, Serena (2020). Spoils of War: The Fate of Enemy Fleets after Two World Wars. Barnsley, UK: Seaforth Publishing. ISBN 978-1-5267-4198-1.
- Jentschura, Hansgeorg; Jung, Dieter & Mickel, Peter (1977). Warships of the Imperial Japanese Navy, 1869–1945. Annapolis, Maryland: United States Naval Institute. ISBN 0-87021-893-X.
- Nevitt, Allyn D. (16 January 2012). "IJN Kiri: Tabular Record of Movement". www.combinedfleet.com.
- Rohwer, Jürgen (2005). Chronology of the War at Sea 1939–1945: The Naval History of World War Two (Third Revised ed.). Annapolis, Maryland: Naval Institute Press. ISBN 1-59114-119-2.
- Stille, Mark (2013). Imperial Japanese Navy Destroyers 1919–45 (2): Asahio to Tachibana Classes. Botley, UK: Osprey Publishing. ISBN 978-1-84908-987-6.
- Sturton, Ian (1980). "Japan". In Chesneau, Roger (ed.). Conway's All the World's Fighting Ships 1922–1946. Greenwich, UK: Conway Maritime Press. ISBN 0-85177-146-7.
- Whitley, M. J. (1988). Destroyers of World War Two: An International Encyclopedia. Annapolis, Maryland: Naval Institute Press. ISBN 0-87021-326-1.
