= No.1-class auxiliary minesweeper =

Class of minesweepers of the Imperial Japanese Navy (IJN)

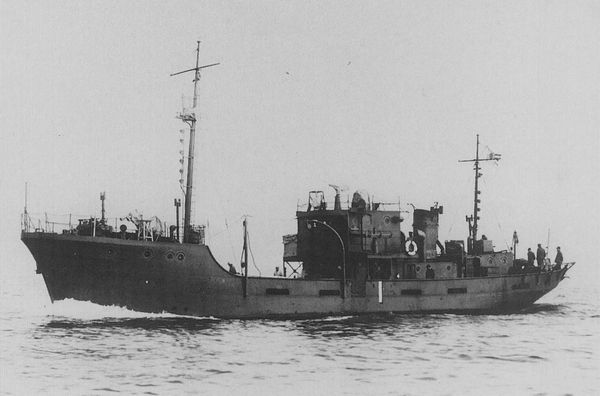
- Auxiliary Minesweeper No.1 in January 1942

Class overview
- Name: No.1 class auxiliary minesweeper
- Builders: Hitachi Zōsen Corporation; Namura Shipbuilding Corporation; Naniwa Dock Company; Ōsaka Iron Works; Sanoyasu Dock Company
- Operators: Imperial Japanese Navy; Soviet Navy; Republic of China Navy; People's Liberation Army Navy
- Built: 1941–1943
- In commission: 1942–1945 (IJN)
- Planned: 22
- Completed: 22
- Lost: 7
- Retired: 15

General characteristics
- Type: Minesweeper
- Displacement: 215 long tons (218 t) standard
- Length: 33.00 m (108 ft 3 in) overall
- Beam: 5.92 m (19 ft 5 in)
- Draught: 2.29 m (7 ft 6 in)
- Propulsion: 1 × Akasaka Model diesel; single shaft, 300 bhp
- Speed: 9.5 knots (10.9 mph; 17.6 km/h)
- Range: 1,500 nmi (2,800 km) at 9.5 kn (10.9 mph; 17.6 km/h)
- Complement: 43
- Armament: 1 × 76.2 mm (3.00 in) L/23.5 AA gun; 2 × 7.7 mm machine guns; 12 × depth charges; 1 × dunking hydrophone; 2 × paravanes

The No.1 class auxiliary minesweeper (第一号型掃海特務艇,, Dai Ichi Gō-gata Sōkai-Tokumutei) was a class of minesweepers of the Imperial Japanese Navy (IJN), serving during World War II. 22 vessels were planned and built in 1941–43 under the Maru Rin Programme (Ship # 251–256) and the Maru Kyū Programme (Ship # 480–495).

== Background ==
- In 1938, the IJN was troubled by drifting contact mines from the National Revolutionary Army at Yangtze River. The IJN dispatched a lot of minesweepers and paravane equipment vessels (minelayers, torpedo boats and more) to Yangtze River, but they were damaged by a drifting contact mines too.
- The IJN wanted a small and light-footed minesweepers. The IJN already commandeered a lot of fishing boats and gave minesweeping operations to them. The Kampon designed minesweeper similar to the trawlers. It is No.1-class auxiliary minesweeper (Project Number I5).
- They have begun to be commissioned from 1942. However, all of them was dispatched to Pacific front, and they were no match for the magnetic mine because their hull was made by steel.

== Ships in class ==
| Ship # | Ship | Builder | Laid down | Launched | Completed | Fate |
| 251 | Aux. Minesweeper No.1 | Ōsaka Iron Works | 30 June 1941 | 9 November 1941 | 31 January 1942 | Sunk by air raid off Savo Island on 4 May 1942. Decommissioned on 25 May 1942. |
| 252 | Aux. Minesweeper No.2 | Ōsaka Iron Works | 30 June 1941 | 9 November 1941 | 28 February 1942 | Sunk by air raid off Savo Island on 4 May 1942. Decommissioned on 25 May 1942. |
| 253 | Aux. Minesweeper No.3 | Ōsaka Iron Works | 20 June 1941 | 31 March 1942 | 30 May 1942 | MIA on 24 July 1945. Decommissioned on 3 May 1947. |
| 254 | Aux. Minesweeper No.4 | Naniwa Dock Company | 20 June 1941 | 19 March 1942 | 29 June 1942 | Sunk by air raid off Timor Island 08°38′S 125°26′E on 19 July 1944. Decommissioned on 10 September 1944. |
| 255 | Aux. Minesweeper No.5 | Ōsaka Iron Works | 20 June 1941 | 31 March 1942 | 30 June 1942 | Survived war at Chuuk Islands. Decommissioned in 1947. |
| 256 | Aux. Minesweeper No.6 | Naniwa Dock Company | 20 February 1942 | 18 July 1942 | 30 October 1942 | Sunk by air raid at Yamada Bay on 10 August 1945. Decommissioned on 20 October 1945. |
| 480 | Aux. Minesweeper No.7 | Ōsaka Iron Works | 10 February 1942 | 16 July 1942 | 28 December 1942 | Survived war at Singapore. Surrendered to United Kingdom in July 1946. Decommissioned in 1947. |
| 481 | Aux. Minesweeper No.8 | Ōsaka Iron Works | 10 February 1942 | 16 July 1942 | 31 January 1943 | Sunk by air raid at Visayan Sea 11°30′N 123°20′E on 21 October 1944. Decommissioned on 10 May 1945. |
| 482 | Aux. Minesweeper No.9 | Namura Shipbuilding | 20 March 1942 | 15 August 1942 | 30 November 1942 | Survived war at Singapore. Surrendered to United Kingdom in July 1946. Decommissioned in 1947. |
| 483 | Aux. Minesweeper No.10 | Sanoyasu Dock Company | 3 March 1942 | 19 August 1942 | 30 November 1942 | Sunk by USN destroyer off Vigan on 12 January 1945. Decommissioned on 10 May 1945. |
| 484 | Aux. Minesweeper No.11 | Naniwa Dock Company | 6 April 1942 | 30 August 1942 | 24 February 1943 | Survived war. Decommissioned on 30 November 1945. Surrendered to United Kingdom on 14 November 1947. |
| 485 | Aux. Minesweeper No.12 | Naniwa Dock Company | 7 September 1942 | 27 December 1942 | 31 March 1943 | Survived war. Decommissioned on 30 November 1945. Surrendered to Soviet Union on 3 October 1947. |
| 486 | Aux. Minesweeper No.13 | Hitachi Zōsen | 21 July 1942 | 25 January 1943 | 14 April 1943 | Survived war. Decommissioned on 30 November 1945. Surrendered to United States on 1 October 1947. Sunk as target at 35°10′N 123°52′E on 12 February 1948. |
| 487 | Aux. Minesweeper No.14 | Hitachi Zōsen | 21 July 1942 | 25 January 1943 | 14 May 1943 | Survived war. Decommissioned on 30 November 1945. Surrendered to Republic of China on 3 October 1947 and renamed Sao Lei 201. Defected to People's Liberation Army on 17 February 1949 and renamed Qiu Feng. Decommissioned in 1976. |
| 488 | Aux. Minesweeper No.15 | Namura Shipbuilding | 29 August 1942 | 25 January 1943 | 30 April 1943 | Survived war. Decommissioned on 30 November 1945. |
| 489 | Aux. Minesweeper No.16 | Sanoyasu Dock Company | 24 August 1942 | 19 December 1942 | 31 March 1943 | Survived war. Decommissioned on 30 November 1945. Surrendered to United Kingdom on 14 November 1947. |
| 490 | Aux. Minesweeper No.17 | Naniwa Dock Company | 7 September 1942 | 12 March 1943 | 28 May 1943 | Survived war. Decommissioned on 30 November 1945. Surrendered to Soviet Union on 3 October 1947. |
| 491 | Aux. Minesweeper No.18 | Namura Shipbuilding | 15 February 1943 | 16 May 1943 | 31 July 1943 | Survived war. Decommissioned on 30 November 1945. Surrendered to United States on 3 October 1947. Sunk as target at 35°16′N 123°20′E on 21 January 1948. |
| 492 | Aux. Minesweeper No.19 | Sanoyasu Dock Company | 25 December 1942 | 25 March 1943 | 30 June 1943 | Survived war. Decommissioned on 30 November 1945. Surrendered to Republic of China on 3 October 1947 and renamed Sao Lei 202. Renamed Jiang Yong (YP-542) in 1952. Decommissioned in 1968. Scrapped. |
| 493 | Aux. Minesweeper No.20 | Naniwa Dock Company | 5 February 1943 | 27 April 1943 | 31 July 1943 | Survived war. Decommissioned on 30 November 1945. Surrendered to Soviet Union on 3 October 1947. |
| 494 | Aux. Minesweeper No.21 | Hitachi Zōsen | 16 October 1942 | 11 March 1943 | 15 June 1943 | Survived war. Decommissioned on 30 November 1945. Surrendered to United States on 1 October 1947. Sunk as target at 35°24′N 123°56′E on 30 October 1947. |
| 495 | Aux. Minesweeper No.22 | Namura Shipbuilding | 20 May 1943 | 5 July 1943 | 20 October 1943 | Survived war. Decommissioned on 30 November 1945. Surrendered to Republic of China on 3 October 1947 and renamed Sao Lei 203. Renamed Jiang Yi (YP-541) in 1952. Decommissioned in 1968. Scrapped. |

== Photos ==
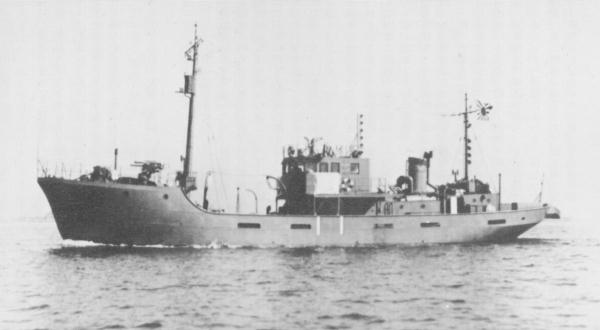
Auxiliary Minesweeper No.11 on 24 February 1943 at Osaka Bay.

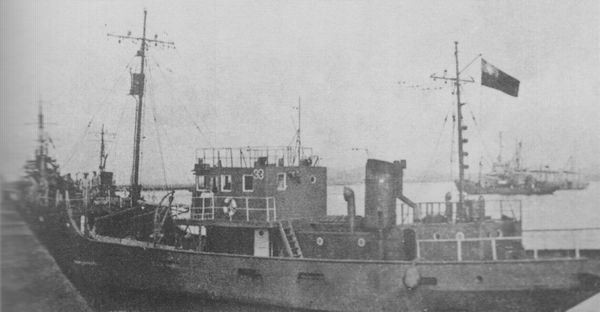
ROCS Sao Lei 202 in 1947.

== Bibliography ==
- "Rekishi Gunzō"., History of Pacific War Vol.51 The truth histories of the Japanese Naval Vessels Part-2, Gakken (Japan), August 2005, ISBN 4-05-604083-4.
- Ships of the World special issue Vol.45, Escort Vessels of the Imperial Japanese Navy, "Kaijinsha"., (Japan), 1996.
- The Maru Special, Japanese Naval Vessels No.50, Japanese minesweepers and landing ships, "Ushio Shobō". (Japan), 1981.
