= 3rd Kure Special Naval Landing Force =

The 3rd Kure Special Naval Landing Force (3rd Kure SNLF) were two infantry battalions of the Imperial Japanese Navy's Special Naval Landing Forces.

Both units were formed at the Kure Naval District. The first iteration of the unit saw action in China in the late 1930s. The second was formed in 1942, participating in the invasion of Tulagai and Milne Bay.
