= Japanese minelayer Okinoshima =

Imperial Japanese Navy minelayer

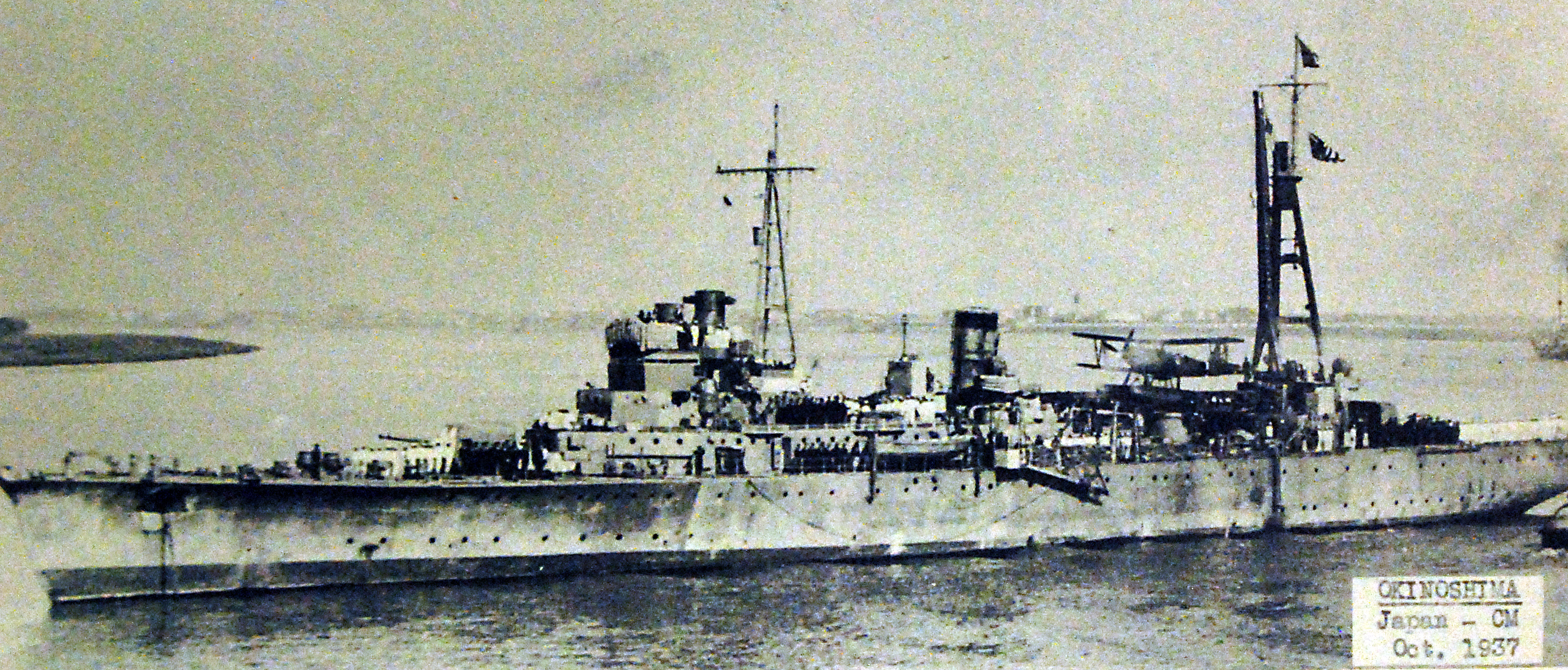
- Okinoshima in 1937

History

Empire of Japan
- Name: Okinoshima
- Namesake: Okinoshima Island
- Ordered: fiscal 1931
- Builder: Harima Shipyards
- Laid down: 27 September 1934
- Launched: 24 November 1935
- Commissioned: 30 September 1936
- Stricken: 25 May 1942
- Fate: Torpedoed and sunk, 12 May 1942

General characteristics
- Type: Minelayer
- Displacement: 4,290 long tons (4,359 t) (standard)
- Length: 113 m (370 ft 9 in) (pp); 119.29 m (391 ft 4 in) (waterline)
- Beam: 15.74 m (51 ft 8 in)
- Draught: 5.49 m (18 ft)
- Installed power: 4 boilers; 9,000 shp (6,700 kW)
- Propulsion: 2 shafts; 2 geared steam turbines
- Speed: 20 knots (37 km/h; 23 mph)
- Range: 9,000 nmi (17,000 km; 10,000 mi) at 10 knots (19 km/h; 12 mph)
- Complement: 445
- Armament: 4 × 14 cm/50 3rd Year Type naval guns; 2 × Type 3 80 mm AA Gun; 2 × Type 93 13 mm AA guns; 500 × Type 6 naval mines; 22 × depth charges
- Aircraft carried: 1 × Kawanishi E7K seaplane
- Aviation facilities: 1 aircraft catapult

Okinoshima (沖島) was a large minelayer of the Imperial Japanese Navy (IJN), which was in service during the early stages of World War II. She was named after the Okinoshima Island in the Sea of Japan. She was the largest purpose-built minelayer in the IJN and the first Japanese minelayer to be equipped with a reconnaissance seaplane.

== Building ==
Following the ratification of the London Naval Treaty, the Imperial Japanese Navy decided to retire its existing obsolete minelayers, the former cruisers Aso, and Tokiwa. A replacement was budgeted under the Maru-1 Supplementary Naval Expansion Budget of 1931. The new vessel was to be of unprecedented size, thus overcoming the shortcomings of previous minelayers in the Japanese inventory in terms of range and capacity. In addition to carrying 600 Type 6 naval mines, the new ship had the same guns as were used on the Japanese cruiser Yūbari, and also was equipped with an aircraft catapult, and a Kawanishi E7K reconnaissance seaplane.

Okinoshima was launched by the Harima Shipyards (now part of IHI Corporation) in Hyōgo Prefecture, Japan on November 14, 1935, and was commissioned into service on 30 September 1936.

== Operational history ==
During the late 1930s, Okinoshima was assigned as flagship of a destroyer squadron, and made numerous survey missions to the Marshall Islands, Caroline Islands and Marianas in the Japanese South Seas Mandate, seeking potential sites for seaplane bases, and transporting naval mines for future use.

At the time of the attack on Pearl Harbor in December 1941, Okinoshima was serving as flagship for Admiral Kiyohide Shima in Operation Gi (the invasion of the Gilbert Islands) and had deployed from Jaluit with a Special Naval Landing Force (SNLF) embarked. From 9–10 December, Okinoshima supported the Japanese landings on Makin and on Tarawa, and on 24 December, the seizure of Abaiang. Okinoshima was at Truk on 1 January 1942.

In January 1942, under the overall command of Admiral Sadamichi Kajioka, Okinoshima participated in "Operation R" (the invasion of Rabaul) landing Japanese troops at Blanche Bay, Rabaul on the night of 22/23 January 1942. On 1 February, Okinoshima was officially reassigned to the South Seas Force.

On 5 March, Okinoshima, under the overall command of Admiral Kuninori Marumo, was assigned to "Operation SR" (the invasion of Lae and Salamaua in New Guinea). On 10 March, the invasion force was attacked by United States Navy aircraft from USS Yorktown and USS Lexington, with Okinoshima suffering light damage.

After repairs at Truk, on 28 April Okinoshima was appointed flagship for Admiral Shima's Tulagi invasion force, which was part of "Operation Mo" (the invasion of Tulagi and Port Moresby in New Guinea). The Tulagi assault force began their landings on Tulagi on 3 May, with Okinoshima successfully landing troops of the Kure 3rd SNLF. However, the invasion force was attacked on 4 May by aircraft from the USS Yorktown. Several transports and the destroyer Kikuzuki were sunk and Okinoshima suffered from a near miss, which resulted in her being towed to Rabaul for repairs.

== Fate ==
On 10 May, Okinoshima departed Rabaul as part of "Operation RY", the invasion of Nauru and Ocean Island. On 12 May 1942, off New Ireland, she was hit by two or three torpedoes from the American submarine USS S-42. Okinoshima was taken under tow by the escorting destroyer Mochizuki, but capsized in St. George's Channel, in the Bismarck Sea at position 05°06′S 153°48′E. Most of the crew survived. Okinoshima was removed from the navy list on 25 May 1942.
