= USS S-42 =

Submarine of the United States

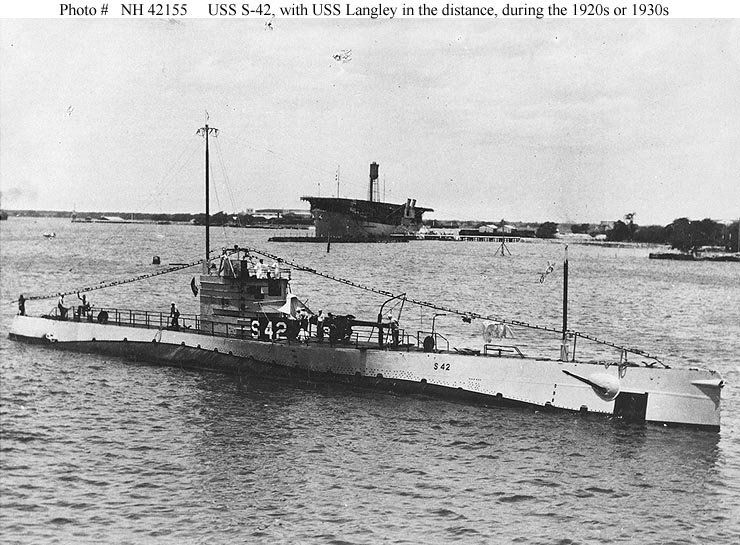
- USS S-42 at San Diego, California, with aircraft carrier USS Langley in the background, sometime between 1924 and 1936.

History

United States
- Name: USS S-42
- Builder: Bethlehem Shipbuilding Corporation, Quincy, Massachusetts
- Laid down: 16 December 1920
- Launched: 30 April 1923
- Sponsored by: Mrs. Henry A. Hutchins, Jr.
- Commissioned: 20 November 1924
- Decommissioned: 25 October 1945
- Stricken: 13 November 1945
- Fate: Sold for scrapping November 1946

General characteristics
- Class & type: S-class submarine
- Displacement: 850 long tons (864 t) surfaced; 1,126 long tons (1,144 t) submerged
- Length: 225 ft 3 in (68.66 m)
- Beam: 20 ft 8 in (6.30 m)
- Draft: 16 ft (4.9 m)
- Speed: 14.5 knots (16.7 mph; 26.9 km/h) surfaced; 11 knots (13 mph; 20 km/h) submerged
- Complement: 42 officers and men
- Armament: 1 × 4 in (102 mm)/50 deck gun; 4 × 21-inch (533 mm) torpedo tubes

Service record
- Operations: World War II
- Awards: 1 battle star

USS S-42 (SS-153) was the first member in the third group of S-class submarines of the United States Navy.

== Construction and commissioning ==
S-42′s keel was laid down on 16 December 1920 by the Bethlehem Shipbuilding Corporation's Fore River Shipyard in Quincy, Massachusetts. She was launched on 30 April 1923, sponsored by Mrs. Henry A. Hutchins, Jr., and commissioned on 20 November 1924, Lieutenant John "Babe" Brown in command.

== Service history ==
Following shakedown off the New England coast, S-42 departed New London, Connecticut, in January 1925 and moved south to Coco Solo, whence she operated, both in the Caribbean Sea and in the Pacific Ocean, until the spring of 1927. Then ordered to Hawaii, she cleared the Gulf of Panama in May, was refitted in California, and arrived at Pearl Harbor on 22 July. The following month, she joined other fleet units in searching for missing Dole Air Race competitors and, later in the year, returned to California. Overhaul followed; and, on 4 February 1928, she rejoined the Battle Force at San Diego, California, where she was based into 1930. In December of that year, S-42’s division was transferred to Pearl Harbor. She then operated in Hawaiian waters and during annual fleet problems, off the Panama Canal Zone and in the Caribbean. From 1932 through 1935, however, she rotated between those active duty operations with Submarine Division 11 and inactive periods with Reserve Submarine Division 14.

In March 1936, S-42 was transferred back to the submarine base at Coco Solo, where she was homeported until ordered to New London in June 1941. From New London, she shifted to Philadelphia, Pennsylvania, and with others of her division, now Submarine Division 53, she underwent modernization overhaul. With more up-to-date equipment — which did not include air conditioning — and somewhat improved performance capabilities, she moved south to Bermuda in November and conducted training and patrol operations there into December. Then, after 7 June, she proceeded back to the Canal Zone.

=== World War II ===
During January 1942, S-42 conducted security patrols in the Pacific approaches to the Canal. In February, she prepared to join Allied forces in the southwest Pacific, and, in early March, she started out across the ocean. On 15 April, she arrived in Moreton Bay, Brisbane, Australia. There, Submarine Division 53 joined the S-boats of the Asiatic Fleet, forming TF 42. These World War I-designed submarines were to "fill the gap," to impede Japanese progress in the Bismarck Archipelago and the Solomon Islands, until larger and better equipped fleet submarines could be sent to the area.

Ten days after her arrival, S-42 (in the hands of Oliver G. Kirk, Annapolis Class of 1929) cleared Moreton Bay and headed north across the Coral Sea for her first war patrol. After reaching 15 degrees south, she ran submerged during the day and surfaced at night to recharge her batteries and allow a brief respite from the high temperatures and humidity of submerged running. On the afternoon of 3 May, she entered her assigned patrol area, and, that evening, she closed the coast of New Ireland. Two days later, she sighted, fired on, and missed a medium-sized tender off Cape St. George. On 6 May, she shifted eastward to patrol between Buka and the cape. On 11 May, off New Britain, she sighted the minelayer Okinoshima (damaged at the Battle of the Coral Sea) through driving rain. S-42 fired four torpedoes, scored with three; and sent the 4400-ton minelayer to the bottom.

The action, begun at 04:39, was over by 04:52. By 05:15, enemy destroyers were closing S-42’s position. Within five minutes, they began dropping depth charges. At 11:30, the last depth charge attack took place. At 14:30, the last sound contact was made with the still searching enemy. Sea water leaked into the control room in increasing amounts, but S-42 remained submerged for another four hours. She then surfaced to repair some of the damage and recharge her batteries. When she submerged, she was unable to control her depth. She surfaced for further temporary repairs. At dawn, she dived successfully.

Leaks in the control room, however, continued, and she headed home. That day, 12 May, she attempted to send a message to ComSubRon 5. Two days later, she was still attempting to raise Brisbane, sending her message via Port Moresby, Townsville, Queensland, and Honolulu, Hawaii. On 16 May, her port engine flooded, but was put back into commission, temporarily. On 17 May, she raised Dutch Harbor, whence her dispatches were relayed to Brisbane. Three days later, she arrived in Moreton Bay.

On 3 July, S-42 departed Brisbane for her second patrol. On 12 July, prior to taking up her offensive role in St. George's Channel, she landed an agent at Adler Bay, near Rabaul. His first report, soon dispatched, warned her to avoid native canoes as the Japanese were paying well for information. Weather, however, proved to be the worst impediment, encountered as frequent rains and heavy seas hindered her hunting.

On the night of 19 July, S-42 returned to Adler Bay; reembarked the Australian intelligence officer, then got underway for Brisbane, where she arrived on 28 July.

During the first week in August, the Allied offensive began with the landings on Guadalcanal. Two weeks later, on 21 August, S-42 (now commanded by Harley K. Nauman, Class of 1934) headed for the Solomons to support the offensive by patrolling in the already bloodied and iron-filled waters of the Savo Island–Cape Esperance area.

On 23 August, an engine room hatch, improperly latched, began to leak — 15 gallons per hour at 90 feet. Wooden wedges were driven into the coaming, reducing the flow to a drip. S-42 continued on to the Solomons. She arrived on station five days later and remained into September; but — without modern electronics, quick maneuverability, and speed — she was unable to close the night convoys from Rabaul.

Upkeep at Brisbane occupied the period between 19 September and 19 October. On 20 October, she headed for the Solomons to intercept traffic on the Rabaul-Faisi-Buin line, as well as lay mines. Assigned to Bougainville Strait, she again made many contacts, but was unable to score. On 2 November, she fired four torpedoes at a destroyer steaming in company with three others. An explosion was heard, but depth charge attacks precluded determining the results.

On 5 November, she departed the area and made for the Fiji Islands. On 16 November, she moored in Suva harbor, where she was joined by others of her division and, on 1 December, she got underway to return to the United States.

Transiting the Panama Canal in early January 1943, she proceeded to Cuba in February; provided antisubmarine warfare training services for newly commissioned destroyers through March, then continued on to Philadelphia, where she underwent overhaul and acquired air conditioning and radar. In late June, she departed Hampton Roads for San Diego, whence she sailed for the Aleutian Islands in mid-August. On 2 September, she departed Dutch Harbor for the Kuril Islands and her only North Pacific war patrol.

Stopping en route at Attu, the forty-day patrol was spent primarily in the Paramushiro-Onekotan area, and contributed no sinkings or damage. She returned to Dutch Harbor on 12 October. On 23 November, she departed again. En route to her assigned area, her port engine seized, and her patrol was cancelled. On 27 November, she put into Massacre Bay, Attu, where she remained for repairs into January 1944. In February, she returned to Dutch Harbor thence proceeded to Pearl Harbor and another tour in the southwest Pacific.

S-42 arrived at Milne Bay, New Guinea, on 19 March. There, through May, she provided target services to ships conducting antisubmarine warfare exercises. In June, she shifted to Seeadler Harbor in the Admiralty Islands; provided similar services until 1 August; then prepared for her last war patrol. Five days later, she got underway for Halmahera with a four-man Australian intelligence team embarked. On 15, 21, and 22 August, members of the team were landed, singly, at designated points. These men were to contact and pick up other agents previously landed. On 26 August, the scout landed at Gorango Bay was recovered alone. He had been unable to contact his assigned agent. The other scouts were not recovered. On 3 September, S-42 returned to Seeadler Harbor.

Resuming ASW training duties, S-42 remained in the Admiralties into October. At mid-month, she arrived at Brisbane for overhaul; and, in January 1945, she returned to the Admiralties. In mid-February, she departed Manus for California, arriving at San Diego at the end of March. There, she provided training services for the West Coast Sound School through the end of World War II. In September, she shifted to San Francisco, California, where she was decommissioned on 25 October 1945. Stricken from the Naval Vessel Register on 13 November, she was sold for scrapping in November 1946.

== Awards ==
- American Defense Service Medal
- American Campaign Medal
- Asiatic-Pacific Campaign Medal with one battle star
- World War II Victory Medal
