= Operation Mo =

1942 Japanese planned military offensive against the Australian territory of New Guinea

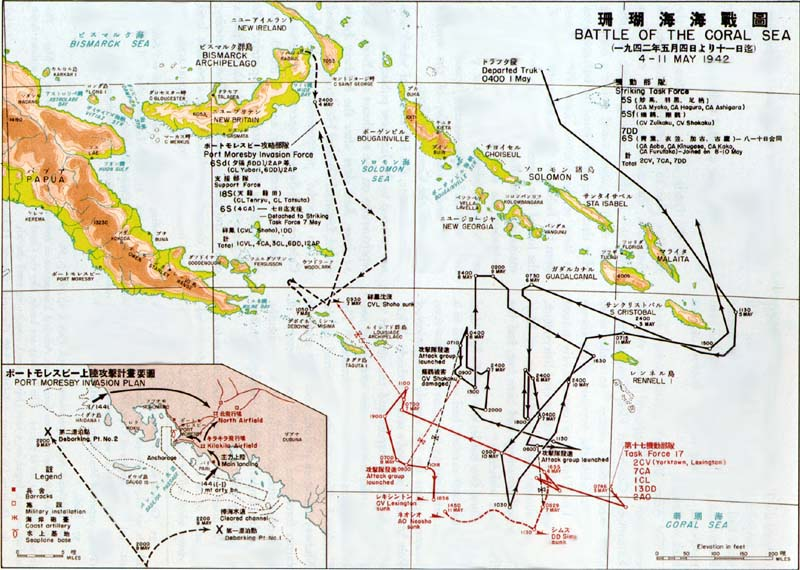
- Planned: April 1942
- Objective: Occupation of Port Moresby
- Outcome: Abandoned following the Battle of the Coral Sea

Operation Mo (MO作戦, Mo Sakusen) or the Port Moresby Operation was a Japanese plan to take control of the Australian Territory of New Guinea during World War II as well as other locations in the South Pacific. The goal was to isolate Australia and New Zealand from the United States in the Allies.

The plan was developed by the Imperial Japanese Navy and supported by Admiral Isoroku Yamamoto, the commander-in-chief of the Combined Fleet, but the operation was eventually abandoned following the Battle of the Coral Sea.

== Background ==
When the Imperial Japanese Navy was planning the New Guinea Campaign (air strikes against Lae and Salamaua, disembarkation in Huon Gulf, New Britain (now Rabaul), New Ireland (now Kavieng), Finch Harbor (also called Finschhafen), and the capture of Morobe and Buna), strategists envisioned those territories as support points to implement the capture of Port Moresby. The implementation of those operations was assigned to the Japanese Naval task force led by Admiral Chūichi Nagumo, after completing the Java campaign. Another important step was the occupation of Christmas Island, south of Java. The Japanese Navy General Staff had been considering Operation Mo since 1938, as a step in the consolidation of the South Seas areas in the Greater East Asia Co-Prosperity Sphere (大東亜共栄圏, Dai-tō-a Kyōeiken).

== Strategy ==
The directive of Operation Mo was conceived in 1938 but with no specific time for its execution, pending earlier successes in the southern area during the first and the second phases of the conquest.

In April 1942, the operation was organized into four large actions and was approved by the Army and Navy General Staffs:

- On 3 May, the Light Task Force occupied the port of Tulagi, near Guadalcanal, in the Solomon Islands, to establish a seaplane base and a base for operations in the Coral Sea area. The same force was to take Nauru and Ocean Island (now Banaba) for their valuable phosphate deposits.
- The South Seas Detachment was to disembark in Port Moresby on 10 May, with another force occupying territory in the Louisiade Archipelago for another seaplane base.
- Another objective of the South Sea Detachment was Operation FS, the assault on New Caledonia, Fiji, and Samoa. Imperial General Headquarters assigned a new double objective: capture and secure Port Moresby, in cooperation with the Navy; and seize strategic points of opportunity in eastern New Guinea.
- Another important Naval force, departing from Truk, was to pass the Eastern Solomons area to the south and finally advance toward the west to intercept the enemy. Then, strikes were planned on the coastal cities of Coen, Cooktown, and Townsville, in Queensland, which were terminal points in the supply line between the United States and Australia. The final object was Thursday Island, north of Cape York.
- The Japanese had one Navy Air Service land-based fleet detached in Rabaul, Lae, Salamaua, and Buna. The air fleet executed the air strikes against Port Moresby on 5 May and 6 May, in preparation for the Japanese landing on 7 May.

Japanese planners took into account an Allied response to the operation by detaching one task force to the west of parallel between of Rennel and Deboyne Islands and another to the east of same point. Those measures would permit a Japanese invasion force to use the Jomard Passage directly to Port Moresby. Japanese naval intelligence also then suspected the presence of the American aircraft carrier USS Yorktown in the Coral Sea waters.

A Japanese message on 9 April 1942 indicated that the "RZP Campaign" against Port Moresby was to be an invasion, not an air raid, and would isolate Australia from America. US Navy codebreaker Rudy Fabian at FRUMEL briefed Douglas MacArthur, who was "incredulous" and expected the target to be New Caledonia. That made Fabian explain the JN-25 codebreaking process and show MacArthur the Japanese commander’s intercepted message. Its objectives were to restrict enemy fleet movements and to attack the north coast of Australia.

A transport that was due to leave the next day for New Caledonia was sent instead to Port Moresby. On 23 April, Fabian showed MacArthur that the Imperial Japanese Navy was amassing a large force at Truk and planned to occupy also Tulagi. MacArthur got an Australian reconnaissance plane to "discover" the Port Moresby invasion force on 5 May, which led to the Battle of the Coral Sea (see Central Bureau).

== Order of battle ==
The Tulagi assault force, led by Rear Admiral Kiyohide Shima, was composed of the following units:

- Minelayer-cruiser Okinoshima
- Seaplane tender Kiyokawa Maru
- Destroyers Kikuzuki, Minazuki, Mochizuki and Yūzuki
- two transports
- smaller support vessels

The Port Moresby occupation force, led by Rear Admiral Sadamichi Kajioka, was composed of the following units:

- Light cruiser Yūbari
- Destroyers Mutsuki, Yayoi, Uzuki, Asanagi, Oite and Yūnagi
- Minelayers and sea patrol vessels
- Seaplane tender Kamikawa Maru
- Minelayer Tsugaru

Supporting those operations and intercepting any Allied interference, Rear Admiral Aritomo Goto commanded:

- Light carrier Shōhō
- Heavy cruisers Aoba, Kinugasa, Kako and Furutaka
- Light cruisers Tenryū, Tatsuta
- Destroyer Sazanami

During the course of the operation, Yamamoto sent the following heavy support force from Truk, led by Rear Admiral Chuichi Hara:

- Fleet carriers Shōkaku and Zuikaku
- Heavy cruisers Myōkō and Haguro
- Destroyers Asashio, Arashio, Arare, Kagerō, Shiranui and Kasumi
- Auxiliary vessels

Supporting the force was the 25th Air Fleet (Yokohama Air Corps), led by Rear Admiral Sadayoshi Yamada, based in Rabaul, Lae, Salamaua, Buna, and Deboyne Islands, composed of 60 Mitsubishi A6M "Zero" fighters, 48 Mitsubishi G3M "Nell" and 26 Aichi E13A "Jake" and Mitsubishi F1M "Pete" reconnaissance seaplanes. The unit bombed Port Moresby on 5–6 May, ahead of the Japanese Army-Navy landings on 7 May.

== Execution ==
The Tulagi assault force began its landings on Tulagi on 3 May. On 4 May 1942, troopships bearing the South Seas Detachment set sail southward from Rabaul for Port Moresby. This same day, US aircraft from USS Yorktown attacked the Tulagi assault force and inflicted heavy damage but failed to prevent the occupation of Tulagi, Gavutu, and Tanambogo Islands.

Three days later, as a naval engagement appeared to be brewing in the Coral Sea, the Japanese transports to Port Moresby immediately veered back to the north to avoid combat. The resulting Battle of the Coral Sea inflicted significant aircraft losses on the Fourth Fleet, Shōhō was sunk, and Shōkaku was damaged. Air groups from the two carriers, including the relatively undamaged Zuikaku, suffered such sizable losses that they had to return to Japan to re*equip and train.

The Japanese abandoned their plans to land the South Seas Detachment directly at Port Moresby from the sea. The Imperial Japanese Army was making new preparations for combat, but on 11 July, the Japanese High Command ordered the suspension of Operation FS the projected actions against New Caledonia, Fiji, and Samoa, after the remaining Japanese carrier strength had been destroyed at the Battle of Midway.

Those battles prevented the Japanese landings against Port Moresby. Instead, the Imperial Japanese Army commenced an ultimately unsuccessful campaign to take Port Moresby with an overland approach across the Owen Stanley Range via the Kokoda Track.
