= Japanese destroyer Yūzuki =

Destroyer of the Imperial Japanese Navy

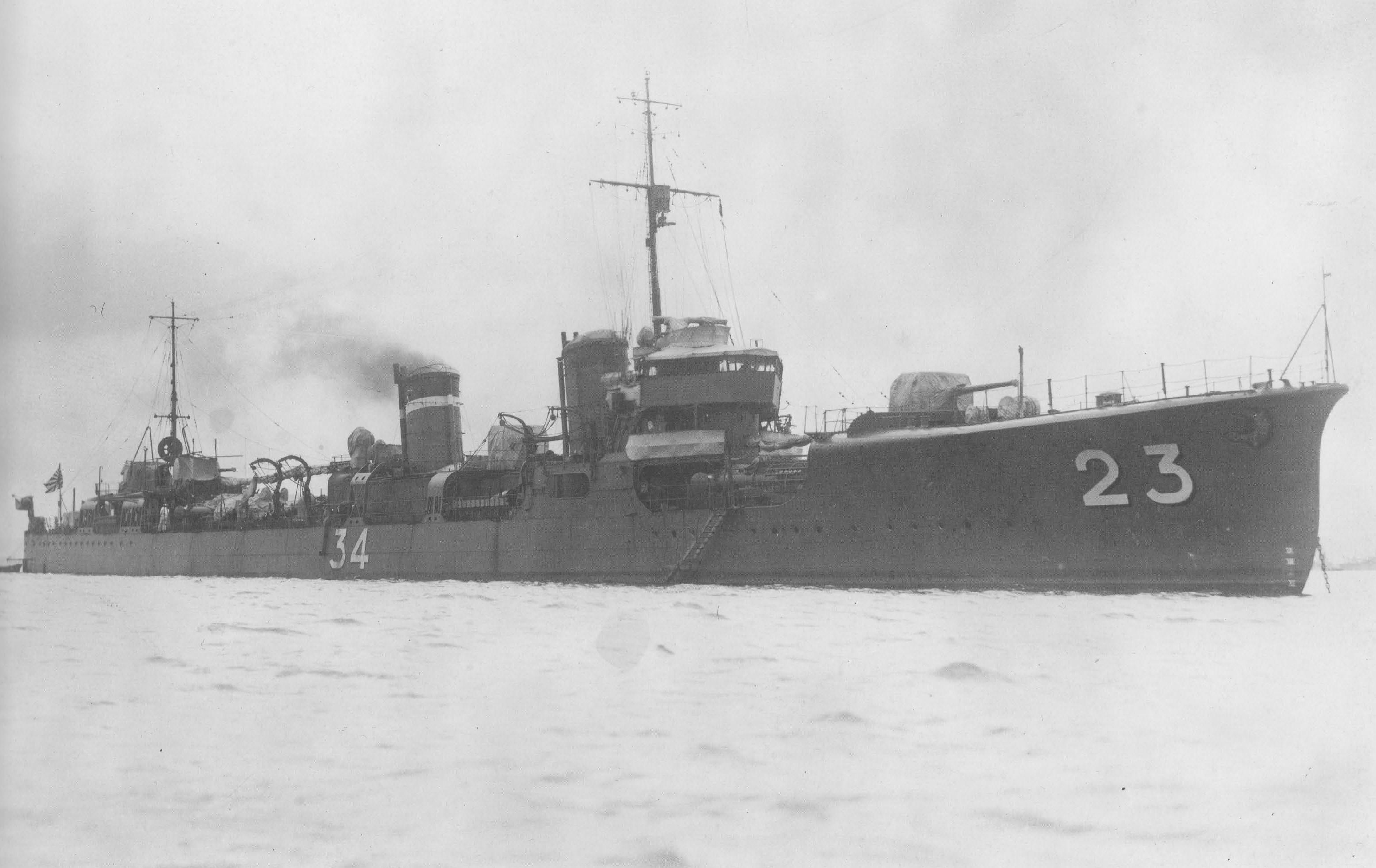
- Yūzuki on 5 July 1928

History

Empire of Japan
- Name: Yūzuki
- Builder: Fujinagata Shipyards, Osaka
- Laid down: 27 November 1926 as Destroyer No. 34
- Launched: 4 March 1927
- Completed: 25 July 1927
- Renamed: As Yūzuki, 1 August 1928
- Stricken: 20 January 1945
- Fate: Sunk by American aircraft, 12 December 1944

General characteristics
- Class & type: Mutsuki-class destroyer
- Displacement: 1,336 t (1,315 long tons) (normal); 1,800 t (1,772 long tons) (deep load)
- Length: 97.54 m (320 ft 0 in) (pp); 102.4 m (335 ft 11 in) (o/a)
- Beam: 9.16 m (30 ft 1 in)
- Draft: 2.96 m (9 ft 9 in)
- Installed power: 38,500 shp (28,700 kW); 4 × Kampon water-tube boilers
- Propulsion: 2 shafts; 2 × Kampon geared steam turbines
- Speed: 37.25 knots (68.99 km/h; 42.87 mph)
- Range: 4,000 nmi (7,400 km; 4,600 mi) at 15 knots (28 km/h; 17 mph)
- Complement: 150
- Armament: 4 × 12 cm (4.7 in) Type 3 guns; 2 × triple 61 cm (24 in) torpedo tubes; 18 × depth charges; 16 × mines

Service record
- Part of: Destroyer Division 23
- Operations: Second Sino-Japanese War; Invasion of Guam; Solomon Islands campaign; Battle of the Philippine Sea

The Japanese destroyer Yūzuki (夕月, "Evening Moon") was the last of twelve Mutsuki-class destroyers built for the Imperial Japanese Navy (IJN) during the 1920s. During the Pacific War, she participated in the Battle of Guam in December 1941 and the occupations of New Guinea and the Solomon Islands in early 1942.

== Design and description ==
The Mutsuki class was an improved version of the Kamikaze-class destroyers and was the first with triple 61-centimeter (24 in) torpedo tubes. The ships had an overall length of 102.4 meters (335 ft 11 in) and were 94.54 meters (310 ft 2 in) between perpendiculars. They had a beam of 9.16 meters (30 ft 1 in), and a mean draft of 2.96 meters (9 ft 9 in). The Mutsuki-class ships displaced 1,336 metric tons (1,315 long tons) at standard load and 1,800 metric tons (1,772 long tons) at deep load. They were powered by two Parsons geared steam turbines, each driving one propeller shaft, using steam provided by four Kampon water-tube boilers. The turbines were designed to produce 38,500 shaft horsepower (28,700 kW), which would propel the ships at 37.25 knots (68.99 km/h; 42.87 mph). The ships carried 420 metric tons (413 long tons) of fuel oil which gave them a range of 4,000 nautical miles (7,400 km; 4,600 mi) at 15 knots (28 km/h; 17 mph). Their crew consisted of 150 officers and crewmen.

The main armament of the Mutsuki-class ships consisted of four 12-centimeter (4.7 in) Type 3 guns in single mounts; one gun forward of the superstructure, one between the two funnels and the last pair back to back atop the aft superstructure. The guns were numbered '1' to '4' from front to rear. The ships carried two above-water triple sets of 61-centimeter torpedo tubes; one mount was between the forward superstructure and the forward gun and the other was between the aft funnel and aft superstructure. Four reload torpedoes were provided for the tubes. They carried 18 depth charges and could also carry 16 mines. They could also fitted with minesweeping gear.

During Yūzuki's December 1943–January 1944 refit, Nos. 2 and 4 guns were removed in exchange for additional license-built 25 mm (1.0 in) Type 96 light AA guns and at least two 13.2 mm (0.5 in) Type 93 anti-aircraft machineguns were installed abreast the bridge. In May–June, at Type 13 radar was installed, four 13.2 mm guns were removed and six more 25 mm guns were added.

== Construction and career ==
Yūzuki, built at the Fujinagata Shipyards in Osaka, was laid down on 27 November 1926, launched on 4 March 1927 and completed on 25 July 1927. Originally commissioned simply as Destroyer No. 34, the ship was assigned the name Yūzuki on 1 August 1928. In the late 1930s, she participated in combat during the Second Sino-Japanese War, covering the landings of Japanese troops in central and southern China, and the Invasion of French Indochina.

=== Pacific War ===
At the time of the attack on Pearl Harbor, Yūzuki was assigned to Destroyer Division 23 under the Second Carrier Division of the 1st Air Fleet. She sortied from Hahajima in the Ogasawara Islands as part of the Japanese invasion force for the invasion of Guam. She returned to Truk in early January 1942 to join the invasion force for Operation R covering landings of Japanese forces at Kavieng, New Ireland on 23 January, and returning to Truk one month later. In March, Yūzuki assisted in covering landings of Japanese forces in the northern Solomon Islands, Lae and Admiralty Islands. The ship was reassigned to the 4th Fleet on 10 April.

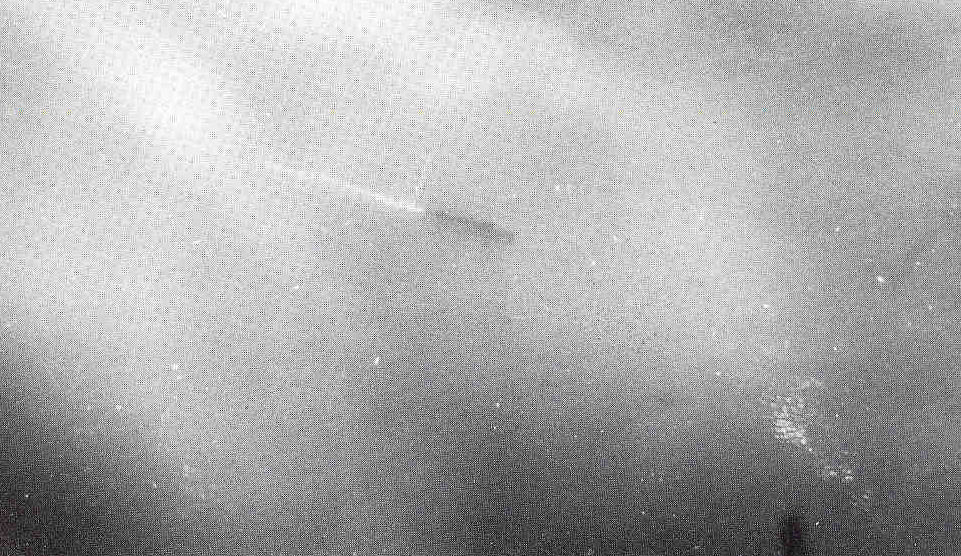
Yūzuki flees Tulagi harbor during airstrikes by aircraft from the aircraft carrier USS Yorktown on 4 May 1942 during the Japanese invasion of Tulagi

During the invasion of Tulagi on 3–4 May 1942, Yūzuki was strafed in an air attack, which killed 10 crewmen, including her captain, Lieutenant Commander Hirota Tachibana, and injured 20 more. After the sinking of her sister ship Kikuzuki, she became the flagship of Destroyer Division 30.

After repairs at Sasebo Naval Arsenal later that month, Yūzuki was assigned to Destroyer Division 29 in June and remained flagship of the division. The ship was initially based at Truk, and assigned to escort convoys carrying airfield construction crews from Truk to Bougainville and Guadalcanal, and patrols around Rabaul until the end of August. On 31 August, Yūzuki helped screen the Nauru and Ocean Island invasion force during Operation RY, and patrolled in the central Pacific to the end of the year.

After maintenance at Sasebo in January 1943, Yūzuki returned to Truk in February and resumed her patrols in the central Pacific to November 1943, on numerous occasions rescuing crews of torpedoed transports. On 30 November, Yuzuki was reassigned to Destroyer Division 30 of Destroyer Squadron 3, of the 8th Fleet and returned to Rabaul on 17 February 1944. In February, Yūzuki led the final Tokyo Express transport runs to New Britain and the final evacuation of Rabaul. From the end of February to May, Yūzuki was based at Palau and assisted in rescuing the survivors of the torpedoed light cruiser Yūbari on 27 April. From 1 May, Yūzuki was reassigned to the Central Pacific Area Fleet and on 18 July, directly to the Combined Fleet. In September and October, Yūzuki escorted convoys from the Japanese home islands to Taiwan, and escorted the aircraft carrier Jun'yō to Brunei and Manila. On 21 November, Yūzuki was reassigned to the 5th Fleet.

On 12 December, while escorting a troop convoy from Manila to Ormoc, Yūzuki was sunk by USMC aircraft, 65 miles (105 km) north-northeast of Cebu at coordinates 11°20′N 124°10′E, with 20 crewmen killed and 217 survivors. The survivors were rescued by the destroyer Kiri. Yūzuki was struck from the Navy List on 10 January 1945.
