= Azumasan Maru (1933) =

History
- Name: Azumasan Maru
- Owner: Mitsui Bussan Kaisha (1933–??); Imperial Japanese Navy (1941-1942)
- Builder: Mitsui Bussan Kaisha, Tama
- Fate: Sunk by Allied aircraft 1942

General characteristics
- Tonnage: 7,623 GRT
- Length: 454 ft (138 m)
- Beam: 60 ft (18 m)
- Draught: 37 ft (11 m)

Azumasan Maru was a 7,623-gross register ton freighter that was built by Mitsui Bussan Kaisha, Tama for Mitsui Bussan Kaisha and launched in 1933. She was requisitioned by the Imperial Japanese Navy and fitted out as a troop transport.

She was part of the invasion fleet that landed troops during the invasion of Tulagi on 3 May 1942. She was anchored at Purvis Bay, Florida Island when the Tulagi invasion fleet was attacked by aircraft of the United States Navy's aircraft carrier USS Yorktown, with Azumasan Maru being damaged in the attack.

Azumasan Maru left Rabaul in a convoy to resupply Guadalcanal. Disembarkation began near Tassafaronga Point on 15 October. The ships of the convoy came under bombardment from Douglas SBD Dauntless dive bombers and even a torpedo attack by a Consolidated PBY Catalina aircraft from Henderson Field. The ship was beached to prevent sinking after suffering severe damage. On 16 October, B-17 aircraft further damaged the ship, with the result that at night she slipped off the reef and sank.

== Wreck ==
The wreck of Azumasan Maru stands upright at a depth of 39 metres (128 ft) on the deck at the bow, over 80 metres (260 ft) at the shattered stern, and 62 metres (203 ft) at the bridge. Kawasaki motorcycles and sidecars can be found in her holds. Located at approximately 9°22′S 159°51.6′E, near the mouth of Ruinin Creek, the wreck is known by some as "Deep Ruinin Wreck".

== See also ==
- Foreign commerce and shipping of Empire of Japan
