= Invasion of Tulagi (May 1942) =

Battle during World War II

- Part of the Pacific Theater of World War II
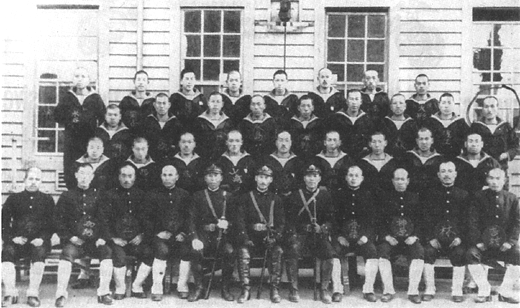
- Headquarters of the Kure 3rd Special Naval Landing Force 3rd Company which participated in the capture of Tulagi in May 1942. Special Duty Lt.(jg) Kakichi Yoshimoto—who was subsequently made commander of the Tulagi Garrison—is seated in the center of the front row.
Date	3–4 May 1942
Location	Tulagi and Gavutu Islands, Solomon Islands
Result	Japanese victory
Territorial changes	Japanese forces occupy Tulagi and nearby islands

Belligerents
Allied forces including: United States; Australia; United Kingdom	Japan

Commanders and leaders
(United Kingdom) William Sydney Marchant (land) (United States) Frank Jack Fletcher (naval)	(Empire of Japan) Isoroku Yamamoto (Empire of Japan) Shigeyoshi Inoue (Empire of Japan) Aritomo Goto (Empire of Japan) Kiyohide Shima

Strength
1 aircraft carrier, 3 cruisers, 4 destroyers, 58 aircraft	2 destroyers, 5 minesweepers, 2 minelayers, 1 transport ship, 2 subchasers, 6 aircraft, 400–500 troops

Casualties and losses
4 aircraft destroyed	1 destroyer, 3 minesweepers sunk, 2 minelayers, 1 destroyer damaged, 1 transport damaged, 5–6 aircraft destroyed, 87 killed

The invasion of Tulagi, on 3–4 May 1942, was part of Operation Mo, the Empire of Japan's strategy in the South Pacific and South West Pacific Area in 1942. The plan called for Imperial Japanese Navy troops to capture Tulagi and nearby islands in the British Solomon Islands Protectorate. The occupation of Tulagi by the Japanese was intended to cover the flank of and provide reconnaissance support for Japanese forces that were advancing on Port Moresby in New Guinea, provide greater defensive depth for the major Japanese base at Rabaul, and serve as a base for Japanese forces to threaten and interdict the supply and communication routes between the United States and Australia and New Zealand.

Without the means to effectively resist the Japanese offensive in the Solomons, the British Resident Commissioner of the Solomon Islands protectorate and the few Australian troops assigned to defend Tulagi evacuated the island just before the Japanese forces arrived on 3 May. The next day, however, a U.S. aircraft carrier task force en route to resist the Japanese forces advancing on Port Moresby (later taking part in the Battle of the Coral Sea) struck the Japanese Tulagi landing force in an air attack, destroying or damaging several of the Japanese ships and aircraft involved in the landing operation. Nevertheless, the Japanese troops successfully occupied Tulagi and began the construction of a small naval base.

Over the next several months, the Japanese established a naval refueling, communications, and seaplane reconnaissance base on Tulagi and the nearby islets of Gavutu and Tanambogo, and in July 1942 began to build a large airfield on nearby Guadalcanal. The Japanese activities on Tulagi and Guadalcanal were observed by Allied reconnaissance aircraft, as well as by Australian coastwatcher personnel stationed in the area. Because these activities threatened the Allied supply and communication lines in the South Pacific, Allied forces counter-attacked with landings of their own on Guadalcanal and Tulagi on 7 August 1942, initiating the critical Guadalcanal campaign and a series of combined arms battles between Allied and Japanese forces that, along with the New Guinea campaign, decided the course of the war in the South Pacific.

== Background ==
On 7 December 1941, the Japanese attacked the U.S. Pacific Fleet at Naval Station Pearl Harbor, Hawaii. The attack crippled most of the U.S. Pacific Fleet's battleships and started a formal state of war between the two nations. In launching this war, Japanese leaders sought to neutralize the American fleet, seize possessions rich in natural resources, and obtain strategic military bases to defend their far-flung empire. Soon after, other nations—including the United Kingdom, Australia, and New Zealand—joined the U.S. as Allies in the war against Japan. In the words of the Japanese Navy's Combined Fleet "Secret Order Number One", dated 1 November 1941, the goals of the initial Japanese campaigns in the impending war were to, "(eject) British and American strength from the Netherlands Indies and the Philippines, (and) to establish a policy of autonomous self-sufficiency and economic independence". To support these goals, during the first few months of 1942 Japanese forces also attacked and took control of the Philippines, Thailand, Malaya, Singapore, the Netherlands East Indies, Wake Island, New Britain, the Gilbert Islands, and Guam.

Vice Admiral Shigeyoshi Inoue—commander of the Japanese 4th Fleet (also called the "South Seas Force") consisting of most of the naval units in the South Pacific area—advocated the seizing of Lae, Salamaua, and Port Moresby in New Guinea and Tulagi in the Solomon Islands. Inoue believed that the capture and control of these locations would provide greater security for the major Japanese base at Rabaul on New Britain. Japan's Naval General Staff endorsed Inoue's argument and began planning further operations, using these locations as supporting bases, to seize Nauru, Ocean Island, New Caledonia, Fiji, and Samoa and thereby cut the supply lines between Australia and the U.S., with the goal of reducing or eliminating Australia as a threat to Japanese positions in the South Pacific.

The Imperial Japanese Army supported the idea of taking Port Moresby and in April 1942, with the Japanese Navy, developed a plan for the attack that was titled "Operation Mo". The plan also included the seizure of Tulagi, a small island in the southern Solomon Islands, where a seaplane base would be set up for potential air operations against Allied territories and forces in the South Pacific. Although Japanese Admiral Isoroku Yamamoto—commander of the Combined Fleet—was concurrently planning an operation that he hoped would lure the U.S. Pacific Fleet into a decisive showdown in the central Pacific, he detached some of his large warships to support the Mo operation and placed Inoue in charge of the naval portion of the operation.

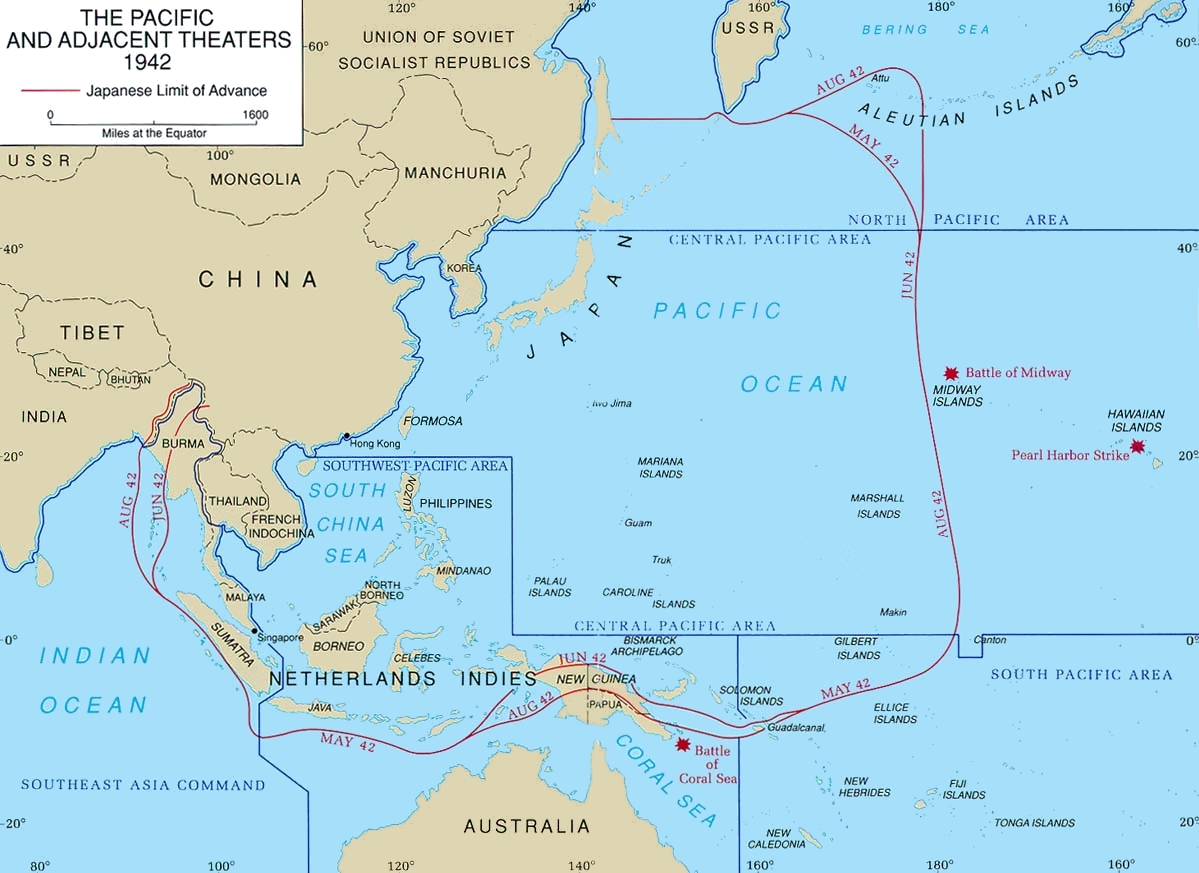
The Pacific Ocean area in 1942. The red line illustrates the territory included, at that time, in the Empire of Japan. Guadalcanal and Tulagi are at the lower center of the map.

A large force consisting of two heavy aircraft carriers, one light aircraft carrier, a seaplane carrier, nine cruisers, and 13 destroyers—split into several elements—was to guard the Japanese Port Moresby invasion convoy as well as to engage any Allied naval warships that approached to contest the invasion. The Tulagi invasion force, consisting of the destroyers Kikuzuki and Yūzuki; minelayer/transports Okinoshima, and Kōei Maru; auxiliary minesweepers Wa-1, Wa-2, Hagoromo Maru, Noshiro Maru #2, and Tama Maru; transport, Azumasan Maru; subchasers Toshi Maru #3 and Tama Maru #8; and commanded by Rear Admiral Kiyohide Shima (flag on Okinoshima), departed from Rabaul on 30 April and headed towards the Solomon Islands. Rear Admiral Aritomo Gotō provided air cover for the Tulagi invasion with his Covering Group of one light carrier (Shōhō), four cruisers, and one destroyer located just west of the central Solomons. A separate Cover Force (sometimes referred to as the Tulagi Support Group)—commanded by Rear Admiral Kuninori Marumo and consisting of two light cruisers, the seaplane tender Kamikawa Maru, and three gunboats—joined the Covering Group in supporting the Tulagi invasion. Once Tulagi was secured on 3 or 4 May, the Covering Group and Cover Force were to reposition to help cover the Port Moresby invasion.

At the time, Tulagi was the capital of the British Solomon Islands Protectorate, which included all of the islands of the Solomons except Bougainville and Buka. William Sydney Marchant, the British Resident Commissioner of the Solomons and commander of the local defense forces, directed the evacuation of most of the white civilian residents to Australia in February 1942. Marchant was evacuated to Malaita the following month, where he helped operate a coastwatcher relay station.

The only Allied military forces at Tulagi were 24 commandos from the Australian Army's 2/1st Independent Company, under Captain A. L. Goode, and about 25 personnel from 11 Squadron RAAF, under F/O R. B. Peagam, operating a seaplane base on nearby Gavutu-Tanambogo with four PBY Catalina maritime patrol aircraft. Three Allied coastwatchers were also located nearby, on Guadalcanal island. The task of the coastwatchers was to report on any enemy movements, or suspicious activity, that they observed in the vicinity of their stations. In the belief that it might prevent them being executed for espionage, all of the coastwatchers were commissioned as Royal Australian Naval Volunteer Reserve officers, and they were directed by Lieutenant Commander Eric Feldt, who was located at Townsville in Australia.

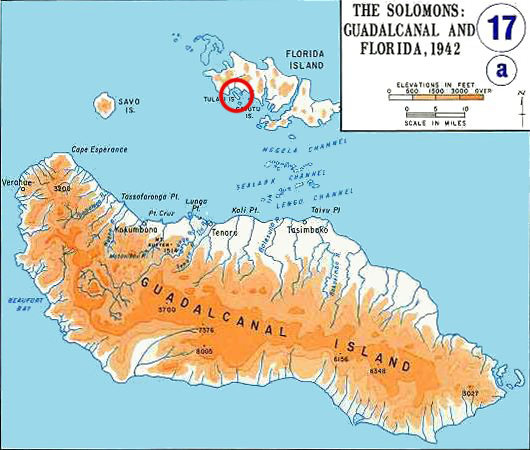
Map of Guadalcanal and Tulagi (circle) as the area appeared in 1942

Throughout most of April, the Japanese conducted "desultory" bombing raids on Tulagi with aircraft based at Rabaul or nearby that caused little, if any, damage. The coastwatchers on Guadalcanal were usually able to radio advance warning to the Australian troops on Tulagi of the approaching Japanese aircraft, but the troops did not have large enough weaponry—three Vickers machine guns and one Bren light machine gun—to seriously challenge the Japanese bombers. On 25 April, Tulagi was bombed by eight Japanese aircraft. Similar raids occurred daily over the next week, with one raid on 1 May heavily damaging one of the Catalinas at Gavutu. The remaining Catalinas successfully evacuated that same day.

Allied intelligence personnel had deciphered much of the Japanese Mo plans through radio intercepts at the Allied Fleet Radio Units (radio intelligence centers) in Melbourne, Australia and Pearl Harbor, Hawaii. Based on this intelligence, on 22 April, U.S. Admiral Chester Nimitz—stationed at Pearl Harbor—directed Allied forces towards the Coral Sea area to interdict the Japanese Mo operation. On 27 April, the U.S. aircraft carrier USS Yorktown's Task Force 17 (TF 17), under the command of Rear Admiral Frank Jack Fletcher, sortied from Tonga and was joined by the U.S. carrier USS Lexington's TF 11 300 nmi (350 mi; 560 km) northwest of New Caledonia on 1 May. That same day, Fletcher detached TF 11 to refuel, expecting to rejoin with Lexington and her escorts on 4 May at a predetermined location in the Coral Sea.

== Landings and air attacks ==
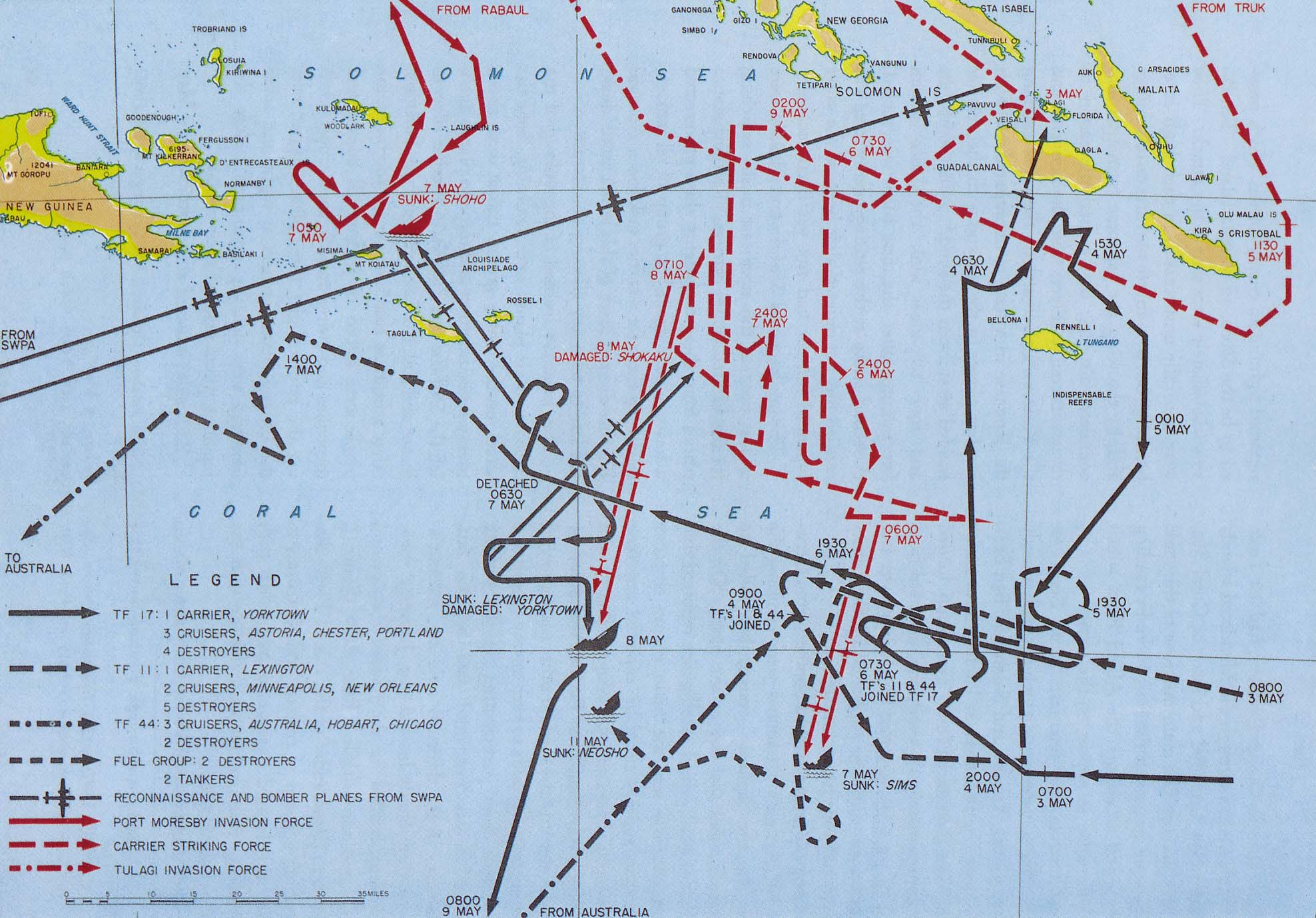
Map of the Battle of the Coral Sea, 3–9 May 1942. The actions involving the Japanese landings and Yorktown's airstrikes at Tulagi are in the upper right of the map.

On 2 May, coastwatcher Jack Read on Bougainville reported that a large force of Japanese ships, believed to be part of the Japanese Tulagi invasion force, had departed from the Buka area. Later that day, coastwatcher D. G. Kennedy on New Georgia island sighted and reported a large Japanese force of ships heading towards the southern Solomons. Soon after, Goode and Peagam—anticipating that the Japanese would attack with overwhelming numbers—ordered the execution of a pre-planned evacuation operation and began the destruction and demolition of their equipment and facilities on Tulagi and Gavutu-Tanambogo. The RAAF personnel and commandos embarked on two small ships early in the morning on 3 May to begin the trip to Vila, New Hebrides, just as Shima's ships entered Savo sound to begin their landings on Tulagi. The ship with the RAAF personnel spent the day with coastwatcher and protectorate District Officer Martin Clemens at Aola on Guadalcanal and departed that night.

Supporting the Japanese landings were seaplanes from Kamikawa Maru, temporarily based at Thousand Ships Bay at Santa Isabel Island. About 400 Japanese naval troops—mainly from the Kure 3rd Special Naval Landing Force—disembarked from the transport ship on barges and immediately began construction of facilities on Tulagi and Gavutu-Tanambogo. Aircraft from Shōhō covered the landings until early afternoon, when Gotō's force turned toward Bougainville to refuel in preparation to support the landings at Port Moresby. Once the Japanese troops were ashore, six seaplanes landed in Tulagi harbor as part of the establishment of the planned seaplane base there.

At 17:00 on 3 May, Fletcher was notified that the Japanese Tulagi invasion force had been sighted the day before approaching the southern Solomons. Unable to communicate with the Lexington task force because of the need to maintain radio silence, Yorktown's task force proceeded independently toward Guadalcanal in order to be in position to launch airstrikes against the Japanese forces at Tulagi the next morning.

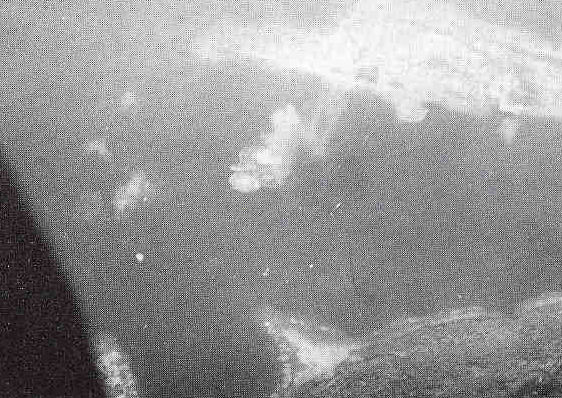
Kōei Maru (center) is straddled by bombs while at anchor in Tulagi harbor during the attacks by Yorktown aircraft.

At 07:01 on 4 May, Yorktown launched a first strike consisting of 12 TBD Devastator torpedo bombers and 28 SBD Dauntless dive bombers from a position about 160 km (86 nmi; 99 mi) south of Guadalcanal. The aircraft began their attacks on Shima's ships anchored near Tulagi at 08:50, taking the Japanese ships by surprise and at anchor. Okinoshima and the two destroyers were positioned to provide a protective barrier for Azumasan Maru and Kōei Maru which were busy unloading troops and materiel. The three minesweepers had just got underway to support the Port Moresby invasion and were still near Tulagi. Although the U.S. pilots from the first strike claimed many bomb and torpedo hits on the anchored ships, they actually hit only Okinoshima, causing minor damage, and Kikuzuki, causing major damage. Kikuzuki—with the assistance of one of the subchasers—was beached on Gavutu in an attempt to keep her from sinking. During this time, all of the other ships weighed anchor and attempted to escape from the harbor. One U.S. dive bomber destroyed a Japanese Mitsubishi F1M2 "Pete" floatplane that attempted to take off during the attack.

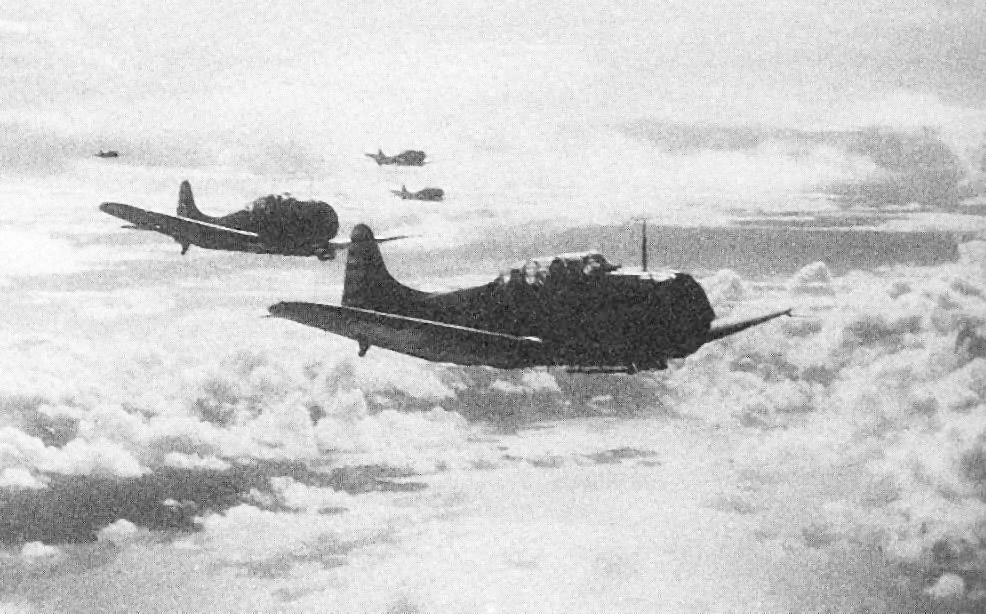
Yorktown SBD-3 dive bombers return to their carrier after striking Japanese shipping in Tulagi harbor.

Yorktown's second strike—utilizing the same aircraft—returned to Tulagi and began their attack at 12:10 on the Japanese ships, many of which were now at full steam and attempting to put distance between themselves and Tulagi harbor. The second strike hit and sank the minesweepers #1 and #2 and severely damaged Tama Maru northeast of Savo Island. Another Japanese seaplane was shot down by a U.S. dive bomber during the second strike. After four F4F-3/3A Wildcat fighters from Yorktown joined the strike, the fighters shot down two more Japanese floatplanes over Florida Island. The four U.S. fighters then strafed Yūzuki, killing her captain and nine others of her crew, and causing moderate damage to the ship. Two or three other Japanese floatplanes were damaged in Tulagi harbor and their crews were killed.

A third, smaller strike from Yorktown arrived at 15:30 and caused moderate damage to Azumasan Maru and Okinoshima. One of the TBDs (Bu No. 0333) in the third strike became lost, ran out of fuel, and ditched in the ocean about 60 km (32 nmi; 37 mi) south of Guadalcanal. Two of the Wildcats from the second strike also ran out of fuel and crash landed on the southern coast of Guadalcanal. Fletcher sent the destroyers USS Hammann and Perkins to rescue the aircrews from the three aircraft. Hammann was able to recover both fighter pilots, but Perkins was unable to locate the TBD's crew. Both destroyers returned to Yorktown's task force late that evening as the task force turned away from Guadalcanal toward the southeast in order to refuel and rendezvous with Lexington the next day.

== Aftermath ==
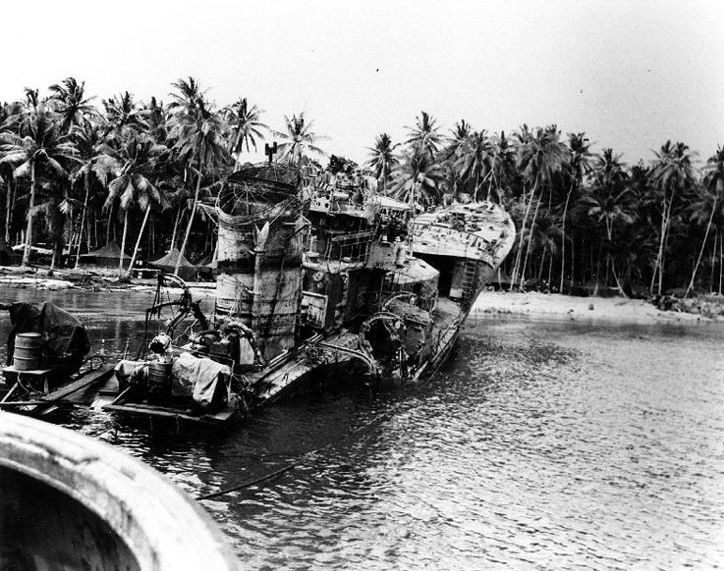
The rusting hulk of Kikuzuki, photographed on Tulagi in August 1943 after U.S. forces dragged the wreckage onto the beach

On 5 May, Kikuzuki slid off of the shore of Gavutu and sank in Tulagi harbor, a total loss (09°07′S 160°12′E). Tama Maru foundered two days later. The other surviving, damaged Japanese ships were able to reach Rabaul and Kavieng for repairs. Hagoromo Maru and Noshiro Maru #2 joined the Port Moresby Invasion Group. On 10 May, as Okinoshima participated in the first Japanese attempt to take Ocean (Banaba) and Nauru Islands, titled Operation RY, she was sunk by the submarine USS S-42 off New Ireland (05°06′S 153°48′E). A total of 87 Japanese naval personnel died in the 4 May air attacks on Tulagi, and 36 of the landing troops were seriously injured.

The lost Yorktown TBD aircrew (Leonard Ewoldt, pilot, and Ray Machalinsk gunner) reached Guadalcanal after drifting in the ocean for three days. A Roman Catholic missionary, Father Jean Boudard, took them to Martin Clemens who arranged for a boat to take them to San Cristobal. From San Cristobal, another boat took them to the New Hebrides and from there they eventually rejoined U.S. forces.

After striking Tulagi, Yorktown rejoined with Lexington, and the two carriers engaged the rest of the Japanese forces involved in the Mo operation from 6–8 May in the Battle of the Coral Sea. In the battle, Lexington was sunk and Yorktown was damaged. The Japanese suffered Shōhō sunk, a fleet carrier heavily damaged, and heavy losses to their carrier aircraft and aircrews. Fearing more damaging attacks from Allied land-based aircraft or warships and unable because of their aircraft losses to provide adequate air cover for their naval surface forces, the Japanese turned back from their planned assault on Port Moresby with the intention of trying again later. The next Japanese seaborne attempt to take Port Moresby, however, never happened, mainly because of their navy's defeat in June at the Battle of Midway. Instead, the Japanese decided to try to take Port Moresby in an ultimately unsuccessful overland attack along the Kokoda Track. The failure to take Port Moresby in May 1942 would have significant and far-reaching strategic implications, many of which involved the small Japanese naval base at Tulagi.

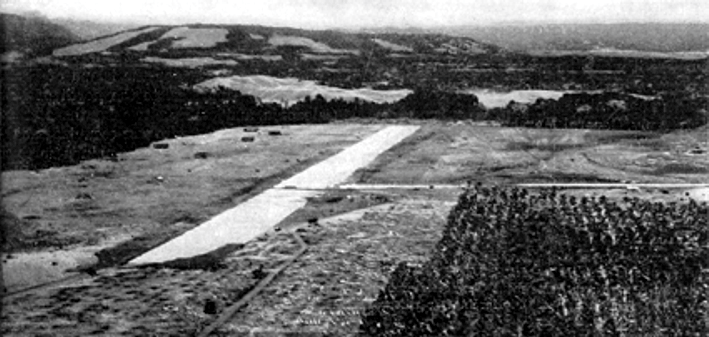
The airfield at Lunga Point on Guadalcanal under construction by the Japanese in July 1942

Despite the damaging air attacks to their ships and landing forces, the Japanese proceeded with the construction of the naval seaplane base at Tulagi and Gavutu, receiving more shipments of troops and construction workers over the next several months. The base was soon operational with aircraft from the Yokohama Air Group which conducted air reconnaissance patrols throughout the surrounding area beginning on 6 May. On 27 May, the Japanese inspected the Lunga Point area on Guadalcanal as a possible location to build a large airfield. On 13 June, the Naval General Staff approved the construction of an airfield at that location and on 19 June, Admiral Inoue toured the site in anticipation of the airfield construction effort. The next day, Japanese troops began clearing the area of brush, and on 6 July, a 12-ship convoy delivered 2,000 Korean and Japanese construction workers plus 500 Japanese naval combat troops to conduct the airfield construction effort in earnest. The coastwatchers on Guadalcanal and Allied air reconnaissance observed the Japanese airfield construction efforts. Allied Catalinas and B-17s based at Port Moresby, Efate, Noumea, and Espiritu Santo frequently bombed the Japanese bases on Guadalcanal, Tulagi, and Gavutu over the next several months, but without causing significant damage. Several Japanese float fighters and one Allied bomber were destroyed in aerial combat during the missions.

The Allies were greatly concerned about the Japanese airfield construction effort on Guadalcanal because, when completed, the aircraft operating from the airfield would be a significant threat to Allied operations between Australia, New Zealand, and the U.S. The two strategic victories for the Allies in the battles of the Coral Sea and Midway provided an opportunity to take the initiative and launch an offensive against the Japanese somewhere in the Pacific. An Allied plan to attack the southern Solomons was conceived by U.S. Admiral Ernest King, Commander in Chief, United States Fleet. He proposed the offensive to deny the use of the southern Solomon Islands by the Japanese as bases to threaten the supply routes between the U.S. and Australia, and to use them as starting points for a campaign. His goal was to neutralize or capture the major Japanese base at Rabaul while also supporting the Allied New Guinea campaign, with the eventual goal of opening the way for the U.S. to retake the Philippines. The Allied commander-in chief for Pacific forces, U.S. Admiral Chester Nimitz, created the South Pacific theater with U.S. Vice Admiral Robert L. Ghormley in command to direct the Allied offensive in the Solomons.

The failure of the Japanese to take Port Moresby and their defeat at Midway had the effect of leaving their base at Tulagi without effective protection from other Japanese bases. Tulagi was four hours flying time from Rabaul, the nearest large Japanese base. On 7 August 1942, 11,000 U.S. Marines landed on Guadalcanal and 3,000 U.S. Marines landed on Tulagi and nearby islands. The Japanese troops on Tulagi and nearby islands were outnumbered and killed almost to the last man in the Battle of Tulagi and Gavutu-Tanambogo while the U.S. Marines on Guadalcanal captured the airfield at Lunga Point without significant resistance. Thus began the Guadalcanal campaign that resulted in a series of large, combined-arms battles between Allied and Japanese forces over the next six months which—along with the New Guinea campaign—would decide the fate of Japanese efforts to secure the southern frontier of their empire in the Pacific.
