= Japanese destroyer Kikuzuki (1926) =

One of twelve Mutsuki-class destroyers built for the Imperial Japanese Navy

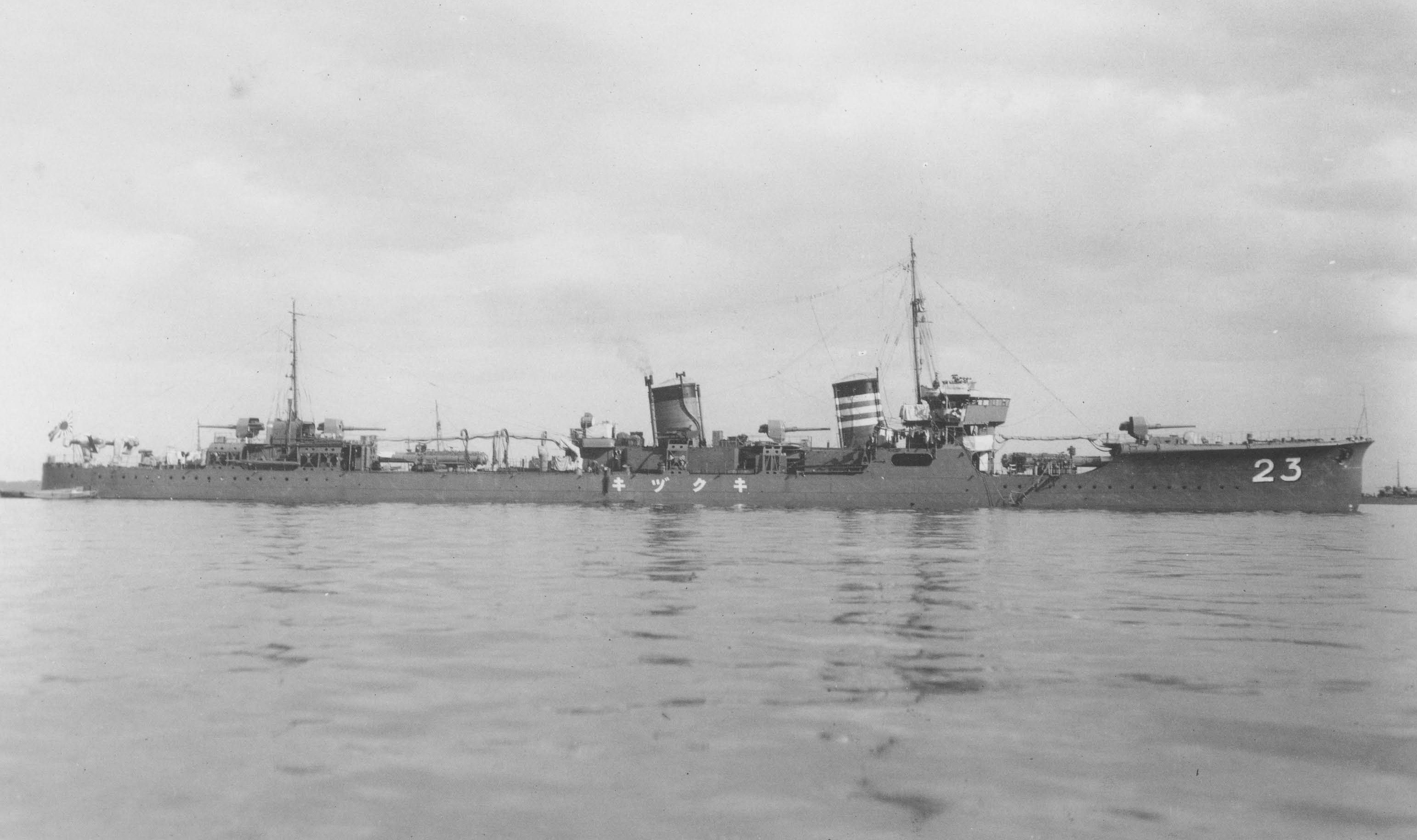
- Kikuzuki in October 1932

History

Empire of Japan
- Name: Kikuzuki
- Namesake: September
- Builder: Maizuru Naval Arsenal, Maizuru
- Laid down: 15 June 1925 as Destroyer No. 31
- Launched: 15 May 1926
- Completed: 20 November 1926
- Renamed: As Kikuzuki, 1 August 1928
- Stricken: 25 May 1942
- Fate: Sank 5 May 1942

General characteristics
- Class & type: Mutsuki-class destroyer
- Displacement: 1,336 t (1,315 long tons) (normal); 1,800 t (1,772 long tons) (deep load)
- Length: 97.54 m (320 ft 0 in) (pp); 102.4 m (335 ft 11 in) (o/a)
- Beam: 9.16 m (30 ft 1 in)
- Draft: 2.96 m (9 ft 9 in)
- Installed power: 38,500 shp (28,700 kW); 4 × Kampon water-tube boilers
- Propulsion: 2 shafts; 2 × Kampon geared steam turbines
- Speed: 37.25 knots (68.99 km/h; 42.87 mph)
- Range: 4,000 nmi (7,400 km; 4,600 mi) at 15 knots (28 km/h; 17 mph)
- Complement: 150
- Armament: 4 × 12 cm (4.7 in) Type 3 guns; 2 × triple 61 cm (24 in) torpedo tubes; 18 × depth charges; 16 × mines

Service record
- Part of: Destroyer Division 23
- Operations: Second Sino-Japanese War; Invasion of Guam; Solomon Islands campaign

The Japanese destroyer Kikuzuki (菊月, means "Chrysanthemum Moon", and means the 9th month in the lunar calendar) was one of twelve Mutsuki-class destroyers built for the Imperial Japanese Navy (IJN) during the 1920s. During the Pacific War, she participated in the Battle of Guam in December 1941 and the New Guinea and Solomon Islands Campaigns in 1942. Kikuzuki was destroyed during the invasion of Tulagi in May.

== Design and description ==
The Mutsuki class was an improved version of the Kamikaze-class destroyers and was the first with triple 61-centimeter (24 in) torpedo tubes. The ships had an overall length of 102.4 meters (335 ft 11 in) and were 94.54 meters (310 ft 2 in) between perpendiculars. They had a beam of 9.16 meters (30 ft 1 in), and a mean draft of 2.96 meters (9 ft 9 in). The Mutsuki-class ships displaced 1,336 metric tons (1,315 long tons) at standard load and 1,800 metric tons (1,772 long tons) at deep load. They were powered by two Parsons geared steam turbines, each driving one propeller shaft, using steam provided by four Kampon water-tube boilers. The turbines were designed to produce 38,500 shaft horsepower (28,700 kW), which would propel the ships at 37.25 knots (68.99 km/h; 42.87 mph). The ships carried 420 metric tons (413 long tons) of fuel oil which gave them a range of 4,000 nautical miles (7,400 km; 4,600 mi) at 15 knots (28 km/h; 17 mph). Their crew consisted of 150 officers and crewmen.

The main armament of the Mutsuki-class ships consisted of four 12-centimeter (4.7 in) Type 3 guns in single mounts; one gun forward of the superstructure, one between the two funnels and the last pair back to back atop the aft superstructure. The guns were numbered '1' to '4' from front to rear. The ships carried two above-water triple sets of 61-centimeter torpedo tubes; one mount was between the forward superstructure and the forward gun and the other was between the aft funnel and aft superstructure. Four reload torpedoes were provided for the tubes. They carried 18 depth charges and could also carry 16 mines. They could also fitted with minesweeping gear.

Kikuzuki was one of six Mutsuki-class ships reconstructed in 1935–36, with their hulls strengthened, raked caps fitted to the funnels and shields to the torpedo mounts. In 1941–42, most of those ships were converted into fast transports with No. 2 and No. 3 guns removed. In addition, ten license-built 25 mm (1.0 in) Type 96 light AA guns and at least two 13.2 mm (0.5 in) Type 93 anti-aircraft machineguns were installed. The minesweeping gear was replaced by four depth charge throwers and the ships now carried a total of 36 depth charges. These changes reduced their speed to 34 knots (63 km/h; 39 mph) and increased their displacement to 1,944 metric tons (1,913 long tons) at normal load. Three more 25 mm guns may have been added in 1942.

== Construction and career ==
Kikuzuki, built at the Maizuru Naval Arsenal, was laid down on 15 June 1925, launched on 15 May 1926 and completed on 20 November 1926. Originally commissioned simply as Destroyer No. 31, the ship was assigned the name Kikuzuki on 1 August 1928. In the late 1930s, she participated in combat during the Second Sino-Japanese War, covering the landings of Japanese troops in central and southern China, and the invasion of French Indochina.

=== Pacific War ===
At the time of the attack on Pearl Harbor, Kikuzuki was part of Desron 23 under Carrier Division 2 in the IJN 1st Air Fleet, and deployed from Hahajima in the Ogasawara Islands as part of the Japanese invasion force for the invasion of Guam. She returned to Truk in early January 1942 to join the invasion force for Operation R in Kavieng, New Ireland on 23 January, returning to Truk one month later. In March, Kikuzuki assisted in covering landings of Japanese forces during Operation SR in the northern Solomon Islands, Lae and Admiralty Islands. She was reassigned to the IJN 4th Fleet on 10 April.

Participating in Operation Mo, during the invasion of Tulagi from 3 to 4 May 1942, Kikuzuki was torpedoed while in Tulagi harbor by United States Navy aircraft from the aircraft carrier USS Yorktown on 4 May, killing 12 crewmen and injuring 22 others. The submarine chaser Toshi Maru No.3 towed her to the beach at Gavutu Island and took off the survivors. Kikuzuki then slid back into the water on 5 May 1942 during the next high tide cycle and sank at coordinates 09°07′S 160°12′E. Kikuzuki was struck from the Navy List on 25 May 1942.

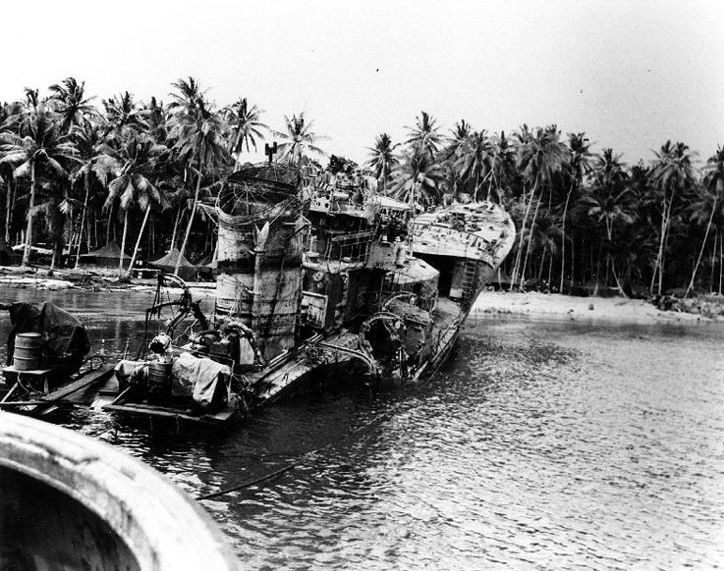
The rusting hulk of Kikuzuki, photographed on Tulagi in August 1943 after U.S. forces dragged the wreckage onto the beach.

After the capture of Tulagi by American forces, the U.S. Navy repair ship USS Prometheus salvaged Kikuzuki′s wreck, hoping to obtain military intelligence. Kikuzuki′s partially-dismantled hulk still lies in Ghovana Bay on the island of Nggela Sule (location 09°07′25″S 160°14′15″E).
