= Kiyohide Shima =

Japanese Navy admiral

- 志摩 清英
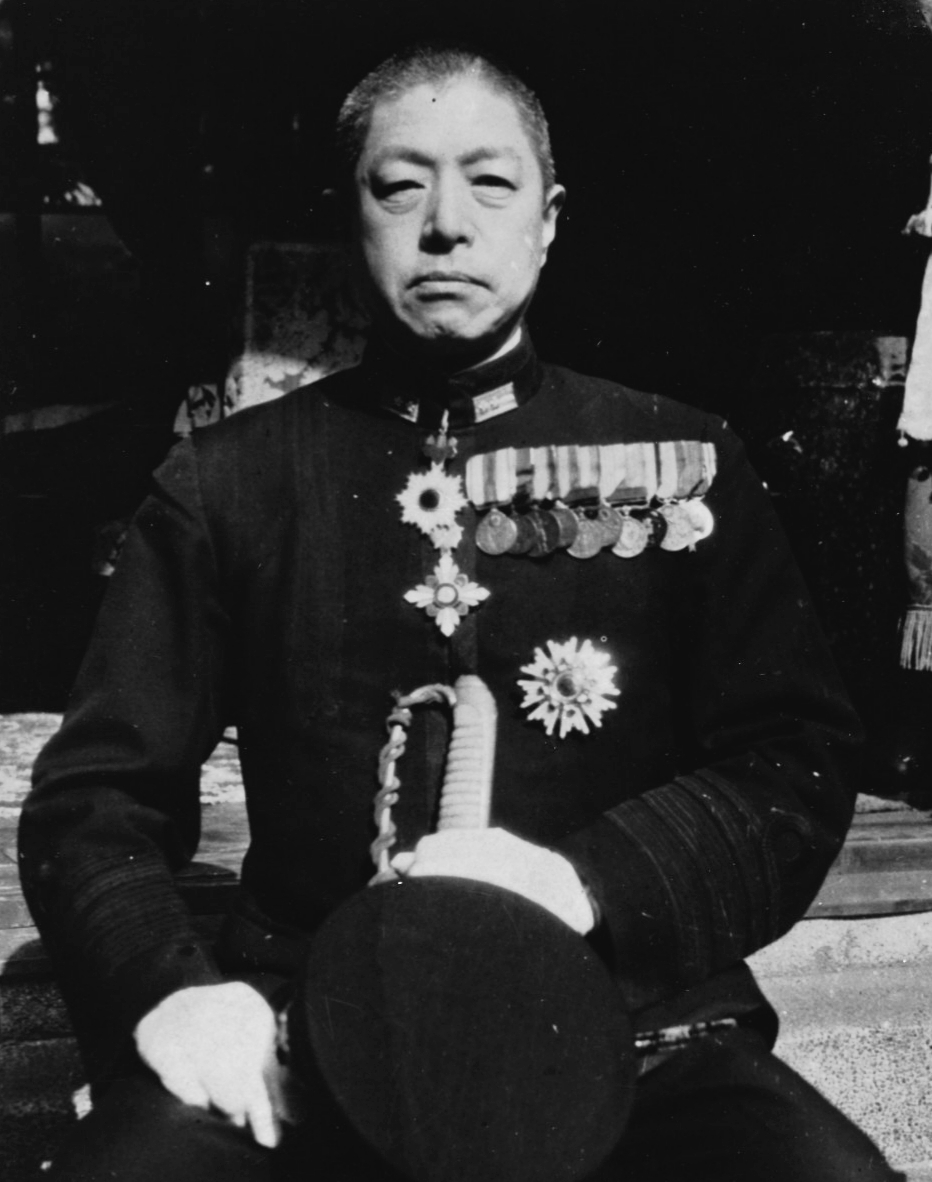
- Born: 25 February 1890; Miyazaki prefecture, Japan
- Died: 7 November 1973 (aged 83)
- Military career
- Allegiance: Empire of Japan
- Branch: Imperial Japanese Navy
- Service years: 1911–1946
- Rank: Vice Admiral
- Commands: Ōi, 19th Squadron, 16th Squadron, Yokosuka Naval Communication School, 5th Fleet, 1st Air Fleet, Takao Guard District
- Conflicts: World War II; Pacific War; Invasion of Tulagi; Battle of Leyte Gulf
- Awards: Order of the Rising Sun (4th class); Order of the Sacred Treasure (2nd class)

Kiyohide Shima (志摩 清英, Shima Kiyohide; 25 February 1890 – 7 November 1973) was an admiral in the Imperial Japanese Navy during World War II.

== Biography ==
A native of Miyazaki prefecture, Shima was a graduate of the 39th class of the Imperial Japanese Naval Academy in 1911, ranking 69th out of 148 cadets. As a midshipman, he served aboard the cruisers Aso and Hashidate and the battleship Aki. As an ensign, he was assigned to the battleship Iwami, and as a sub-lieutenant, he served on the battlecruiser Ibuki, and cruiser Katori.

Shima was promoted to lieutenant in 1918, and after taking courses in torpedo warfare and navigation, was assigned as Chief Communications Officer on the battlecruiser Kirishima. In 1921, he graduated from the Naval War College and was promoted to lieutenant commander. In 1925–1926, Shima was appointed aide-de-camp to Prince Takamatsu Nobuhito, concurrently serving on the battleships Nagato and Fusō. In 1928–1929, he was sent to the United States and Europe. On his return, he served in a number of staff positions, primarily as an instructor at various naval ordnance schools. In 1933, he was promoted to captain, and in 1936, he received his first command, the cruiser Ōi. Shima became a rear admiral on 15 November 1939 and was Chief of Staff of the Maizuru Naval District.

=== Pacific War ===
With the start of the Pacific War, Shima was given a combat command, and led the Tulagi invasion force that occupied Tulagi in the Solomon Islands on 3 May 1942 as part of Operation Mo. Shima was promoted to vice admiral on 1 May 1943, and on 15 February 1944 became commander in chief of the IJN 5th Fleet.

During the Battle of Leyte Gulf, 23–26 October 1944, Shima led the "Second Striking Force" of three cruisers and seven destroyers in the Battle of Surigao Strait. Vice-Admiral Shōji Nishimura's and Vice-Admiral Shima's fleets were collectively called the "Southern Force". Because of the strict radio silence imposed on the forces, Shima was unable to synchronize his movements with those of Nishimura's. Shima's force—two heavy cruisers, a light cruiser and four destroyers—reached the battle after Nishimura's forces had run into a trap and lost two battleships and three destroyers. In the pre-dawn hours of 25 October 1944, as Shima's flotilla entered the strait, they came under attack from a squadron of American PT boats. PT-137 fired a torpedo at one of Shima's destroyers, but it ran deep and passed beneath the target to strike Abukuma at 0325 near the No. 1 boiler room, killing 37 crewmen. During the nighttime battle, Shima fired 16 torpedoes at two islands he mistook for American ships. Then, seeing what he thought were the wrecks of both of Nishimura's battleships, he ordered a retreat, "At that time, things flashed in my head were thus: ... If we continued dashing further north, it was quite clear that we should only fall into a ready trap." Retreating before coming into range of the United States Navy (USN) battleships and cruisers, Shima's flagship, the heavy cruiser Nachi, collided with Nishimura's heavy cruiser Mogami, flooding the latter's steering room. Mogami fell behind in the retreat and was sunk by U.S. aircraft the next morning. Aside from the collision damage to heavy cruiser Nachi and a PT torpedo hit to light cruiser Abukuma, Shima's forces were unscathed.

While under repair at Manila on 29 October, Nachi and Kumano were attacked by aircraft from USN Task Force 38. Nachi was hit by a single bomb to her aircraft deck, and this, as well as strafing attacks, killed 53 crewmen and further delayed repairs. On 5 November, Shima, was ashore for a conference, but arrived at dockside in time to see Nachi being attacked by three waves of U.S. aircraft from the aircraft carriers USS Lexington and Ticonderoga. The cruiser escaped the first wave undamaged, but was hit by five bombs and two or three torpedoes in the second wave while attempting to get underway. During the third wave, Nachi was hit by five torpedoes in her port side, which severed her bow and stern, and by an additional 20 bombs and 16 rockets. The central portion of the vessel sank in 102 feet (31 m) of water about 12 nautical miles (22 km) northeast of Corregidor (around 14°31′N 120°44′E).

After losing his flagship, Shima was reassigned to command the Takao Guard District from 10 May 1945 to 30 November 1945. From 10 May to 15 June 1945, he was also final commander of the First Air Fleet.

=== Postwar ===
In 1959, in response to a letter from an American teenager of San Fernando, California, Shima defended his actions and performance in the Battle of Surigao Strait. In particular, Shima found fault with historian James A. Field Jr who, in reference to the utter defeat of Japanese forces in the battle, referred to Shima as "the buffoon of the tragedy."

== Books ==
- D'Albas, Andrieu (1965). Death of a Navy: Japanese Naval Action in World War II. Devin-Adair Pub. ISBN 0-8159-5302-X.
- Dull, Paul S. (1978). A Battle History of the Imperial Japanese Navy, 1941-1945. Naval Institute Press. ISBN 0-87021-097-1.
- Field, James A. (1947). The Japanese at Leyte Gulf;: The Sho operation. Princeton University Press. ASIN B0006AR6LA.
- Lacroix, Eric; Linton Wells (1997). Japanese Cruisers of the Pacific War. Naval Institute Press. ISBN 0-87021-311-3.
- Morison, Samuel Eliot (2002). Leyte, June 1944-January 1945, vol. 12 of History of United States Naval Operations in World War II (reissue ed.). Champaign, Illinois, US: University of Illinois Press. ISBN 0-252-07063-1.
- Sheftall, M.G. (2005). Blossoms in the Wind: Human Legacies of the Kamikaze. NAL Caliber. ISBN 0-451-21487-0.
