= Hainan Island operation order of battle =

Following are the units and commanders involved in the Hainan Island Operation, fought 10 February 1939 as part of a campaign by the Empire of Japan during the Second Sino-Japanese War to blockade the Guangdong mainland of the Republic of China and prevent it from communicating with the outside world and from receiving imports of much-needed arms and materials.

== Japan ==
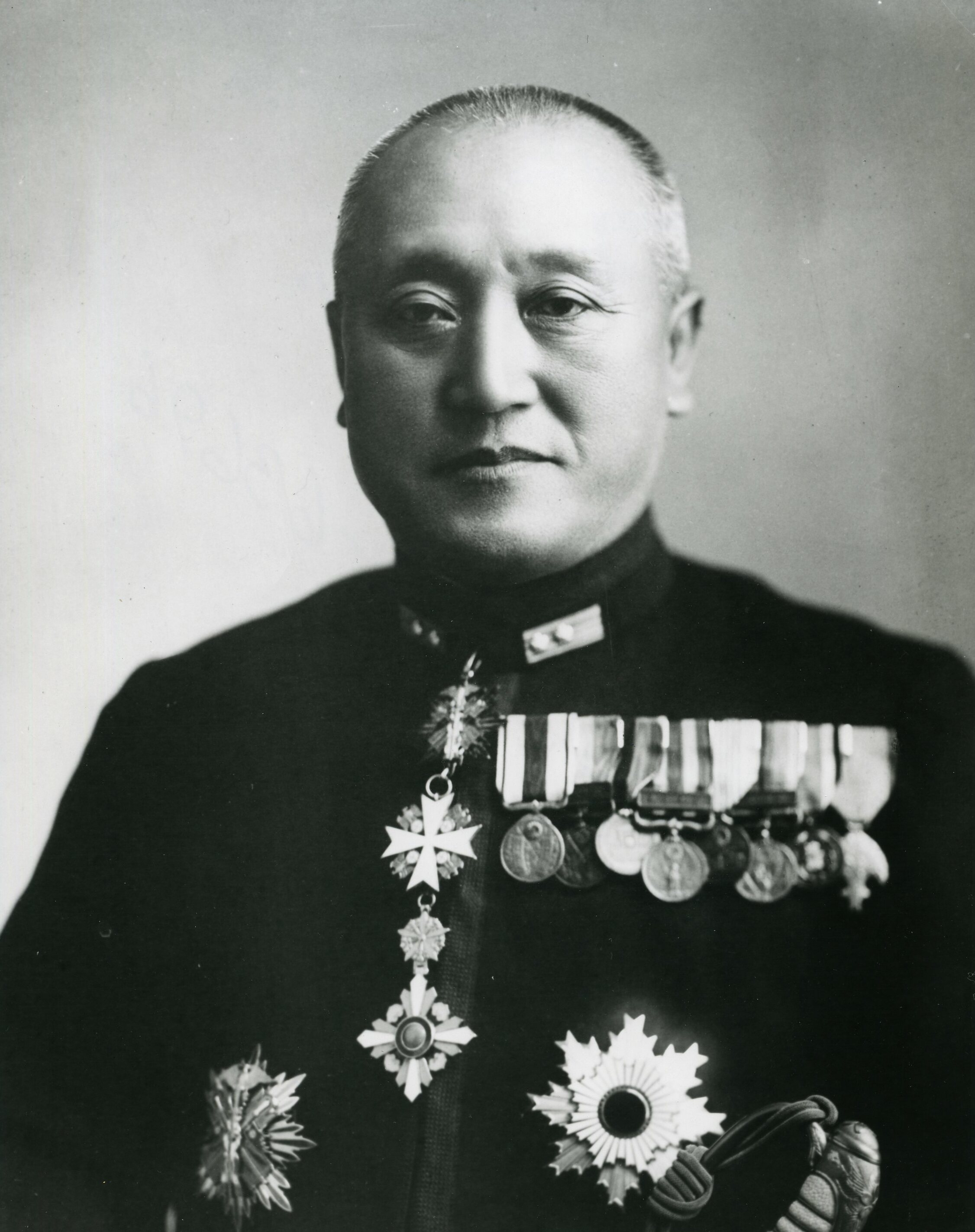
Vice Adm. Kondō Nobutake

Hainan Conquest Forces
Vice Admiral Kondō Nobutake

=== Ground ===
4th Base Force [IJN]

Yokosuka 4th SNLF
Kure 6th SNLF
Sasebo 8th SNLF

5th Garrison Unit [IJA]
Taiwan Mixed Brigade
Major Gen. Iida

Taiwan 1st Infantry Regiment
Taiwan 2nd Infantry Regiment
Taiwan Mountain Gun Regiment

=== Naval ===
Cruisers

1 Myoko-class heavy cruiser (10 × 8-in. main battery, 16 × 24-in. torpedo tubes, 33.75 knots)

Myoko (flagship)

2 Nagara-class light cruisers (7 × 5.5-in. main battery, 8 × 24-in. torpedo tubes, 36 knots)

Nagara
Natori

23rd Destroyer Group

4 Mutsuki-class destroyers (4 × 4.7-in. main battery, 6 × Type 12 torpedo tubes, 37.25 knots)

Mochizuki, Mutsuki, Mikazuki, Kikuzuki

28th Destroyer Group

2 Kamikaze (1922)-class destroyers (4 × 4.7-in. main battery, 6 × 21-in. torpedo tubes, 37.25 knots)

Yūnagi, Asanagi

45th Destroyer Group

2 Kamikaze (1905)-class destroyers (2 × 12-pdr. main battery, 2 × 18-in. torpedo tubes, 29 knots)

Matsukaze, Asakaze

12th Minesweeper Group
1st Air Sentai

1 fleet carrier: Akagi
1 light carrier: Chiyoda
1st Air Unit

14th Kōkūtai
16th Kōkūtai

== China ==
Defense of Hainan
Wang Yi

5th Security Brigade – Wang Yi

2 Security Regiments – About 1,600 men
7 Guard Battalions (newly formed from residents) – 1,750 men

Communist Independent Battalion – 300 men
Xiuying Battery Garrisons (still undergoing organization) – 250 men

== Sources ==
Guo Rugui, ed. (July 2005). China's Anti-Japanese War Combat Operations. Jiangsu People's Publishing House. ISBN 7-214-03034-9.
