= Japanese destroyer Yayoi (1925) =

Destroyer of the Imperial Japanese Navy

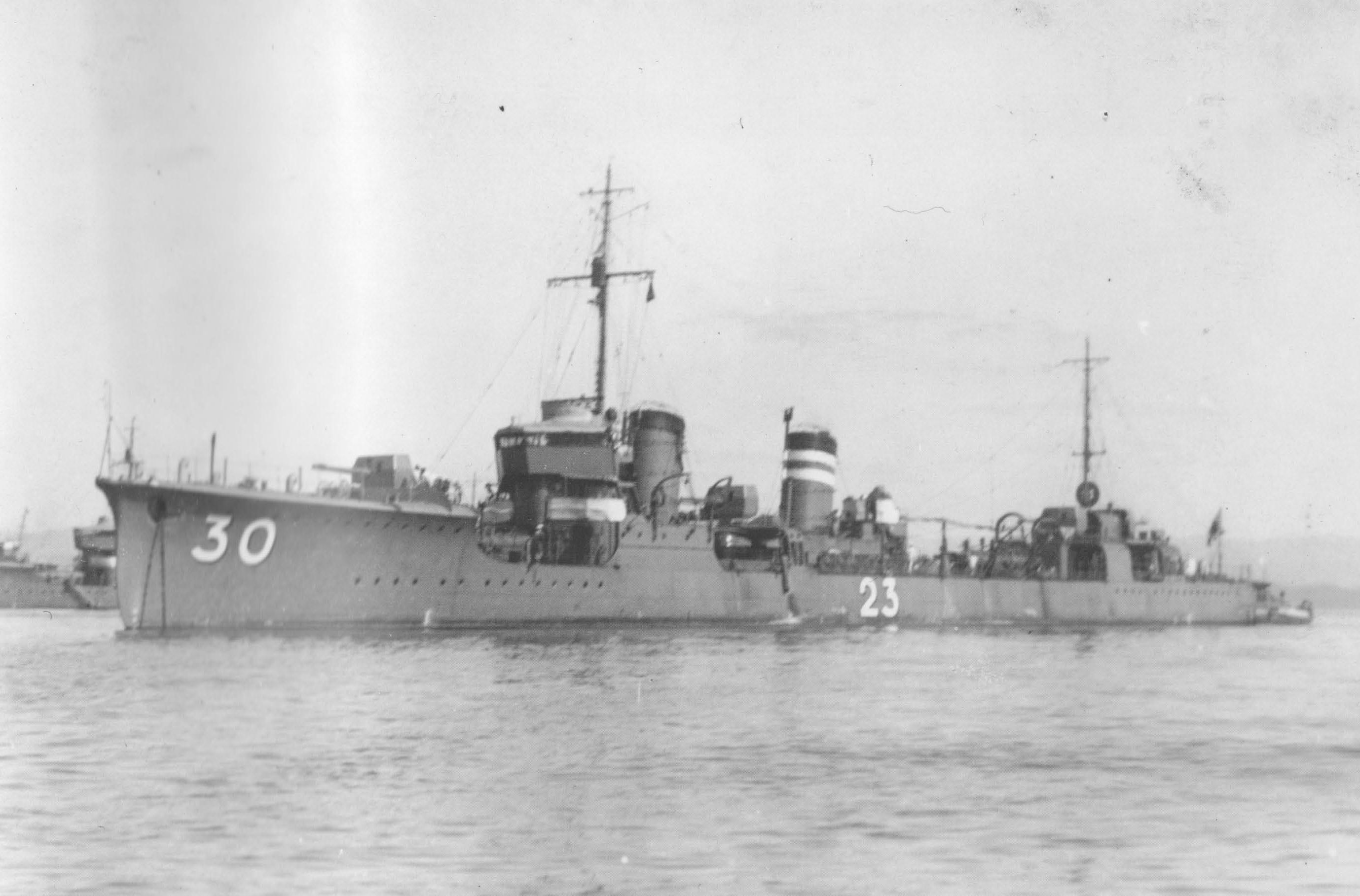
- Yayoi in February 1927

History

Empire of Japan
- Name: Yayoi
- Namesake: March
- Builder: Uraga Dock Company, Uraga
- Laid down: 11 January 1924 as Destroyer No. 23
- Launched: 11 July 1925
- Completed: 28 August 1926
- Renamed: As Yayoi, 1 August 1928
- Stricken: 20 October 1942
- Fate: Sunk by American aircraft, 11 September 1942

General characteristics
- Type: Mutsuki-class destroyer
- Displacement: 1,336 t (1,315 long tons) (normal); 1,800 t (1,772 long tons) (deep load)
- Length: 97.54 m (320 ft 0 in) (pp); 102.4 m (335 ft 11 in) (o/a)
- Beam: 9.16 m (30 ft 1 in)
- Draft: 2.96 m (9 ft 9 in)
- Installed power: 38,500 shp (28,700 kW); 4 × Kampon water-tube boilers
- Propulsion: 2 shafts; 2 × Kampon geared steam turbines
- Speed: 37.25 knots (68.99 km/h; 42.87 mph)
- Range: 4,000 nmi (7,400 km; 4,600 mi) at 15 knots (28 km/h; 17 mph)
- Complement: 150
- Armament: 4 × 12 cm (4.7 in) Type 3 guns; 2 × triple 61 cm (24 in) torpedo tubes; 18 × depth charges; 16 × mines

Service record
- Part of: Destroyer Division 30
- Operations: Second Sino-Japanese War; Battle of Wake Island; Solomon Islands campaign; New Guinea Campaign

The Japanese destroyer Yayoi (弥生, "March") was one of twelve Mutsuki-class destroyers built for the Imperial Japanese Navy (IJN) during the 1920s. During the Pacific War, she participated in the Battle of Wake Island in December 1941 and the occupations of New Guinea and the Solomon Islands in early 1942.

== Design and description ==
The Mutsuki class was an improved version of the Kamikaze-class destroyers and was the first with triple 61-centimeter (24 in) torpedo tubes. The ships had an overall length of 102.4 meters (335 ft 11 in) and were 94.54 meters (310 ft 2 in) between perpendiculars. They had a beam of 9.16 meters (30 ft 1 in), and a mean draft of 2.96 meters (9 ft 9 in). The Mutsuki-class ships displaced 1,336 metric tons (1,315 long tons) at standard load and 1,800 metric tons (1,772 long tons) at deep load. They were powered by two Parsons geared steam turbines, each driving one propeller shaft, using steam provided by four Kampon water-tube boilers. The turbines were designed to produce 38,500 shaft horsepower (28,700 kW), which would propel the ships at 37.25 knots (68.99 km/h; 42.87 mph). The ships carried 420 metric tons (413 long tons) of fuel oil which gave them a range of 4,000 nautical miles (7,400 km; 4,600 mi) at 15 knots (28 km/h; 17 mph). Their crew consisted of 150 officers and crewmen.

The main armament of the Mutsuki-class ships consisted of four 12-centimeter (4.7 in) Type 3 guns in single mounts; one gun forward of the superstructure, one between the two funnels and the last pair back to back atop the aft superstructure. The guns were numbered '1' to '4' from front to rear. The ships carried two above-water triple sets of 61-centimeter torpedo tubes; one mount was between the forward superstructure and the forward gun and the other was between the aft funnel and aft superstructure. Four reload torpedoes were provided for the tubes. They carried 18 depth charges and could also carry 16 mines. They could also fitted with minesweeping gear.

== Construction and career ==
Yayoi was laid down by the Uraga Dock Company at its shipyard in Uraga on 11 January 1924, launched on 11 July 1925 and completed on 28 August 1926. Originally commissioned simply as Destroyer No. 23, the vessel was assigned the name Yayoi on 1 August 1928. In the late 1930s, Yayoi participated in combat during the Second Sino-Japanese War and later in the Invasion of French Indochina in 1940.

=== Pacific War ===
At the time of the attack on Pearl Harbor on 7 December 1941, Yayoi was assigned to Destroyer Division 30 under Destroyer Squadron 6 of the 4th Fleet. She sortied from Kwajalein on 8 December as part of the Wake Island invasion force. This consisted of the light cruisers Yūbari, Tenryū, and Tatsuta, the destroyers Yayoi, Hayate, Mutsuki, Kisaragi, Oite, and Mochizuki, two old Momi-class vessels converted to patrol boats (Patrol Boat No. 32 and Patrol Boat No. 33), and two troop transports containing 450 Japanese Special Naval Landing Forces (SNLF) troops.

The Japanese approached the island early on the morning of 11 December, and the warships began to bombard the island at a range of 8,200 meters (9,000 yd) at 05:30. As none of the six American 5-inch (12.7 cm) coast-defense guns replied, Rear Admiral Sadamichi Kajioka, commander of the invasion forces, ordered his ships to close the island, believing that the American guns had been destroyed by the earlier aerial attacks. Encouraging this, Major James Devereux, commander of the United States Marine garrison, had ordered his men to hold their fire until he gave the order to do so. After the Japanese ships had closed to a range of 4,100 meters (4,500 yd), he ordered his guns to open fire. They did so with great effect, sinking Hayate, near-missing Kajioka's flagship Yubari, and causing to him to order his forces to disengage. During this time, Yayoi was hit by a 5-inch shell, which killed one man and wounded 17 others. Yayoi returned on 23 December with the second (and ultimately successful) Wake Island invasion force before returning to Kwajalein.

The ship escorted a convoy from Kwajalein to the naval base at Truk in January 1942, where a sponson was installed for a pair of license-built 13.2 mm (0.5 in) Type 93 anti-aircraft machineguns on the forward side of the bridge. Yayoi then escorted a troop convoy from Truk to Guam later that month, and then joined the invasion of the Solomon Islands, covering the landings of Japanese forces during Operation R (the invasion of Rabaul, New Ireland and New Britain), and during Operation SR (the invasion of Lae and Salamaua on New Guinea) in January–March. From 28 March to 1 April, she participated in the initial occupation of the Shortland Islands and Bougainville in the Solomon Islands. Later that month, the ship supported the occupation of the Admiralty Islands.

During the Battle of the Coral Sea from 7–8 May 1942, Yayoi was assigned to the Operation Mo invasion force for Port Moresby. After that operation was cancelled, she returned to Japan in July for refitting at the Sasebo Naval Arsenal.

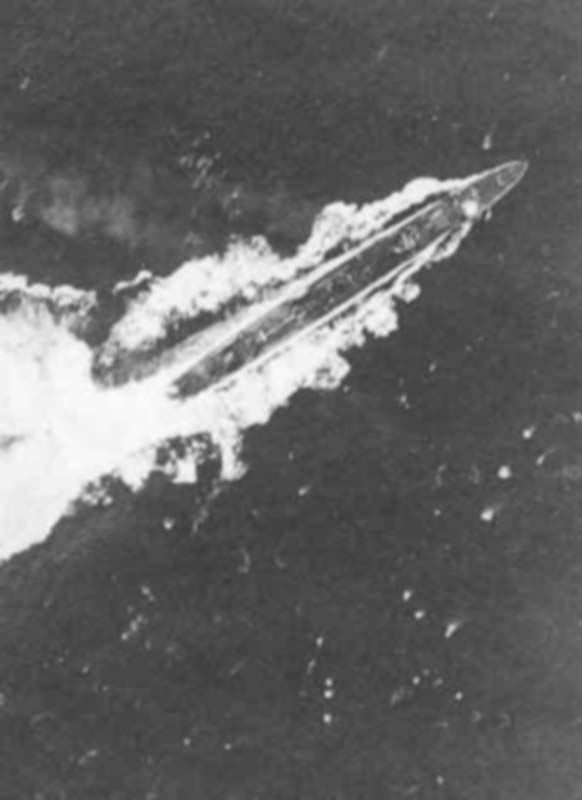
Yayoi under attack near New Guinea on 11 September 1942

After repairs were completed in mid-July Yayoi was reassigned to the IJN 8th Fleet and participated in the bombardment of Henderson Field on 24 August 1942. During the Battle of the Eastern Solomons on 25 August 1942, Yayoi rescued survivors from her sister ship Mutsuki, which had been sunk in an attack by USAAF B-17 Flying Fortress bombers.

At the end of August, Yayoi made a number of Tokyo Express troop transport runs to Milne, New Guinea. From early September, it began participating in Operation Ke, the evacuation of Japanese forces from Guadalcanal. On 11 September 1942, after departing Rabaul on an evacuation mission to Goodenough Island, Yayoi came under attack by Allied B-17 Flying Fortress and B-25 Mitchell bombers, 8 nautical miles (15 km; 9 mi) northwest of Vakuta Island at coordinates 08°45′S 151°25′E. The attack also killed the commander of Destroyer Division 30, Captain Shiro Yasutake. Taking on water uncontrollably, Yayoi's captain, Lieutenant Commander Shizuka Kajimoto, gave the decision to abandon ship. The destroyers Mochizuki and Isokaze later rescued 83 survivors from nearby Normanby Island. Yayoi was struck from the Navy List on 20 October 1942.
