= Japanese destroyer Mikazuki =

Two destroyers of the Imperial Japanese Navy were named Mikazuki:

- Japanese destroyer Mikazuki (1906), a Kamikaze-class destroyer launched in 1906 and scuttled in 1930
- Japanese destroyer Mikazuki (1926), a Mutsuki-class destroyer launched in 1926 and sunk in 1943
