= Sadamichi Kajioka =

Japanese admiral (1891–1944)

- 梶岡 定道
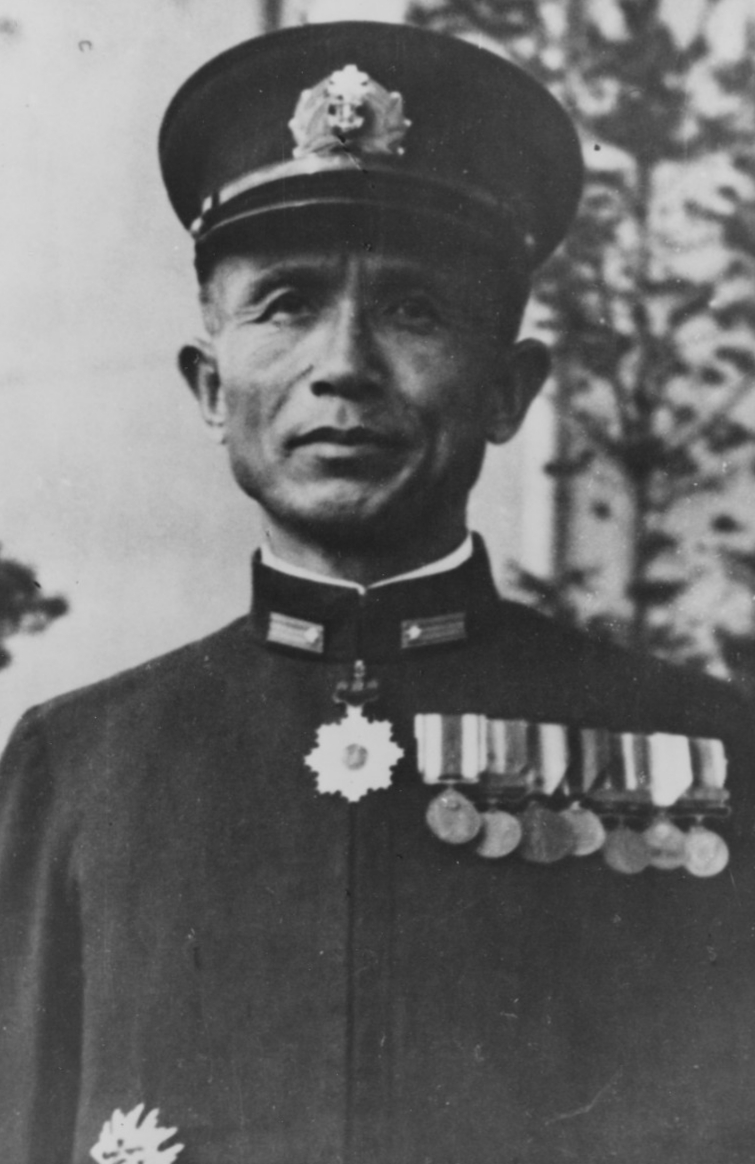
- Kajioka in 1944
- Born: May 18, 1891; Ehime Prefecture, Japan
- Died: September 12, 1944 (aged 53) off Hainan, Japanese-occupied China
- Military career
- Allegiance: Empire of Japan
- Branch: Imperial Japanese Navy
- Service years: 1911–1944
- Rank: Vice admiral (posthumous)
- Commands: Nagara; Kasuga; Kiso; Wake Island Invasion Force; Port Moresby Invasion Force; No. 6 Escort Division
- Conflicts: World War II; Battle of Wake Island; Battle of the Coral Sea; Take Ichi convoy

Sadamichi Kajioka (梶岡 定道, Kajioka Sadamichi; May 18, 1891 – September 12, 1944) was an admiral in the Imperial Japanese Navy during World War II. He directed Japanese forces involved in the Battle of Wake Island.

== Biography ==
A native of Ehime prefecture, Kajioka graduated from the 39th class of the Imperial Japanese Naval Academy in 1911. He placed sixth out of 138 cadets. He served as midshipman on the cruisers Aso and Tokiwa, and after being commissioned as an ensign, on the Akitsushima. His training was in navigation, and after his promotion to lieutenant he served as chief navigator on the Kiso, Chikuma and Kasuga. Kajioka was promoted to lieutenant commander in 1924, and was assigned as chief navigator to the Asama, Nachi and battleship Mutsu.

Kajioka was given his first command of a warship on December 1, 1935, when he was promoted to captain of the Nagara. He subsequently commanded Kasuga and Kiso.

Kajioka was promoted to rear admiral on November 15, 1940. At the start of the Pacific War, Kajioka was in command of the Wake Island invasion force, consisting of Cruiser Division 18 with the cruisers Tenryū, Tatsuta, Yubari; Destroyer Division 29 (Hayate, Oite); Destroyer Division 30 (Kisaragi, Mochizuki, Mutsuki, Yayoi); and transports with the No. 2 Maizuru Special Naval Landing Force.

Overly confident that the island's defenses had been reduced by air bombardment, his forces suffered heavy casualties in the first phase of the Battle of Wake Island before being forced to retreat. Hayate and Kisaragi were sunk, and Yubari was hit 11 times by shells fired by the Marine defenders. Perhaps surprisingly for the Japanese Naval Command, he was not relieved of his command after this failure, allowing him a second try. The second assault on Wake Island, reinforced with heavy cruisers and the aircraft carriers Sōryū and Hiryū, was more successful.

Kajioka was then assigned to command the invasion of Lae, New Guinea, in March 1942. He narrowly escaped disaster when the US Navy launched a counterattack across the Owen Stanley Range, which damaged many ships in the invasion fleet, but after troops and supplies had already been landed.

Kajioka was later in the Battle of the Coral Sea in May 1942 as commander of the Port Moresby invasion force. However, the invasion was cancelled before troops could be landed. Kajioka was recalled to Japan, and was sent to the reserves from the end of 1942 through early 1944. He was reactivated, and given command of the No. 6 Escort Division on April 8, 1944. In April and May he commanded the Take Ichi convoy, which suffered heavy losses while carrying two Army divisions from China to New Guinea.

Kajioka was killed in action on September 12, 1944, when his destroyer Shikinami was torpedoed by USS Growler east of Hainan. He was posthumously promoted to vice admiral.
