= Japanese destroyer Oite (1924) =

Kamikaze-class destroyer built for the Imperial Japanese Navy during the 1920s

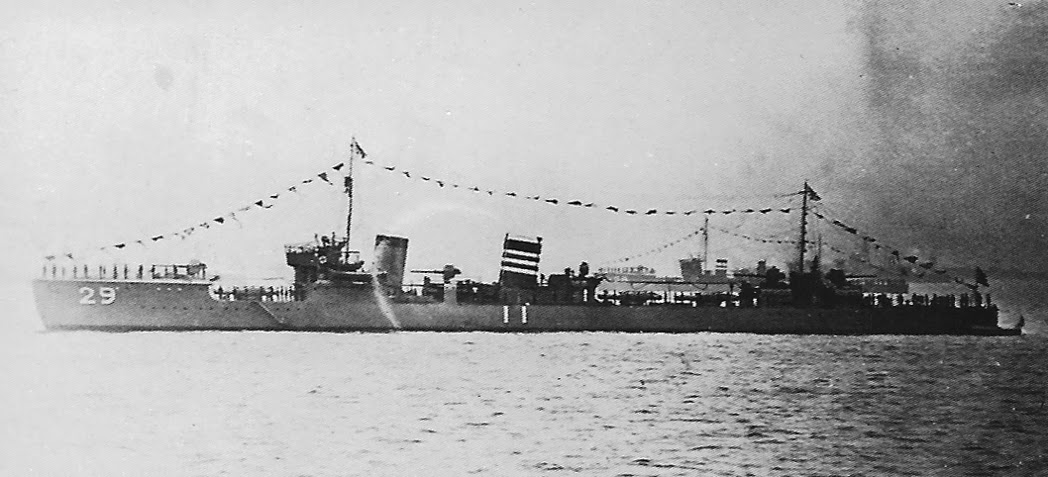
- Oite off Yokohama, 1927

History

Empire of Japan
- Name: Oite
- Builder: Uraga Dock Company, Uraga
- Laid down: 16 March 1923 as Destroyer No. 11
- Launched: 27 November 1924
- Completed: 30 October 1925
- Renamed: Oite, 1 August 1928
- Stricken: 11 March 1944
- Fate: Sunk by American aircraft, 18 February 1944

General characteristics
- Class & type: Kamikaze-class destroyer
- Displacement: 1,422 t (1,400 long tons) (normal); 1,747 t (1,719 long tons) (deep load)
- Length: 97.5 m (319 ft 11 in) (pp); 102.5 m (336 ft 3 in) (o/a)
- Beam: 9.1 m (29 ft 10 in)
- Draft: 2.9 m (9 ft 6 in)
- Installed power: 38,500 shp (28,700 kW); 4 × Kampon water-tube boilers
- Propulsion: 2 shafts; 2 × Kampon geared steam turbines
- Speed: 37.3 knots (69.1 km/h; 42.9 mph)
- Range: 3,600 nmi (6,700 km; 4,100 mi) at 14 knots (26 km/h; 16 mph)
- Complement: 148
- Armament: 4 × single 12 cm (4.7 in) Type 3 guns; 3 × twin 53.3 cm (21.0 in) torpedo tubes

Service record
- Operations: Battle of Wake Island; Solomon Islands Campaign; Operation Hailstone

The Japanese destroyer Oite (追風, "Tail Wind") was one of nine Kamikaze-class destroyers built for the Imperial Japanese Navy during the 1920s.During the Pacific War, she participated in the Battle of Wake Island in December 1941 and the occupations of New Guinea and the Solomon Islands in early 1942.

== Design and description ==
The Kamikaze class was an improved version of the Minekaze-class destroyers. The ships had an overall length of 102.5 meters (336 ft 3 in) and were 97.5 meters (319 ft 11 in) between perpendiculars. They had a beam of 9.1 meters (29 ft 10 in), and a mean draft of 2.9 meters (9 ft 6 in). The Kamikaze-class ships displaced 1,422 metric tons (1,400 long tons) at standard load and 1,747 metric tons (1,719 long tons) at deep load. They were powered by two Parsons geared steam turbines, each driving one propeller shaft, using steam provided by four Kampon water-tube boilers. The turbines were designed to produce 38,500 shaft horsepower (28,700 kW), which would propel the ships at 37.3 knots (69.1 km/h; 42.9 mph). During sea trials, the ships comfortably exceeded their designed speeds, reaching 38.7 to 39.2 knots (71.7 to 72.6 km/h; 44.5 to 45.1 mph). The ships carried 420 metric tons (413 long tons) of fuel oil which gave them a range of 3,600 nautical miles (6,700 km; 4,100 mi) at 14 knots (26 km/h; 16 mph). Their crew consisted of 148 officers and crewmen.

The main armament of the Kamikaze-class ships consisted of four 12-centimeter (4.7 in) Type 3 guns in single mounts; one gun forward of the superstructure, one between the two funnels and the last pair back to back atop the aft superstructure. The guns were numbered '1' to '4' from front to rear. The ships carried three above-water twin sets of 53.3-centimeter (21.0 in) torpedo tubes; one mount was between the forward superstructure and the forward gun and the other two were between the aft funnel and aft superstructure.

Early in the war, the No. 4 gun and the aft torpedo tubes were removed in exchange for four depth charge throwers and 18 depth charges. In addition 10 license-built 25 mm (0.98 in) Type 96 light AA guns were installed. These changes increased their displacement to 1,499 long tons (1,523 t). Survivors had their light AA armament augmented to be between thirteen and twenty 25 mm guns and four 13.2 mm (0.5 in) Type 93 anti-aircraft machineguns by June 1944. These changes reduced their speed to 35 knots (65 km/h; 40 mph).

== Construction and career ==
Oite was laid down by the Uraga Dock Company at its shipyard in Uraga on 16 March 1923, launched on 27 November 1924 and completed on 30 October 1925. Originally commissioned simply as Destroyer No. 11, the ship was assigned the name Oite on 1 August 1928.

=== Pacific War ===
At the time of the attack on Pearl Harbor on 7 December 1941, Oite was the flagship of Destroyer Division 29 under Destroyer Squadron 6 of the 4th Fleet. She sortied from Kwajalein on 8 December as part of the Wake Island invasion force. This consisted of the light cruisers Yūbari, Tenryū, and Tatsuta, the destroyers Yayoi, Hayate, Mutsuki, Oite, Kisaragi, and Mochizuki, two old Momi-class vessels converted to patrol boats (Patrol Boat No. 32 and Patrol Boat No. 33), and two troop transports containing 450 Japanese Special Naval Landing Forces (SNLF) troops.

The Japanese approached the island early on the morning of 11 December, and the warships began to bombard the island at a range of 8,200 meters (9,000 yd) at 05:30. As none of the six American 5-inch (12.7 cm) coast-defense guns replied, Rear Admiral Sadamichi Kajioka, commander of the invasion forces, ordered his ships to close the island, believing that the American guns had been destroyed by the earlier aerial attacks. Encouraging this, Major James Devereux, commander of the United States Marine garrison, had ordered his men to hold their fire until he gave the order to do so. After the Japanese ships had closed to a range of 4,100 meters (4,500 yd), he ordered his guns to open fire. They did so with great effect, sinking Hayate, near-missing Kajioka's flagship Yubari, and causing to him to order his forces to disengage. Oite was slightly damaged by near-misses that also wounded 14 crewmen. The ship returned on 23 December with the second (and ultimately successful) Wake Island invasion force before returning to Kwajalein.

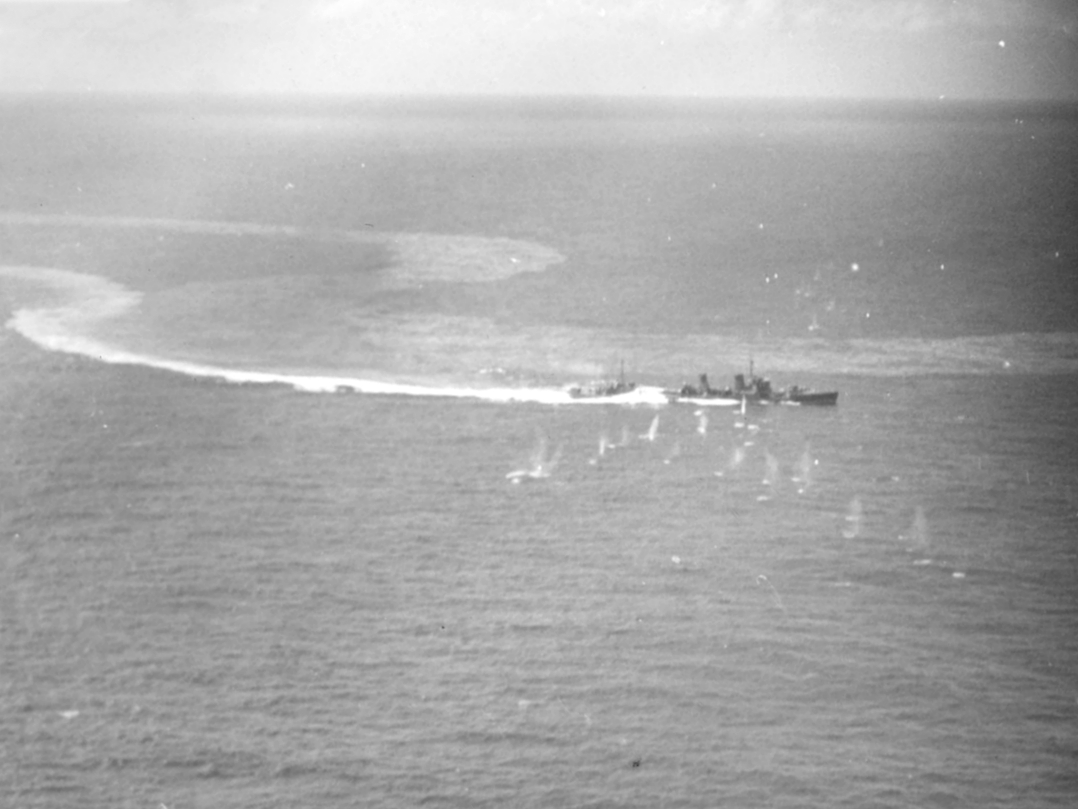
A Japanese destroyer (probably Oite) under U.S. Navy aircraft attack near Truk Lagoon on 18 February 1944

From January through March 1942, Oite provided cover for Japanese forces during Operation R (the invasion of Rabaul, New Britain) and Operation SR (the invasion of Lae and Salamaua), returning to Sasebo Naval Arsenal for repairs in April. In late April, Oite escorted a convoy from Sasebo to Truk. During the Battle of the Coral Sea from 7–8 May 1942, Oite was assigned to the Operation Mo invasion force for Port Moresby in New Guinea. When that operation was cancelled, she was reassigned to the Solomon Islands sector, patrolling from Rabaul and escorting an airfield construction crew from Truk to Bougainville and Guadalcanal. In August 1942, Oite made a "Tokyo Express" troop transport run to Guadalcanal, but at the end of the month was reassigned to cover troop landings on Nauru and Ocean Island during Operation RY.

In September 1942, Oite made patrols in the central Pacific, and escorted troop convoys from Palau to the Solomons through September 1943. Oite was struck by a torpedo on 21 September 1943, while escorting a convoy from Truk, via Saipan to Yokosuka, but the torpedo was a dud and did only minor damage. Oite continued in the escort role through February 1944 between the Japanese home islands and Saipan, and between Saipan and Rabaul, with increasing losses to American submarines.

On 16 February 1944 Oite was escorting the damaged cruiser Agano to Japan from Truk when Agano was torpedoed and sunk by the United States Navy submarine USS Skate. Oite rescued 523 of Agano's crew and turned back towards Truk. However, just as Oite was entering Truk harbor on 18 February, the Japanese base was struck by United States Navy aircraft in Operation Hailstone. Oite was torpedoed, broke in half and sank almost immediately with loss of 172 of 192 crewmen and all 523 survivors of Agano. Oite was struck from the Navy List on 31 March 1944.

The remains of Oite were found in March 1986 at a depth of around 200 feet (61 m) of water, in two sections approximately 40 feet (12 m) apart. The bow section is upside down, with the bridge buried in mud; the afterpart lies on the bottom upright.
