= Japanese destroyer Hayate (1925) =

Destroyer of the Imperial Japanese Navy

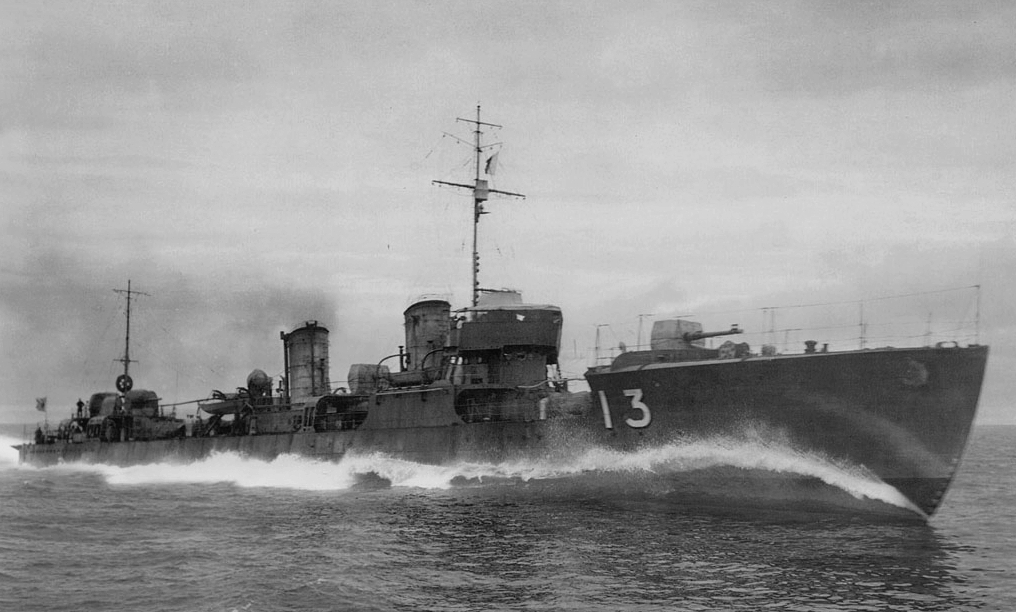
- Hayate on trials, 1925

History

Empire of Japan
- Name: Hayate
- Builder: Ishikawajima Shipyards, Tokyo
- Laid down: 11 November 1922 as Destroyer No. 13
- Launched: 24 March 1925
- Completed: 21 December 1925
- Renamed: Hayate, 1 August 1928
- Fate: Sunk by American coast-defense guns, 11 December 1941

General characteristics
- Class & type: Kamikaze-class destroyer
- Displacement: 1,422 t (1,400 long tons) (normal); 1,747 t (1,719 long tons) (deep load)
- Length: 97.5 m (319 ft 11 in) (pp); 102.5 m (336 ft 3 in) (o/a)
- Beam: 9.1 m (29 ft 10 in)
- Draft: 2.9 m (9 ft 6 in)
- Installed power: 38,500 shp (28,700 kW); 4 × Kampon water-tube boilers
- Propulsion: 2 shafts; 2 × Kampon geared steam turbines
- Speed: 37.3 knots (69.1 km/h; 42.9 mph)
- Range: 3,600 nmi (6,700 km; 4,100 mi) at 14 knots (26 km/h; 16 mph)
- Complement: 148
- Armament: 4 × single 12 cm (4.7 in) Type 3 guns; 3 × twin 53.3 cm (21.0 in) torpedo tubes

Service record
- Part of: Destroyer Division 29
- Operations: Battle of Wake Island

The Japanese destroyer Hayate (疾風, "Gale") was one of nine Kamikaze-class destroyers built for the Imperial Japanese Navy (IJN). During the Pacific War, she was sunk by American coast-defense guns during the Battle of Wake Island in December 1941, the first Japanese warship to be lost during the war. Only a single man of her crew was rescued.

== Design and description ==
The Kamikaze class was an improved version of the Minekaze-class destroyers. The ships had an overall length of 102.5 meters (336 ft 3 in) and were 97.5 meters (319 ft 11 in) between perpendiculars. They had a beam of 9.1 meters (29 ft 10 in), and a mean draft of 2.9 meters (9 ft 6 in). The Kamikaze-class ships displaced 1,422 metric tons (1,400 long tons) at standard load and 1,747 metric tons (1,719 long tons) at deep load. They were powered by two Parsons geared steam turbines, each driving one propeller shaft, using steam provided by four Kampon water-tube boilers. The turbines were designed to produce 38,500 shaft horsepower (28,700 kW), which would propel the ships at 37.3 knots (69.1 km/h; 42.9 mph). During sea trials, the ships comfortably exceeded their designed speeds, reaching 38.7 to 39.2 knots (71.7 to 72.6 km/h; 44.5 to 45.1 mph). The ships carried 420 metric tons (413 long tons) of fuel oil which gave them a range of 3,600 nautical miles (6,700 km; 4,100 mi) at 14 knots (26 km/h; 16 mph). Their crew consisted of 148 officers and crewmen.

The main armament of the Kamikaze-class ships consisted of four 12-centimeter (4.7 in) Type 3 guns in single mounts; one gun forward of the superstructure, one between the two funnels and the last pair back to back atop the aft superstructure. The guns were numbered '1' to '4' from front to rear. The ships carried three above-water twin sets of 53.3-centimeter (21.0 in) torpedo tubes; one mount was between the forward superstructure and the forward gun and the other two were between the aft funnel and aft superstructure. Early in the war, the No. 4 gun and the aft torpedo tubes were removed in exchange for four depth charge throwers and 18 depth charges.

== Construction and career ==
Hayate, built at the Ishikawajima Shipyards in Tokyo, was laid down on 11 November 1922, launched on 24 March 1925 and completed on 21 December 1925. Originally commissioned simply as Destroyer No. 13, the ship was assigned the name Hayate on 1 August 1928.

=== Pacific War ===
At the time of the attack on Pearl Harbor on 7 December 1941, Hayate was assigned to Destroyer Division 29 under Destroyer Squadron 6 of the 4th Fleet. She sortied from Kwajalein on 8 December as part of the Wake Island invasion force. This consisted of the light cruisers Yūbari, Tenryū, and Tatsuta, the destroyers Yayoi, Kisaragi, Mutsuki, Mochizuki, Hayate, and Oite, two old Momi-class vessels converted to patrol boats (Patrol Boat No. 32 and Patrol Boat No. 33), and two troop transports containing 450 Japanese Special Naval Landing Forces (SNLF) troops.

The Japanese approached the island early on the morning of 11 December, and the warships began to bombard the island at a range of 8,200 meters (9,000 yd) at 05:30. As none of the six 5-inch (12.7 cm) coast-defense guns replied, Rear Admiral Sadamichi Kajioka, commander of the invasion forces, ordered his ships to close the island, believing that the American guns had been destroyed by the earlier aerial attacks. Encouraging this, Major James Devereux, commander of the United States Marine garrison, had ordered his men to hold their fire until he gave the order to do so. After the Japanese ships had closed to a range of 4,100 meters (4,500 yd), he ordered his guns to open fire. Battery L, based on Peale Islet, engaged their closest target, Hayate, and hit her on the third salvo. After a large explosion aft, she broke in half and sank within two minutes at coordinates 19°16′N 166°37′E, two miles (3 km) southwest of Wake. The location of the explosion makes it probable that the shells struck one of the aft torpedo mounts, or, less likely, the depth charges on the stern. Only one man from the 169 men aboard was rescued. She was the first warship lost by the Japanese during the war. The quick loss of Hayate and the near misses around his flagship, Yūbari, caused Kajioka to order his forces to disengage.
