= Japanese destroyer Mochizuki (1927) =

Destroyer of the Imperial Japanese Navy

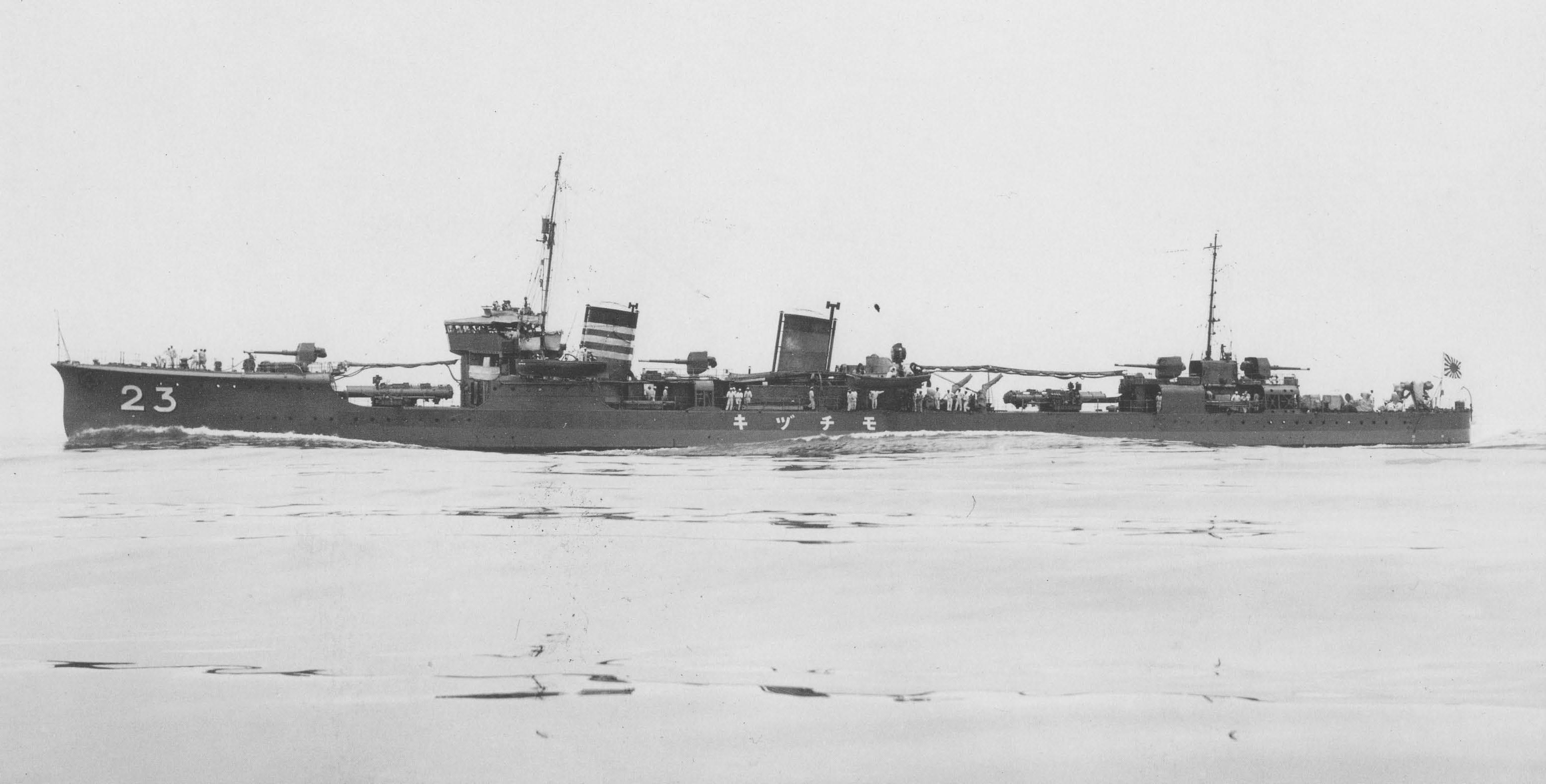
- Mochizuki underway on 17 August 1932

History

Empire of Japan
- Name: Mochizuki
- Namesake: Full moon
- Builder: Uraga Dock Company, Uraga
- Laid down: 23 March 1926 as Destroyer No. 33
- Launched: 28 April 1927
- Completed: 31 October 1927
- Renamed: As Mochizuki 1 August 1928
- Stricken: 5 January 1944
- Fate: Sunk by American aircraft, 24 October 1943

General characteristics
- Type: Mutsuki-class destroyer
- Displacement: 1,336 t (1,315 long tons) (normal); 1,800 t (1,772 long tons) (deep load)
- Length: 97.54 m (320 ft 0 in) (pp); 102.4 m (335 ft 11 in) (o/a)
- Beam: 9.16 m (30 ft 1 in)
- Draft: 2.96 m (9 ft 9 in)
- Installed power: 38,500 shp (28,700 kW); 4 × Kampon water-tube boilers
- Propulsion: 2 shafts; 2 × Kampon geared steam turbines
- Speed: 37.25 knots (68.99 km/h; 42.87 mph)
- Range: 4,000 nmi (7,400 km; 4,600 mi) at 15 knots (28 km/h; 17 mph)
- Complement: 150
- Armament: 4 × 12 cm (4.7 in) Type 3 guns; 2 × triple 61 cm (24 in) torpedo tubes; 18 × depth charges; 16 × mines

Service record
- Part of: Destroyer Division 30
- Operations: Second Sino-Japanese War; Battle of Wake Island; Solomon Islands campaign; New Guinea campaign

The Japanese destroyer Mochizuki (望月, ”Full Moon”) was one of twelve Mutsuki-class destroyers, built for the Imperial Japanese Navy (IJN) during the 1920s. During the Pacific War, she participated in the Battle of Wake Island in December 1941 and the occupations of New Guinea and the Solomon Islands in early 1942.

== Design and description ==
The Mutsuki class was an improved version of the Kamikaze-class destroyers and was the first with triple 61-centimeter (24 in) torpedo tubes. The ships had an overall length of 102.4 meters (335 ft 11 in) and were 94.54 meters (310 ft 2 in) between perpendiculars. They had a beam of 9.16 meters (30 ft 1 in), and a mean draft of 2.96 meters (9 ft 9 in). The Mutsuki-class ships displaced 1,336 metric tons (1,315 long tons) at standard load and 1,800 metric tons (1,772 long tons) at deep load. They were powered by two Parsons geared steam turbines, each driving one propeller shaft, using steam provided by four Kampon water-tube boilers. The turbines were designed to produce 38,500 shaft horsepower (28,700 kW), which would propel the ships at 37.25 knots (68.99 km/h; 42.87 mph). The ships carried 420 metric tons (413 long tons) of fuel oil which gave them a range of 4,000 nautical miles (7,400 km; 4,600 mi) at 15 knots (28 km/h; 17 mph). Their crew consisted of 150 officers and crewmen.

The main armament of the Mutsuki-class ships consisted of four 12-centimeter (4.7 in) Type 3 guns in single mounts; one gun forward of the superstructure, one between the two funnels and the last pair back to back atop the aft superstructure. The guns were numbered '1' to '4' from front to rear. The ships carried two above-water triple sets of 61-centimeter torpedo tubes; one mount was between the forward superstructure and the forward gun and the other was between the aft funnel and aft superstructure. Four reload torpedoes were provided for the tubes. They carried 18 depth charges and could also carry 16 mines. They could also fitted with minesweeping gear.

== Construction and career ==
Mochizuki, built by the Uraga Dock Company at their shipyard in Uraga, was laid down on 23 March 1926, launched on 28 April 1927 and completed on 31 October 1927. Originally commissioned simply as Destroyer No. 33, the ship was assigned the name Mochizuki on 1 August 1928. In the late 1930s, the ship participated in combat in the Second Sino-Japanese War, covering the landings of Japanese troops in central and southern China.

=== Pacific War ===
At the time of the attack on Pearl Harbor on 7 December 1941, Mochizuki was assigned to Destroyer Division 30 under Destroyer Squadron 6 of the 4th Fleet. She sortied from Kwajalein on 8 December as part of the Wake Island invasion force. This consisted of the light cruisers Yūbari, Tenryū, and Tatsuta, the destroyers Yayoi, Hayate, Mutsuki, Kisaragi, Oite, and Mochizuki, two old Momi-class vessels converted to patrol boats (Patrol Boat No. 32 and Patrol Boat No. 33), and two troop transports containing 450 Japanese Special Naval Landing Forces (SNLF) troops.

After taking heavy losses (including Kisaragi and Hayate), the Japanese force withdrew without landing. This was the first Japanese defeat of the war, and also the only occasion in World War II when an amphibious assault was repulsed by shore-based guns. Mochizuki returned on December 23 with the second Wake Island invasion force before sailing back to Kwajalein.

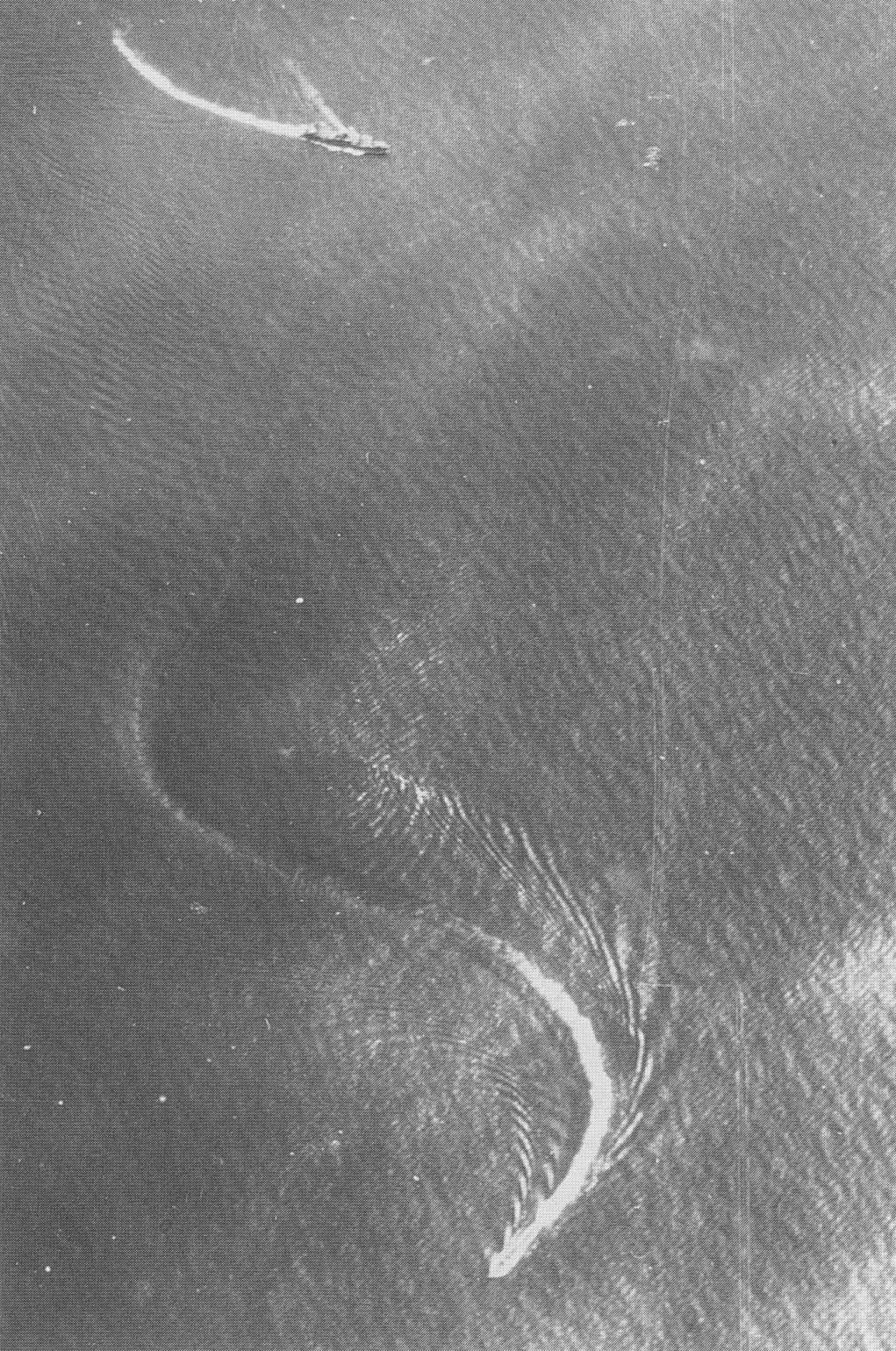
Mochizuki (bottom) and the seaplane tender Kiyokawa Maru (top) maneuver under aerial attack by US Navy aircraft from the aircraft carrier Yorktown during the invasion of Lae-Salamaua on 10 March 1942

The ship escorted a convoy from Kwajalein to the naval base at Truk in January 1942, where a sponson was installed for a pair of license-built 13.2 mm (0.5 in) Type 93 anti-aircraft machineguns on the forward side of the bridge, and then to Guam. From February through March, she participated in the invasion of the Solomon Islands, covering the landings of Japanese forces during Operation R (the invasion of Rabaul, New Ireland and New Britain), and during Operation SR (the invasion of Lae and Salamaua on New Guinea), and in April, covering landings on the Admiralty Islands. During the Battle of the Coral Sea from 7–8 May 1942, Mochizuki was assigned to the Operation Mo invasion force for Port Moresby. After that operation was cancelled, it returned to Truk, escorting airfield construction convoys between Truk, Lae and Guadalcanal until recalled to Japan in mid-July for refitting.

After repairs were completed at Sasebo Naval Arsenal, Mochizuki was reassigned to the IJN 8th Fleet. At the end of September, Mochizuki sortied with the destroyer Isokaze to rescue survivors from the destroyer Yayoi on Normanby Island. On 14–15 October Mochizuki provided cover for the cruisers Kinugasa and Chōkai during a bombardment of Henderson Field. Throughout November, Mochizuki made numerous “Tokyo Express” troop transport runs to Guadalcanal. On one of these runs (8 November), she was hit by a dud torpedo from PT-61. On another run (13–15 November), she assisted Amagiri in rescuing 1500 survivors from the torpedoed Nagara Maru and Canberra Maru transports.

On 1 December 1942, Mochizuki was reassigned to the IJN 8th Fleet. In the remainder of the month, she served as escort to the cruisers Kumano and Suzuya in the Admiralty Islands operations, and landings of troops at Buna and Finschhafen in New Guinea. Mochizuki came under air attack on several occasions, suffering minor damage.

After making two Tokyo Express runs from Rabaul to Kolombangara and Rekata Bay in January 1943, Mochizuki returned to Sasebo for repairs. She returned to Rabaul at the end of March, assisting the torpedoed Florida Maru along the way. Through the end of June 1943, Mochizuki was used as a Tokyo Express transport to Rekata, Buna, Tuluvu and Kolombangara. During the Battle of Kula Gulf on 5–6 July, Mochizuki engaged the destroyers USS Radford and USS Nicholas, taking minor damage from shell hits on her No. 1 gun turret and torpedo tubes. The damage was severe enough to warrant a return to Sasebo to the end of August. After returning to Rabaul at the end of September, Mochizuki resumed Tokyo Express operations.

During one such operation, on 24 October 1943 while en route from Rabaul to Jacquinot Bay (New Britain) Mochizuki came under attack by U.S. Navy PBY Catalinas, 90 mi (140 km) south-southwest of Rabaul 5°42′S 151°40′E, sinking after a direct bomb hit into engineering. Most of the crew were rescued by her sister ship Uzuki. The ship was struck from the Navy List on 5 January 1944.
