= Hainan Island Operation =

Japanese campaign in the Second Sino-Japanese War

- Part of the Second Sino-Japanese War and the interwar period
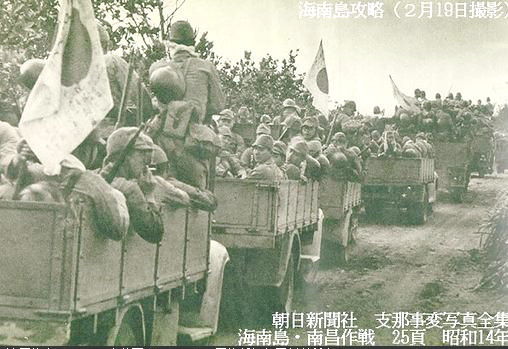
- Imperial Japanese Army soldiers in trucks during the invasion of Hainan (Asahi Shinbun news photo)
Date	9 February 1939 – 11 February 1939 (2 days)
Location	Hainan in the Republic of China
Result	Japanese victory
Territorial changes	Japanese occupation of Hainan

Belligerents
Empire of Japan	(Republic of China (1912–1949)) Republic of China

Commanders and leaders
(Empire of Japan) Nobutake Kondō	(Republic of China (1912–1949)) Yu Hanmou

Units involved
Imperial Japanese Navy	National Revolutionary Army Ground Forces: 11th and 15th security regiments 1st, 2nd, 3rd, 4th, 6th, and 7th guard battalions An independent unit of the self-defense corps

Strength
Elements of IJN 5th Fleet; Iida Task Force : 419 officers and 1,533 (including 891 auxiliaries) warrant officers, NCOs, and soldiers	11th security regiment : 104 officers and 1,557 soldiers Other units : unknown.

Casualties and losses
Iida Task Force : 5 killed, 2 wounded.	3,000 killed Iida Task Force's Claim : 596 killed, 89 POWs Chinese claim from 10 January until 9 May 1939 : 11th security regiment : 8 officers and 162 soldiers killed 3 officers and 16 soldiers wounded 5 officers and 68 soldiers missing Other units : unknown

The Hainan Island Operation (Chinese: 瓊崖戰役), or Kainan-tō sakusen (海南島作戦) in Japanese, was part of a campaign by the Empire of Japan during the Second World War to blockade the Guangdong mainland and prevent it from communicating with the outside world and from receiving imports of much-needed arms and materials.

== Background ==
Hainan Island lies midway between French Indochina and British Hong Kong, occupying a position south of the Leizhou Peninsula across the Strait of Hainan. It is also near Kwangchowan, a French-leased territory on the southern coast of China. The Hainan Island has an area of 33,920 square kilometres (13,100 sq mi), and had a population of 2,200,000 at the time. The island was guarded by two security regiments, six guard battalions, and a self-defense corps, under the command of Yu Hanmou, who was in charge of peace preservation in Guangdong Province.

The Japanese Navy, after the capture of Canton (Guangzhou) the previous year, had maintained a formidable blockade all along the coast of south, central and north China. However, loopholes were found in the southern end of the blockade line. These included the supply route to Chiang Kai-shek with Hong Kong and Northern French Indochina as relay points and direct routes through Hainan Island and Kwangchowan. Because of these loopholes, as well as the necessity to conduct air operations deep into the interior of China, as far as the Kunming area, the Japanese Navy came to feel the necessity of establishing air bases on Hainan Island. The Central Authorities of the Navy advocated for this move. Operations were carried out by the Special Naval Landing Forces with Army elements supporting them.

== Operation ==
Escorting a convoy, the South China Naval Force (Fifth Fleet) commanded by Vice Admiral Nobutake Kondō entered and anchored in Tsinghai Bay on the northern shore of Hainan Island at midnight on 9 February 1939 and carried out a successful landing. In addition, Navy land combat units effected a landing at Haikou at 12:00 on 10 February. Thereafter, the Army and Navy forces acted in concert to mop up the northern zone. On 11 February, land combat units landed at Samah (Sanya) at the southern extremity of Hainan Island and occupied the key positions of Yulin and Yai-Hsien. Thereafter, the units engaged in the occupation and subjugation of the entire island.

== Retreat to Wuzhi mountain range ==
Facing crisis, Nationalist forces evacuated all remaining civilians from Haikou to Qionghai to the safe Wuzhi mountain range in central Hainan.

The Communists under Feng Baiju and the native Li people of Hainan fought a vigorous guerrilla campaign against the Japanese occupation, the Japanese killed large numbers of Li in western Hainan (e.g. Sanya, Danzhou). Furthermore, numerous foreign slave labourers were also killed. Of the 100,000 slave labourers from Hong Kong, only 20,000 survived the war.

== Japanese atrocities against ethnic and religious minorities ==
The Nanding mass grave in Hainan was filled with 1,800 Korean forced labourers who were slaughtered by the Japanese right before their surrender. The Japanese brought the Koreans to Nanding village after the US bombed the Japanese in Sanya in 1944. Taiwanese in Changganya and 11 Taiwanese at Tiandu Iron mine including Qiu Ronghua defected to Chinese forces in February 1944.

Japanese destroyed more than 350 Muslim houses and mosques when building the Sanya airport in Hainan. The Japanese committed the Sanya airport massacre when destroying houses of locals and expellling them including houses of Muslims around Sanya like at Sanya street, Fan village and Sanya village, in order to build an airport.

One of the mosques on Hainan in Huihui village that was destroyed by Japan in 1939 had a hall that could fit 100 people with four entrances on the gates and the main gate had 4 doors, with a beam and 4 pillars with Qur'anic verses in the main hall in addition to two dragons, it dated to the beginning of the southern Song. The Japanese demolished and bombed another mosque in Sanya that dated from the Ming dynasty and they drove the Muslims out of Yanglan when building the Suo-Sanya-Li airport.

Li villages in Baoting Li and Miao Autonomous County were plundered for rice by Japanese and Li girls had to sift through it for the Japanese while being raped by Japanese, one of the 16 year old Li girls who was taken for rape and forced labour was Wu Yaodong (b. July 1925).

Japan massacred over 100,000 Miao and Li civilians in a "Three Alls" campaign in Hainan. They forced all ethnicities to engaged in forced labour and destroyed 50,000 villages and homes.

== Partial occupation of Hainan ==
Later, Japanese-occupied parts of Hainan Island became a naval administrative district with Hainan Guard District Headquarters established at Samah. Strategically, the island was built as a forward air base as well as an advance base for blockading Chiang. At the same time, the iron and copper resources of the island were exploited. Partial control of certain areas of Hainan Island provided a base of operations for the invasion of Guangdong province and French Indochina, as well as providing airbases that permitted long-distance air raids of routes into China from French Indochina and Burma.

Chinese Nationalist guerrilla forces continued to be active in Hainan Island. In mid-May 1939, the Taiwan Mixed Brigade launched a mopping-up operation against Wang Yi's troops consisting of the 11th and 15th Peace Preservation Regiments along with conscript and guard units in Lingmen and Nanlu, claiming 432 abandoned enemy corpses and 31 POWs while suffering 6 wounded.

The occupation of some parts of Hainan lasted until the surrender of Japan in September 1945.

From February 10, 1939 to December 31, 1942, the Japanese Hainan Guard District reported engaging in 16,390 actions and claimed 28,863 abandoned enemy corpses, 3,018 POWs, and 3,333 surrendered enemies while suffering 465 killed and 593 wounded.

== See also ==
- Order of Battle: Hainan Island Operation
