= Uraga Dock Company =

Japanese shipyard

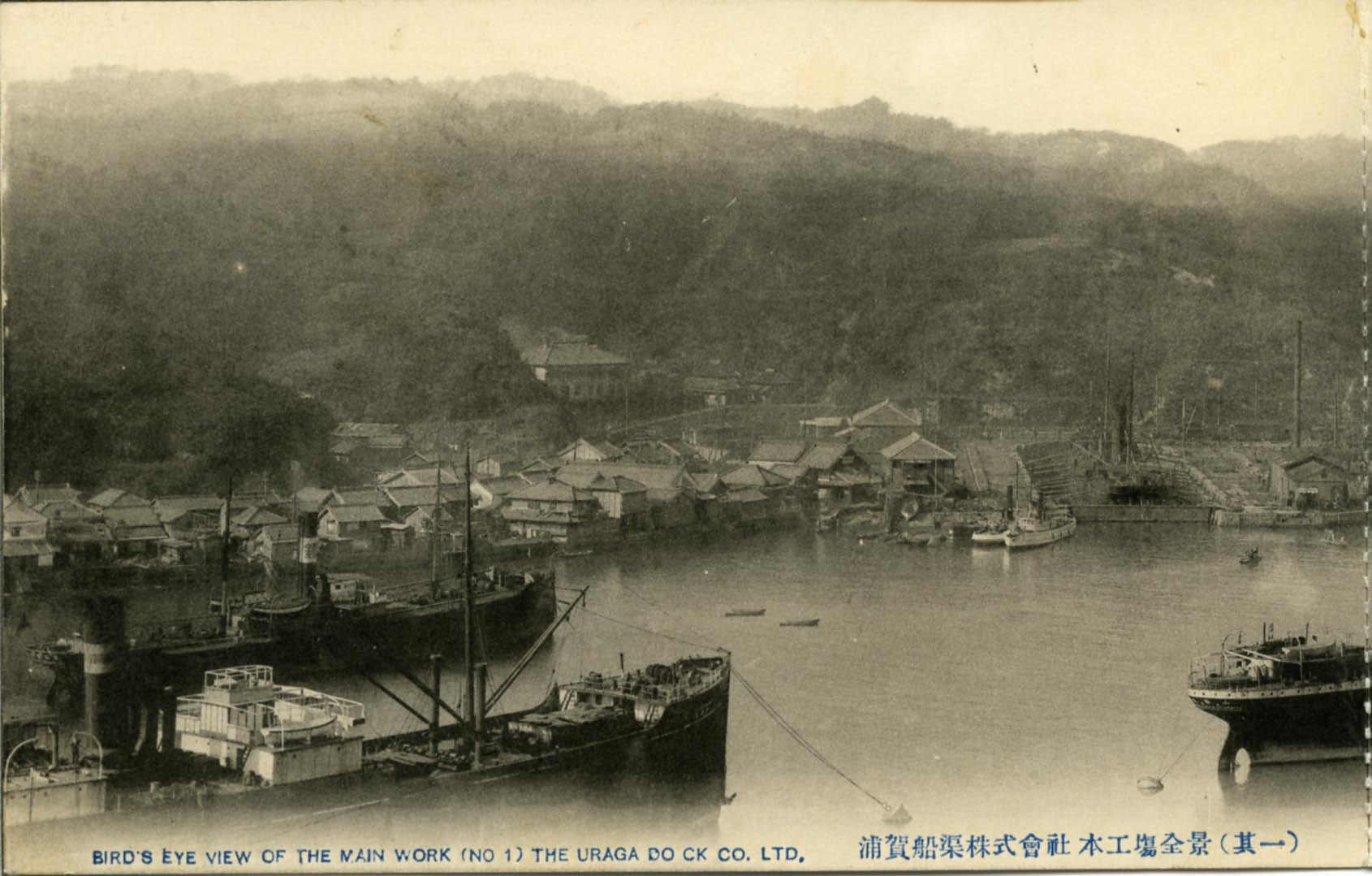
Uraga Dock Company in 1910 postcard

Uraga Dock Company (浦賀船渠株式会社, Uraga Senkyo Kabushiki Kaisha) was a major privately owned shipyard in Uraga, Japan, which built numerous warships for the Imperial Japanese Navy.

== History ==
Uraga Dock Company was founded by Enomoto Takeaki in 1869. A shipyard had already existed in Uraga from the end of the Edo period. When Commodore Perry's flagship anchored off Uraga in 1854, one of the officials of the Tokugawa shogunate who boarded the American vessel was a trained shipwright, Nakajima Saburosuke. His observation of the ship's interior enabled him to deduce the details of its design and construction, and after the departure of Perry back to the United States, the government ordered him to start construction of a three-masted barque, called the Hōō maru. He subsequently participated in the repair of the Dutch-built Kanrin maru, during which time he constructed the first dry dock built in Japan in 1859. However, the Tokugawa government decided to establish its own shipyards at nearby Yokosuka, and the Uraga facilities went out of business in 1876.

Nakajima died during the Boshin War of the Meiji restoration fighting on the Tokugawa side. After the establishment of the Meiji government, his former colleagues Enomoto Takeaki and Arai Ikunosuke gained important positions in the new administration, and supported the establishment of a modern shipyard on the foundation established by Nakajima. The new facility was inaugurated in 1897, and faced an immediate crisis when Tokyo-based Ishikawajima Harima opened a rival facility the following year and started to dump prices in an effort to destroy its competition. Uraga Dock Company managed to buy out Ishikawajima in 1902.

In 1906, Uraga Dock Company launched its first destroyer for the Imperial Japanese Navy, the Nagatsuki. Over its subsequent history, the dockyards at Uraga constructed over 1000 vessels, including ferries, passenger liners, training vessels, and warships of various sizes. Numerous vessels were also produced for the export market.

By 1919, Uraga Dock Company was considered one of the largest and best equipped private shipyards in the world. Subsidiary companies were established in Yokkaichi, Mie and in Qingdao.

Uraga Dock Company was also characterized by its organized labor force, one of the earliest in Japan, which went on strike in 1905–1907, 1910–1911, and in 1915.

In post war Japan, Uraga Dock Company was acquired by the Sumitomo group in 1969. It was modernized extensively on several occasions, but increasing competitive pressures from overseas ship builders forced Sumitomo to close down operations in 2003.

== Ships built ==
(dates are launch dates)

- Light cruisers
  - 2 of 6 Nagara-class
    - Isuzu (29 October 1921)
    - Abukuma (16 March 1923)
- Destroyers
  - 2 of 32 Kamikaze-class
    - Nagatsuki (15 December 1906)
    - Kikutsuki (10 April 1907)
  - 0 of 2 Umikaze-class
  - 0 of 2 Sakura-class
  - 0 of 2 Urakaze-class
  - 1 of 10 Kaba-class
    - Kiri (28 February 1915)
  - 0 of 4 Isokaze-class
  - 0 of 4 Momo-class
  - 4 of 21 Momi-class
    - Kaki (20 October 1919)
    - Hagi (29 October 1920)
    - Hishi (9 May 1921)
    - Hasu (8 December 1921)
  - 0 of 15 Minekaze-class
  - 2 of 8 Wakatake-class
    - Sanae (15 February 1923)
    - Sawarabi (1 November 1923)
  - 1 of 9 Kamikaze-class
    - Oite (27 November 1924)
  - 3 of 12 Mutsuki-class
    - Yayoi (11 July 1925)
    - Minazuki (25 May 1926)
    - Mochizuki (28 April 1927)
  - 5 of 24 Fubuki-class
    - Miyuki (26 June 1928)
    - Isonami (24 November 1927)
    - Sagiri (23 December 1929)
    - Ushio (17 November 1930)
    - Ikazuchi (22 October 1931)
  - 2 of 6 Hatsuharu-class
    - Nenohi (22 December 1932)
    - Hatsushimo (4 November 1933)
  - 4 of 10 Shiratsuyu-class
    - Shigure (18 May 1935)
    - Samidare (6 July 1935)
    - Yamakaze (21 February 1936)
    - Suzukaze (11 March 1937)
  - 1 of 10 Asashio-class
    - Kasumi (18 November 1937)
  - 6 of 19 Kagero-class
    - Shiranui (28 June 1938)
    - Hayashio (19 April 1939)
    - Tokitsukaze (10 November 1939)
    - Hamakaze (25 November 1940)
    - Hagikaze (18 June 1940)
    - Akigumo (11 April 1941)
  - 6 of 19 Yugumo-class
    - Kazagumo (26 September 1941)
    - Takanami (16 March 1942)
    - Kiyonami (17 August 1942)
    - Suzunami (26 December 1942)
    - Kishinami (19 August 1943)
    - Kiyoshimo (29 February 1944)
  - 1 of 12 Akizuki-class
    - Yoizuki (25 September 1944)
