= Japanese destroyer Mikazuki (1926) =

WWII Japanese warship

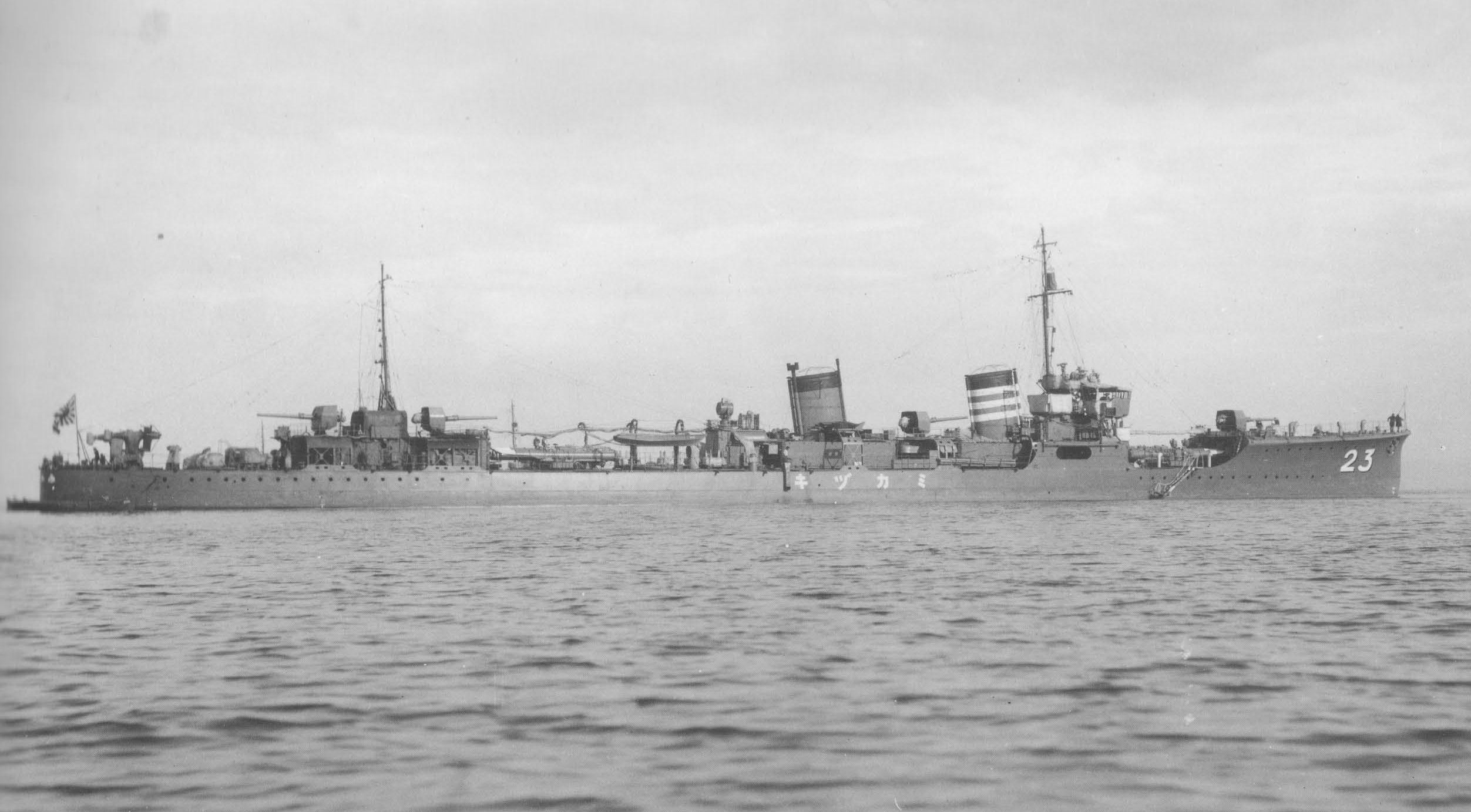
- Mikazuki on 8 March 1933

History

Empire of Japan
- Name: Mikazuki
- Namesake: Crescent moon
- Builder: Sasebo Naval Arsenal, Sasebo
- Laid down: 21 August 1925 as Destroyer No. 32
- Launched: 12 July 1926
- Completed: 5 May 1927
- Renamed: As Mikazuki, 1 August 1928
- Stricken: 15 October 1943
- Fate: Sunk by American aircraft, 28 July 1943

General characteristics
- Type: Mutsuki-class destroyer
- Displacement: 1,336 t (1,315 long tons) (normal); 1,800 t (1,772 long tons) (deep load)
- Length: 97.54 m (320 ft 0 in) (pp); 102.4 m (335 ft 11 in) (o/a)
- Beam: 9.16 m (30 ft 1 in)
- Draft: 2.96 m (9 ft 9 in)
- Installed power: 38,500 shp (28,700 kW); 4 × Kampon water-tube boilers
- Propulsion: 2 shafts; 2 × Kampon geared steam turbines
- Speed: 37.25 knots (68.99 km/h; 42.87 mph)
- Range: 4,000 nmi (7,400 km; 4,600 mi) at 15 knots (28 km/h; 17 mph)
- Complement: 150
- Armament: 4 × 12 cm (4.7 in) Type 3 guns; 2 × triple 61 cm (24 in) torpedo tubes; 18 × depth charges; 16 × mines

Service record
- Part of: Destroyer Division 30
- Operations: Battle of Midway; Solomon Islands campaign

The Japanese destroyer Mikazuki (三日月, ”Crescent Moon”) was one of twelve Mutsuki-class destroyers, built for the Imperial Japanese Navy (IJN) during the 1920s. At the beginning of the Pacific War, she served in home waters as the plane guard for those aircraft carriers that were training or working up. In mid-1942, the ship played a minor role in the Battle of Midway and was then assigned to convoy escort duties between Formosa and Japan for the next year. Mikazuki was then transferred to the Solomon Islands in mid-1943 and was destroyed by American bombers after running aground.

== Design and description ==
The Mutsuki class was an improved version of the Kamikaze-class destroyers and was the first with triple 61-centimeter (24 in) torpedo tubes. The ships had an overall length of 102.4 meters (335 ft 11 in) and were 94.54 meters (310 ft 2 in) between perpendiculars. They had a beam of 9.16 meters (30 ft 1 in), and a mean draft of 2.96 meters (9 ft 9 in). The Mutsuki-class ships displaced 1,336 metric tons (1,315 long tons) at standard load and 1,800 metric tons (1,772 long tons) at deep load. They were powered by two Parsons geared steam turbines, each driving one propeller shaft, using steam provided by four Kampon water-tube boilers. The turbines were designed to produce 38,500 shaft horsepower (28,700 kW), which would propel the ships at 37.25 knots (68.99 km/h; 42.87 mph). The ships carried 420 metric tons (413 long tons) of fuel oil which gave them a range of 4,000 nautical miles (7,400 km; 4,600 mi) at 15 knots (28 km/h; 17 mph). Their crew consisted of 150 officers and crewmen.

The main armament of the Mutsuki-class ships consisted of four 12-centimeter (4.7 in) Type 3 guns in single mounts; one gun forward of the superstructure, one between the two funnels and the last pair back to back atop the aft superstructure. The guns were numbered '1' to '4' from front to rear. The ships carried two above-water triple sets of 61-centimeter torpedo tubes; one mount was between the forward superstructure and the forward gun and the other was between the aft funnel and aft superstructure. Four reload torpedoes were provided for the tubes. They carried 18 depth charges and could also carry 16 mines. They could also fitted with minesweeping gear.

Mikazuki was one of six Mutsuki-class ships reconstructed in 1935–36, with their hulls strengthened, raked caps fitted to the funnels and shields to the torpedo mounts. In 1941–42, most of those ships were converted into fast transports with No. 2 and No. 3 guns removed. In addition, ten license-built 25 mm (1.0 in) Type 96 light AA guns and at least two 13.2 mm (0.5 in) Type 93 anti-aircraft machineguns were installed. The minesweeping gear was replaced by four depth charge throwers and the ships now carried a total of 36 depth charges. These changes reduced their speed to 34 knots (63 km/h; 39 mph) and increased their displacement to 1,944 metric tons (1,913 long tons) at normal load. Three more 25 mm guns were added in 1942–43. (Note: Nevitt significantly differs from the other, more generic, accounts about these conversions. He states that Mikazuki was the only ship of her class to have some of her aft boilers removed in early 1943. In addition, her aft torpedo mount and Nos. 2 and 4 guns were replaced by additional 13.2 and 25 mm AA guns.)

== Construction and career ==
Mikazuki, built at the Sasebo Naval Arsenal, was laid down on 21 August 1925, launched on 12 July 1926 and completed on 5 May 1927. Originally commissioned simply as Destroyer No. 32, the ship was assigned the name Mikazuki on 1 August 1928. In the late 1930s, she participated in combat during the Second Sino-Japanese War, covering the landings of Japanese troops in central and southern China.

=== Pacific War ===
At the time of the attack on Pearl Harbor, Mikazuki was part of Carrier Division 3 under the IJN 1st Fleet, and based in Japanese home waters as escort to the aircraft carriers Hōshō and Zuihō.

During the Battle of Midway on 4–5 June 1942, Mikazuki sortied as part of the escort for Zuihō with Admiral Nobutake Kondō's occupation force, and was thus not involved in combat during that battle. Afterwards, Mikazuki was reassigned to the Southwest Area Fleet.

From July 1942 to March 1943, Mikazuki escorted convoys between Moji, Kyūshū and Taiwan. From the end of March to 10 June 1943, Mikazuki underwent refit at the Sasebo Naval Arsenal, after which she was reassigned to Destroyer Division 30 of Desron 3, in the IJN 8th Fleet based out of Rabaul.

From the end of June 1943 to July 1943, Mikazuki was used primarily as a Tokyo Express high speed transport to convey troops and supplies to Kolombangara. She participated in the Battle of Kula Gulf on 5–6 July during which she landed Special Naval Landing Forces under fire. Mikazuki also provided cover during the Battle of Kolombangara on 12 July.

On 27 July 1943, Mikazuki grounded on a reef while on a troop transport mission to Tuluvu, New Britain 5°27′S 148°25′E. The following morning, she was attacked and destroyed by USAAF B-25 Mitchell bombers, losing eight crewmen. Mikazuki was struck from the navy list on 15 October 1943.
