= Japanese destroyer Mutsuki =

Destroyer of the Imperial Japanese Navy

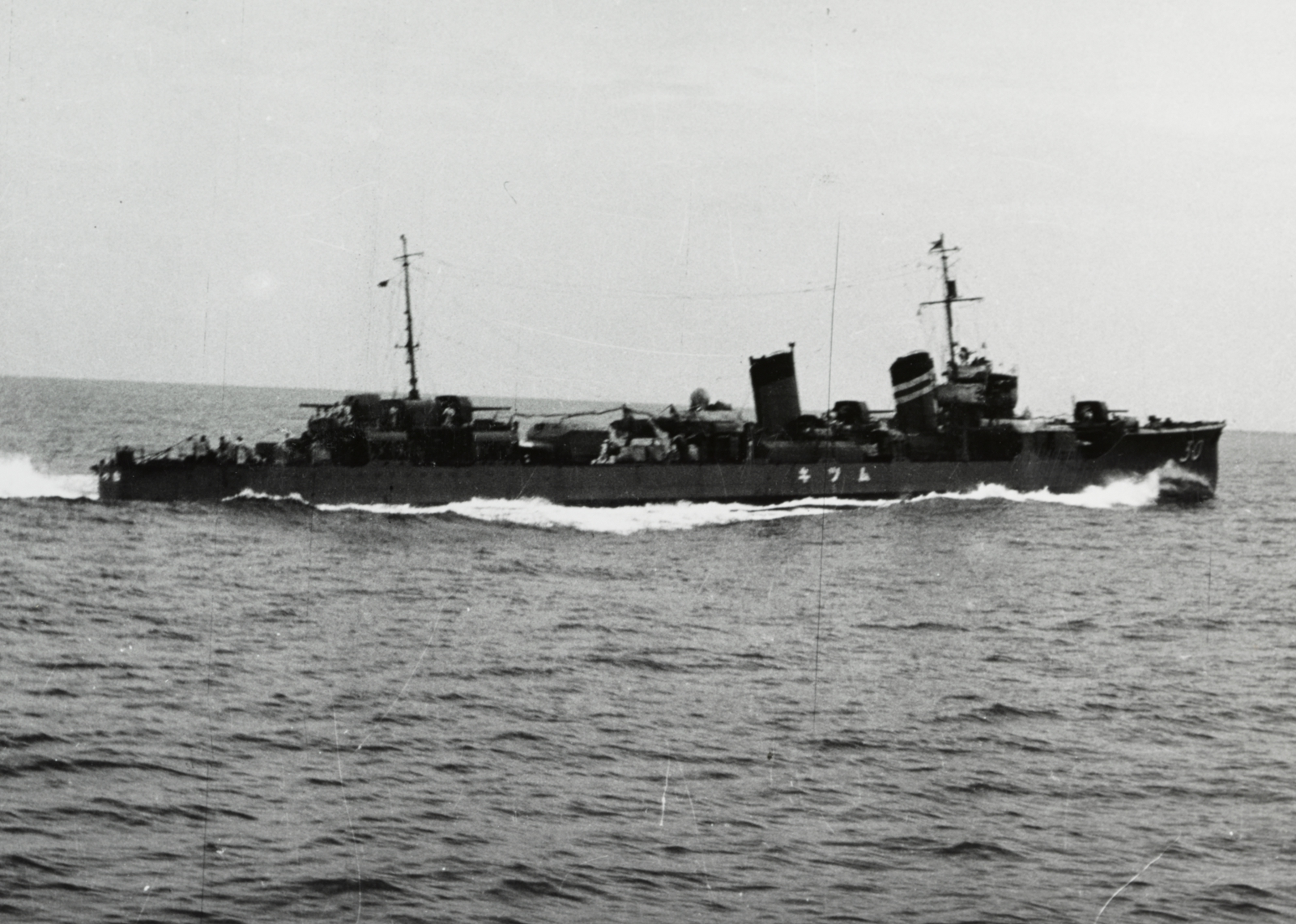
- Mutsuki at sea

History

Empire of Japan
- Name: Mutsuki
- Namesake: January
- Builder: Sasebo Naval Arsenal
- Laid down: 21 May 1924 as Destroyer No. 19
- Launched: 23 July 1925
- Completed: 25 March 1926
- Renamed: As Mutsuki, 1 August 1928
- Stricken: 1 October 1942
- Fate: Sunk by American bombers, 25 August 1942

General characteristics
- Class & type: Mutsuki-class destroyer
- Displacement: 1,336 t (1,315 long tons) (normal); 1,800 t (1,772 long tons) (deep load)
- Length: 97.54 m (320 ft 0 in) (pp); 102.4 m (335 ft 11 in) (o/a)
- Beam: 9.16 m (30 ft 1 in)
- Draft: 2.96 m (9 ft 9 in)
- Installed power: 38,500 shp (28,700 kW); 4 × Kampon water-tube boilers
- Propulsion: 2 shafts; 2 × Kampon geared steam turbines
- Speed: 37.25 knots (68.99 km/h; 42.87 mph)
- Range: 4,000 nmi (7,400 km; 4,600 mi) at 15 knots (28 km/h; 17 mph)
- Complement: 150
- Armament: 4 × 12 cm (4.7 in) Type 3 guns; 2 × triple 61 cm (24 in) torpedo tubes; 18 × depth charges; 16 × mines

Service record
- Part of: Destroyer Division 30
- Operations: Battle of Wake Island; Solomon Islands campaign

The Japanese destroyer Mutsuki (睦月, "January") was the name ship of her class of twelve destroyers built for the Imperial Japanese Navy (IJN) during the 1920s. During the Pacific War, she participated in the Battle of Wake Island in December 1941 and the occupations of New Guinea and the Solomon Islands in early 1942. Mutsuki was one of the escorts for the invasion force during the Battle of the Coral Sea in May and then participated in the Guadalcanal Campaign later that year. The ship was sunk by American bombers during the Battle of the Eastern Solomons in August.

== Design and description ==
The Mutsuki class was an improved version of the Kamikaze-class destroyers and was the first with triple 61-centimeter (24 in) torpedo tubes. The ships had an overall length of 102.4 meters (335 ft 11 in) and were 94.54 meters (310 ft 2 in) between perpendiculars. They had a beam of 9.16 meters (30 ft 1 in), and a mean draft of 2.96 meters (9 ft 9 in). The Mutsuki-class ships displaced 1,336 metric tons (1,315 long tons) at standard load and 1,800 metric tons (1,772 long tons) at deep load. They were powered by two Parsons geared steam turbines, each driving one propeller shaft, using steam provided by four Kampon water-tube boilers. The turbines were designed to produce 38,500 shaft horsepower (28,700 kW), which would propel the ships at 37.25 knots (68.99 km/h; 42.87 mph). The ships carried 420 metric tons (413 long tons) of fuel oil which gave them a range of 4,000 nautical miles (7,400 km; 4,600 mi) at 15 knots (28 km/h; 17 mph). Their crew consisted of 150 officers and crewmen.

The main armament of the Mutsuki-class ships consisted of four 12-centimeter (4.7 in) Type 3 guns in single mounts; one gun forward of the superstructure, one between the two funnels and the last pair back to back atop the aft superstructure. The guns were numbered '1' to '4' from front to rear. The ships carried two above-water triple sets of 61-centimeter torpedo tubes; one mount was between the forward superstructure and the forward gun and the other was between the aft funnel and aft superstructure. Four reload torpedoes were provided for the tubes. They carried 18 depth charges and could also carry 16 mines. They could also fitted with minesweeping gear.

== Construction and career ==
Mutsuki, built at the Sasebo Naval Arsenal, was laid down on 21 May 1924, launched on 23 July 1925 and completed on 26 March 1926. Originally commissioned simply as Destroyer No. 19, she was assigned the name Mutsuki on 1 August 1928. In the late 1930s, Mutsuki participated in combat in China, including the First Shanghai Incident of 1932 and other actions in the Second Sino-Japanese War.

=== Pacific War ===
At the time of the attack on Pearl Harbor on 7 December 1941, Mutsuki was the flagship of Destroyer Division 30 under Destroyer Squadron 6 of the 4th Fleet. She sortied from Kwajalein on 8 December as part of the Wake Island invasion force, carrying an advance landing party of the Japanese Special Naval Landing Forces (SNLF). Early on the morning of 11 December, the American garrison repulsed the first landing attempts by the SNLF, which was supported by the light cruisers Yūbari, Tenryū, and Tatsuta and the destroyers Yayoi, Hayate, Kisaragi, Mutsuki, Oite, and Mochizuki, two old Momi-class vessels converted to patrol boats (Patrol Boat No. 32 and Patrol Boat No. 33), and two troop transports containing 450 SNLF troops. After taking heavy losses (including Kisaragi and Hayate), the Japanese force withdrew before landing. This was the first Japanese defeat of the war, and also the only occasion in World War II when an amphibious assault was repulsed by shore-based guns. Mutsuki returned on 23 December with the second Wake Island invasion force, and again carried a SNLF advance landing party before returning to Kwajalein.

The ship escorted a convoy from Kwajalein to the naval base at Truk in January 1942, where a sponson was installed for a pair of license-built 13.2 mm (0.5 in) Type 93 anti-aircraft machineguns on the forward side of the bridge. Mutsuki then escorted a troop convoy from Truk to Guam later that month, and then joined the invasion of the Solomon Islands, covering the landings of Japanese forces during Operation R (the invasion of Rabaul, New Ireland and New Britain), and during Operation SR (the invasion of Lae and Salamaua on New Guinea) in January–March. From 28 March to 1 April, she served as the flagship for Rear Admiral Masao Kanazawa, commander of the 8th Special Base Force during the initial occupation of the Shortland Islands and Bougainville in the Solomon Islands. Later that month, the ship supported the occupation of the Admiralty Islands.

During the Battle of the Coral Sea from 7–8 May 1942, Mutsuki was assigned to the Operation Mo invasion force for Port Moresby. After that operation was cancelled, Mutsuki remained based out of Rabaul, escorting shipping between Truk, Rabaul and Palau until recalled to Japan in July for a brief refit.

After repairs were completed at Sasebo Naval Arsenal on 12 July 1942, Mutsuki was reassigned to the IJN 8th Fleet and participated in the bombardment of Henderson Field on 24 August 1942. During the Battle of the Eastern Solomons on 25 August 1942, Mutsuki was sunk in an attack by USAAF B-17 Flying Fortress bombers while assisting the damaged transport Kinryu Maru, 40 miles (64 km) northeast of Santa Isabel island. 7°47′S 160°13′E Mutsuki took a direct bomb hit in her engineering section, killing 41 crewmen and injuring 11 more. Yayoi took on the survivors, which included her captain, Lt. Cdr. Kenji Hatano.

Mutsuki was struck from the Navy List on 1 October 1942.
