= Japanese destroyer Asanagi =

Destroyer of the Imperial Japanese Navy

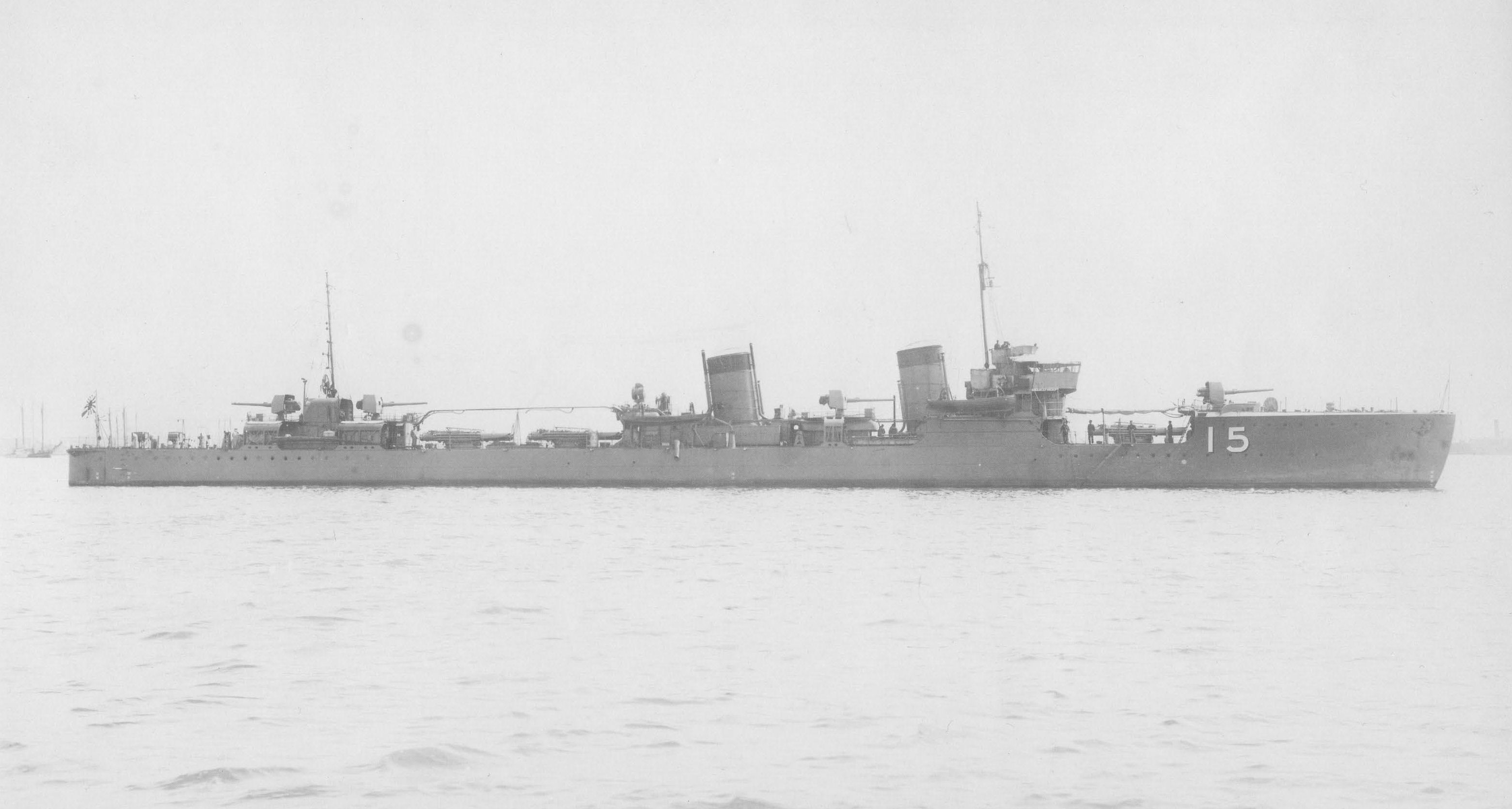
- Asanagi at anchor 29 December 1924

History

Empire of Japan
- Name: Asanagi
- Builder: Fujinagata Shipyards
- Laid down: 5 March 1923 as Destroyer No. 15
- Launched: 21 April 1924
- Completed: 29 December 1924
- Renamed: Asanagi, 1 August 1928
- Stricken: 10 July 1944
- Fate: Sunk on 22 May 1944

General characteristics
- Class & type: Kamikaze-class destroyer
- Displacement: 1,422 t (1,400 long tons) (normal); 1,747 t (1,719 long tons) (deep load)
- Length: 97.5 m (319 ft 11 in) (pp); 102.5 m (336 ft 3 in) (o/a)
- Beam: 9.1 m (29 ft 10 in)
- Draft: 2.9 m (9 ft 6 in)
- Installed power: 38,500 shp (28,700 kW); 4 × Kampon water-tube boilers
- Propulsion: 2 shafts; 2 × Kampon geared steam turbines
- Speed: 37.3 knots (69.1 km/h; 42.9 mph)
- Range: 3,600 nmi (6,700 km; 4,100 mi) at 14 knots (26 km/h; 16 mph)
- Complement: 148
- Armament: 4 × single 12 cm (4.7 in) Type 3 guns; 3 × twin 53.3 cm (21.0 in) torpedo tubes

Service record
- Operations: Battle of Wake Island; New Guinea Campaign; Solomon Islands Campaign

The Japanese destroyer Asanagi (朝凪, "Morning Calm") was one of nine Kamikaze-class destroyers built for the Imperial Japanese Navy (IJN) during the 1920s. During the Pacific War, she participated in the occupation of the Gilbert Islands and the Battle of Wake Island in December 1941 and then the occupations of New Guinea and the Solomon Islands in early 1942.

== Design and description ==
The Kamikaze class was an improved version of the Minekaze-class destroyers. The ships had an overall length of 102.5 meters (336 ft 3 in) and were 97.5 meters (319 ft 11 in) between perpendiculars. They had a beam of 9.1 meters (29 ft 10 in), and a mean draft of 2.9 meters (9 ft 6 in). The Kamikaze-class ships displaced 1,422 metric tons (1,400 long tons) at standard load and 1,747 metric tons (1,719 long tons) at deep load. They were powered by two Parsons geared steam turbines, each driving one propeller shaft, using steam provided by four Kampon water-tube boilers. The turbines were designed to produce 38,500 shaft horsepower (28,700 kW), which would propel the ships at 37.3 knots (69.1 km/h; 42.9 mph). During sea trials, the ships comfortably exceeded their designed speeds, reaching 38.7 to 39.2 knots (71.7 to 72.6 km/h; 44.5 to 45.1 mph). The ships carried 420 metric tons (413 long tons) of fuel oil which gave them a range of 3,600 nautical miles (6,700 km; 4,100 mi) at 14 knots (26 km/h; 16 mph). Their crew consisted of 148 officers and crewmen.

The main armament of the Kamikaze-class ships consisted of four 12-centimeter (4.7 in) Type 3 guns in single mounts; one gun forward of the superstructure, one between the two funnels and the last pair back to back atop the aft superstructure. The guns were numbered '1' to '4' from front to rear. The ships carried three above-water twin sets of 53.3-centimeter (21.0 in) torpedo tubes; one mount was between the forward superstructure and the forward gun and the other two were between the aft funnel and aft superstructure.

Early in the war, the No. 4 gun and the aft torpedo tubes were removed in exchange for four depth charge throwers and 18 depth charges. In addition 10 license-built 25 mm (0.98 in) Type 96 light AA guns were installed. These changes increased their displacement to 1,499 long tons (1,523 t). Survivors had their light AA armament augmented to be between thirteen and twenty 25 mm guns and four 13.2 mm (0.5 in) Type 93 anti-aircraft machineguns by June 1944. These changes reduced their speed to 35 knots (65 km/h; 40 mph).

== Construction and career ==
Asanagi, built at the Fujinagata Shipyards in Osaka, was laid down on 5 March 1923, launched on 21 April 1924 and completed on 29 December 1924. Originally commissioned as Destroyer No. 15, the ship was assigned the name Asanagi on 1 August 1928.

=== Pacific War ===
At the time of the attack on Pearl Harbor on 7 December 1941, Asanagi was assigned to Destroyer Division 29 of Destroyer Squadron 6 of the 4th Fleet, based at Truk. The destroyer provided cover for the Gilbert Islands invasion force from 8–10 December 1941, and subsequently was assigned to the second Wake Island invasion force on December 23.

From January through March 1942, Asanagi provided cover for landings of Japanese forces during Operation R (the invasion of Rabaul, New Britain) and Operation SR, (the invasion of Lae and Salamaua). While patrolling out of Lae on 10 March, she suffered medium damage from strafing attacks, forcing a return to Sasebo for repairs by April. Once repairs were completed in June, Asanagi escorted convoys from Sasebo back to Truk. During the Battle of the Coral Sea from 7–8 May 1942, Asanagi was assigned to the Operation Mo invasion force for Port Moresby on New Guinea. When that operation was cancelled, she returned to Sasebo for further repairs.

Asanagi returned to Rabaul in mid-July and was assigned to cover Japanese landings on Buna. While making troop landings at Buna, Asanagi suffered damage by grounding on a coral reef while maneuvering to escape an air raid, and was forced to return to Yokosuka for repairs. She spent the remainder of September through November 1943 on patrols and escort duty in the central Pacific, and between Truk, Rabaul and the Japanese home islands.

In 1944, Asanagi escorted numerous convoys between Yokosuka, Truk, the Ogasawara Islands and the Mariana Islands. On her return from Saipan to Japan on 20 May 1944, the destroyer was torpedoed and sunk 200 miles (320 km) west-northwest of Chichijima in the Ogasawara Islands at coordinates 28°20′N 138°57′E by the submarine USS Pollack. Asanagi was struck from the navy list on 10 July 1944.
