= Mutsuki-class destroyer =

Imperial Japanese Navy destroyer class

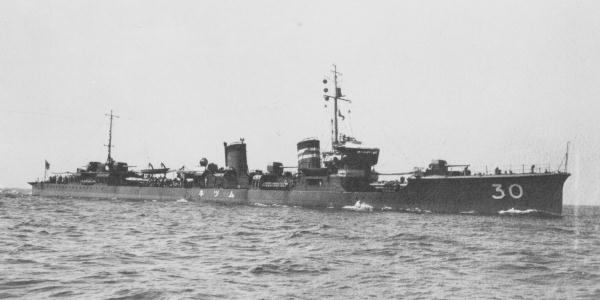
- Mutsuki in 1930

Class overview
- Name: Mutsuki class
- Builders: Uraga Dock Company (3); Fujinagata Shipyards (3); Maizuru Naval Arsenal (2); Tōkyō Ishikawajima Shipyard (2); Sasebo Naval Arsenal (2)
- Operators: Imperial Japanese Navy
- Preceded by: Kamikaze class
- Succeeded by: Fubuki class
- Built: 1924-1927
- Planned: 12
- Completed: 12
- Lost: 12

General characteristics
- Type: Destroyer
- Displacement: 1,315 long tons (1,336 t) normal, 1,445 long tons (1,468 t) full load
- Length: 97.54 m (320.0 ft) pp, 102.72 m (337.0 ft) overall
- Beam: 9.16 m (30.1 ft)
- Draught: 2.96 m (9.7 ft)
- Propulsion: 4 × Ro-Gō Kampon water-tube boilers; 2 × Kampon geared turbines; 38,500 ihp (28,700 kW); 2 shafts
- Speed: 37.25 knots (68.99 km/h)
- Range: 3,600 nautical miles (6,700 km) at 14 knots (26 km/h)
- Complement: 154
- Armament: (As originally built); 4 ×Type 3 120 mm 45 caliber naval gun, 2 × Type 92 7.7 mm machine gun, 2 × triple Type 12 torpedo tubes; (12 × 610 mm Type 8 torpedoes), 18 × depth charges; 16 × Ichi-Gō naval mines; (Mutsuki, December 1941); 4 ×Type 3 120 mm 45 caliber naval gun; 2 × Type 93 13.2 mm (0.52 in) AA guns, 2 × Type 92 7.7 mm machine gun, 2 × triple Type 12 torpedo tubes; (12 × 610 mm 8th Year Type torpedoes), 18 × depth charges; (Uzuki, December 1942); 4 ×Type 3 120 mm 45 caliber naval gun, 2 × Type 93 13 mm AA guns, 2 × Type 92 7.7 mm machine guns, 2 × triple Type 12 torpedo tubes; (12 × 610 mm 8th Year Type torpedoes), 18 × depth charges; 1 × landing craft; (Uzuki, September 1944); 2 ×Type 3 120 mm 45 caliber naval gun, 16 × Type 96 25 mm AT/AA Guns, 1 × triple Type 12 torpedo tubes; (6 × 610 mm 8th Year Type torpedoes), 36 × depth charges

The Mutsuki-class destroyers (睦月型駆逐艦, Mutsukigata kuchikukan) were a class of twelve destroyers of the Imperial Japanese Navy. All were given traditional poetic names of the months of the year by the Lunar calendar or phases of the moon. Some authors consider the Kamikaze and Mutsuki-class destroyers to be extensions of the earlier Minekaze class.

== Background ==
With the imposition of the Washington Naval Treaty limiting the number and size of capital warships, increased emphasis was placed by the Imperial Japanese Navy on the quantity and firepower of its destroyer fleet to counter what was perceived to be the growing threat from the United States Navy. The Mutsuki-class destroyers were an improved version of the Kamikaze class destroyers and were ordered under the 1923 fiscal budget.

Along with the Minekaze and Kamikaze classes, the Mutsuki-class ships formed the backbone of Japanese destroyer formations throughout the twenties and thirties. The Minekaze and Kamikaze classes were withdrawn from front line service and reassigned to secondary duties towards the end of the 1930s. However, the Mutsukis were retained as first line destroyers due to their range and their more powerful torpedo armament. All saw combat during World War II, and none survived the war.

Initially, the Mutsuki-class ships had only hull numbers due to the projected large number of warships the Japanese navy expected to build through the Eight-eight fleet plan. This proved to be extremely unpopular with the crews and was a constant source of confusion in communications. In August 1928, names were assigned.

== Design ==
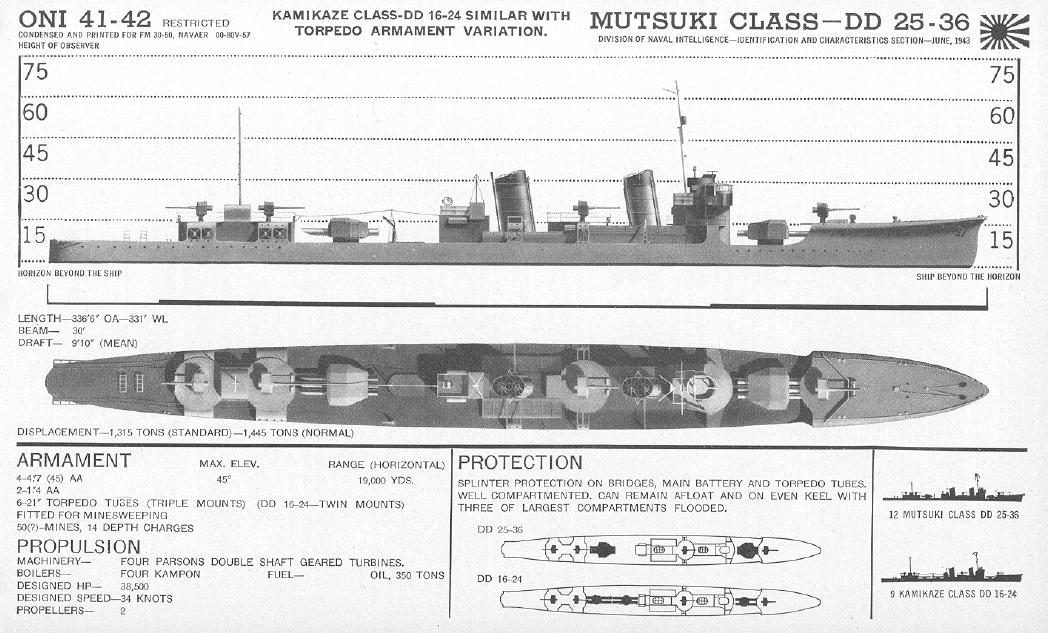
Office of Naval Intelligence recognition drawing of Mutsuki class

The Mutsuki-class destroyers were based on the same hull design as the previous Kamikaze class, except with a double curvature configuration of the bow, a feature to improve seaworthiness which became a standard in all later Japanese destroyers.

The engines utilized four Kampon boilers running two-shaft geared turbines at 38,500 shp, yielding a rated speed of 37 knots (69 km/h), although subsequently modifications increased displacement, and correspondingly reduced speed to 33 knots.

After the Fourth Fleet Incident of September 1935, during which many ships in the Imperial Japanese Navy were damaged by a typhoon while on training exercises, weaknesses in the Mutsuki-class were addressed by retrofitting with a strengthened, more compact, bridge, with raked smokestacks, and with redesigned watertight shields on the torpedo mounts. With these new shields torpedoes could be worked in all weather conditions, thus extending the useful life of the class.

In 1942, Mikazuki had a boiler removed and her aft stack was reduced in size. She was the only ship in the class that had been modified. Yayoi had a similar reduction to her forward funnel; again, she was the only ship of the class so adapted. Between September 1942 and December 1943, Uzuki had her stern modified to facilitate the launching and recovery of landing barges. She was the only ship of the class to be modified as a destroyer transport.

=== Armament ===
The Mutsuki-class destroyers were built with the same main battery as the Kamikaze-class, consisting of four Type 3 120 mm 45 caliber naval guns in single open mounts, exposed to the weather except for a small shield. These were located one forward, two aft (placed back-to-back), and one amidships. There were also two Type 92 7.7 mm anti-aircraft machine guns, one on either side of the bridge. However, the main difference from the Kamikaze class was the use of two triple 24-inch (610 mm) torpedo tubes instead of the previous three double launchers. The newly developed Type 8 torpedoes had greater range and larger warhead than previous torpedoes in the Japanese inventory, but were soon superseded by the famous Type 93 "Long Lance" oxygen-propelled torpedoes during World War II. Also, for the first time on a Japanese destroyer, a reload was carried for each tube. The Mutsuki-class was also equipped with two Type 81 depth charge launchers in the stern, with a total of 18 depth charges.

After the start of the Pacific War, anti-aircraft capabilities were enhanced at the expense of surface warfare capabilities and speed. However, there was no standard modification for the class during the war. Some ships immediately received Type 93 13 mm AA Guns mounted in front of the bridge and abaft the aft stack. From 1941 to 1942, many ships lost one or two of their aft guns in favor of up to ten Type 96 25mm AA Guns.

Of the surviving members of the class in 1943, four had their aft bank of torpedo tubes removed to reduce weight and to permit storage of cargo. The three ships that survived into late 1944 (Uzuki, Satsuki, and Yūzuki), had their suite of anti-aircraft guns increased to 16 and 22 Type 96 guns in single and dual mounts. Satsuki was fitted with a Type 13 radar in February 1944.

== Operational history ==
The Mutsuki class formed the 5th and 6th Destroyer Squadrons. Mutsuki and Kisaragi participated in the Battle of Wake Island at the start of the war, during which time Kisaragi was lost due to aircraft bombardment. The remaining eleven vessels participated in the invasions of the Philippines and Netherlands East Indies. In the subsequent Solomon Islands campaign surviving ships were exposed to considerable danger as fast transports in “Tokyo Express” missions in trying to re-supply island garrisons. Mutsuki, Kikuzuki, Mikazuki and Mochizuki were lost due to air attack in various battles in the Solomons.

Nagatsuki was fatally shot by a 6-inch (152 mm) waterline shell hit, courtesy of the light cruiser USS Honolulu and ran herself aground during the battle of Kula Gulf, 6 July 1943. She was deemed impossible to float and left as a wrecked hulk. Surviving vessels participated in the New Guinea campaign, mostly in the role of “Tokyo Express” transports. Yayoi was lost in an air attack off New Guinea and Fumizuki in Operation Hailstone at Truk. In the final stages of the war, Uzuki was lost to US PT-boats, Satsuki and Yūzuki to air attacks and Minazuki to submarine torpedoes in the Philippines.

None of the Mutsuki-class destroyers survived the war.

== List of ships ==
Construction data
Name	Number	Kanji	Original name (before 1 Aug 1928)	Builder	Laid down	Launched	Completed	Fate
Mutsuki	Dai-19	睦月, 'January'	Dai-19-Gō Kuchikukan (第十九号駆逐艦)	Sasebo Naval Arsenal, Japan	21 May 1924	23 Jul 1925	25 Mar 1926	sunk in air attack in Solomon Islands 07.47°S 160.13°E, 25 Aug 1942; struck 1 Oct 1942
Kisaragi	Dai-21	如月, 'February'	Dai-21-Gō Kuchikukan (第二十一号駆逐艦)	Maizuru Naval Arsenal, Japan	3 Jun 1924	5 Jun 1925	21 Dec 1925	combat loss off Wake Island 18.55°N 166.17°E, 11 Dec 1941; struck 15 Jan 1942
Yayoi	Dai-23	弥生, 'March'	Dai-23-Gō Kuchikukan (第二十三号駆逐艦)	Uraga Dock Company, Japan	11 Jan 1924	11 Jul 1925	28 Aug 1926	sunk in air attack in Solomon Islands 08.45°S 151.25°E, 11 Sep 1942; struck 20 Oct 1942
Uzuki	Dai-25	卯月, 'April'	Dai-25-Gō Kuchikukan (第二十五号駆逐艦)	Tōkyō Ishikawajima Shipyard, Japan	11 Jan 1924	15 Oct 1925	14 Sep 1926	Sunk Ormoc Bay 11.03°N 124.23°E, 12 Dec 1944; struck 10 Jan 1945
Satsuki	Dai-27	皐月, 'May'		Fujinagata Shipyards, Japan	1 Dec 1923	25 Mar 1925	15 Nov 1925	sunk in air attack at Manila Bay 15.35°N 120.55°E, 21 Sep 1944; struck 10 Nov 1944
Minazuki	Dai-28	水無月, 'June'	Dai-28-Gō Kuchikukan (第二十八号駆逐艦)	Uraga Dock Company, Japan	24 Mar 1925	25 May 1926	22 Mar 1927	Torpedoed in Celebes Sea 04.05°N 119.30°E, 6 Jun 1944; struck 10 Aug 1944
Fumizuki	Dai-29	文月, 'July'	Dai-29-Gō Kuchikukan (第二十九号駆逐艦)	Fujinagata Shipyards, Japan	20 Oct 1924	16 Feb 1926	3 Jul 1926	sunk in air attack at Truk 07.24°N 151.44°E, 18 Feb 1944; struck 31 Mar 1944
Nagatsuki	Dai-30	長月, 'September'	Dai-30-Gō Kuchikukan (第三十号駆逐艦)	Tōkyō Ishikawajima Shipyard, Japan	16 Apr 1925	6 Oct 1926	30 Apr 1927	wrecked by USS Honolulu during the Battle of Kula Gulf 08.02°S 157.12°E, 6 Jul 1943; struck 1 Nov 1943
Kikuzuki	Dai-31	菊月, 'Chrysanthemum Moon'	Dai-31-Gō Kuchikukan (第三十一号駆逐艦)	Maizuru Naval Arsenal, Japan	15 Jun 1925	15 May 1926	20 Nov 1926	sunk in air attack at Tulagi 09.07°S 160.12°E, 4 May 1942; struck 25 May 1942; Later salvaged by USS Menominee (AT-73), 6 Oct 1943
Mikazuki	Dai-32	三日月, 'Crescent Moon'	Dai-32-Gō Kuchikukan (第三十二号駆逐艦)	Sasebo Naval Arsenal, Japan	21 Aug 1925	12 Jul 1926	5 May 1927	sunk in air attack at Cape Gloucester 05.27°S 148.25°E, 29 Jul 1943; struck 15 Oct 1943
Mochizuki	Dai-33	望月, 'Full Moon'	Dai-33-Gō Kuchikukan (第三十三号駆逐艦)	Uraga Dock Company, Japan	23 Mar 1926	28 Apr 1927	31 Oct 1927	sunk in air attack in central Solomons 05.42°S 151.40°E, 24 Oct 1943; struck 5 Jan 1944
Yūzuki	Dai-34	夕月, 'Evening Moon'	Dai-34-Gō Kuchikukan (第三十四号駆逐艦)	Fujinagata Shipyards, Japan	27 Nov 1926	4 Mar 1927	25 Jul 1927	sunk in air attack at Cebu 11.20°N 124.10°E, 12 Dec 1944; struck 10 Jan 1945
