= Kamikaze-class destroyer (1922) =

Class of Japanese destroyers

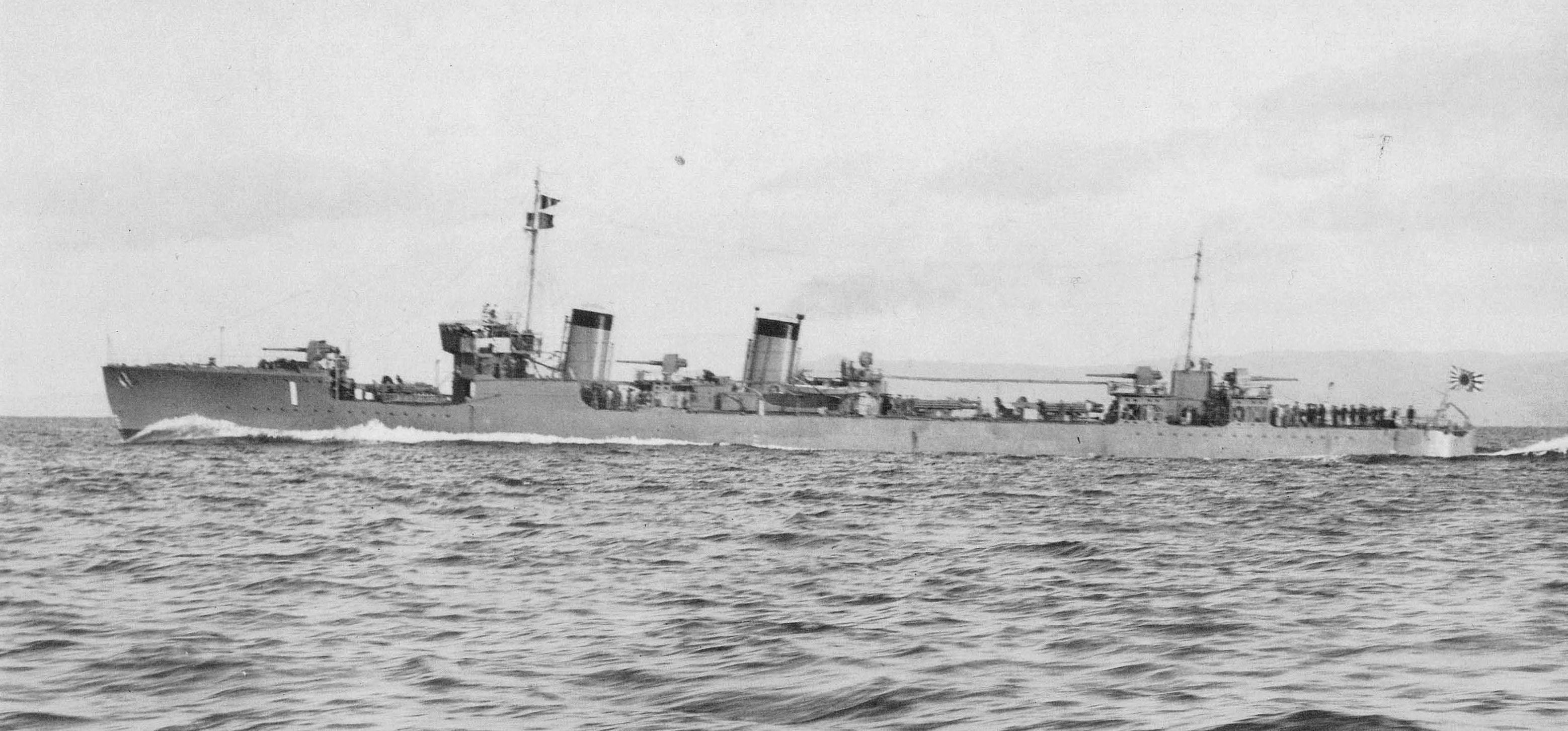
- Kamikaze underway on 23 December 1922.

Class overview
- Name: Kamikaze class
- Builders: Maizuru Naval Arsenal (3); Mitsubishi Shipbuilding & Eng. (2); Uraga Dock Company (1); Tōkyō Ishikawajima Shipyard (1); Fujinagata Shipyards (1); Sasebo Naval Arsenal (1)
- Operators: Imperial Japanese Navy
- Preceded by: Wakatake class
- Succeeded by: Mutsuki class
- In commission: 1921–1947
- Planned: 27
- Completed: 9
- Cancelled: 18
- Lost: 8
- Retired: 1

General characteristics
- Type: Destroyer
- Displacement: 1,400 long tons (1,422 t) normal, 1,720 long tons (1,748 t) full load
- Length: 97.5 m (320 ft) pp, 102.6 m (337 ft) overall
- Beam: 9.1 m (30 ft)
- Draught: 2.9 m (9.5 ft)
- Propulsion: (Kamikaze to Hatakaze); 4 × Ro-Gō Kampon water-tube boilers; 2 × Parsons geared turbines; 38,500 shp; 2 shafts; (Oite to Yūnagi); 4 × Ro-Gō Kampon water-tube boilers; 2 × Kampon geared turbines; 38,500 ihp (28,700 kW); 2 shafts
- Speed: (Kamikaze to Hatakaze); 37.25 knots (68.99 km/h); (Oite to Yūnagi); 36.88 knots (68.30 km/h)
- Range: 3600 nm @ 14 knots; (6,700 km at 26 km/h)
- Complement: 154
- Armament: 4 × Type 3 120 mm 45 caliber naval gun; 2 × 7.7mm machine guns; 6× 53cm torpedoes (in 3 double mounts); 18 × depth charges

The Kamikaze-class destroyers (神風型駆逐艦, Kamikazegata kuchikukan) were a class of nine destroyers of the Imperial Japanese Navy. Some authors consider the Nokaze, Kamikaze and Mutsuki classes to be extensions of the Minekaze-class destroyers, and the Kamikaze class is sometimes referred to as the "Kiyokaze class" to distinguish it from the earlier World War I-era destroyer class of the same name. Obsolete by the beginning of the Pacific War, the Kamikazes were relegated to mostly secondary roles. Most ultimately were lost to U.S. submarines.

== Background ==
The Kamikaze-class vessels were an extension and improvement to the ongoing Minekaze-class program as part of the Eight-eight fleet Plan. They were ordered under the 1921-1922 fiscal budget. As with the Wakatake class, they were originally given only numbers rather than names, but were assigned individual names on 1 August 1928.

Construction of the last two planned Kamikaze vessels was cancelled in conformance with the Washington Naval Treaty. Oite, Hayate, Asanagi and Yūnagi were called the Kamikaze-class late production model (or occasionally Oite-class), as the powerplant and armaments were different.

== Design ==
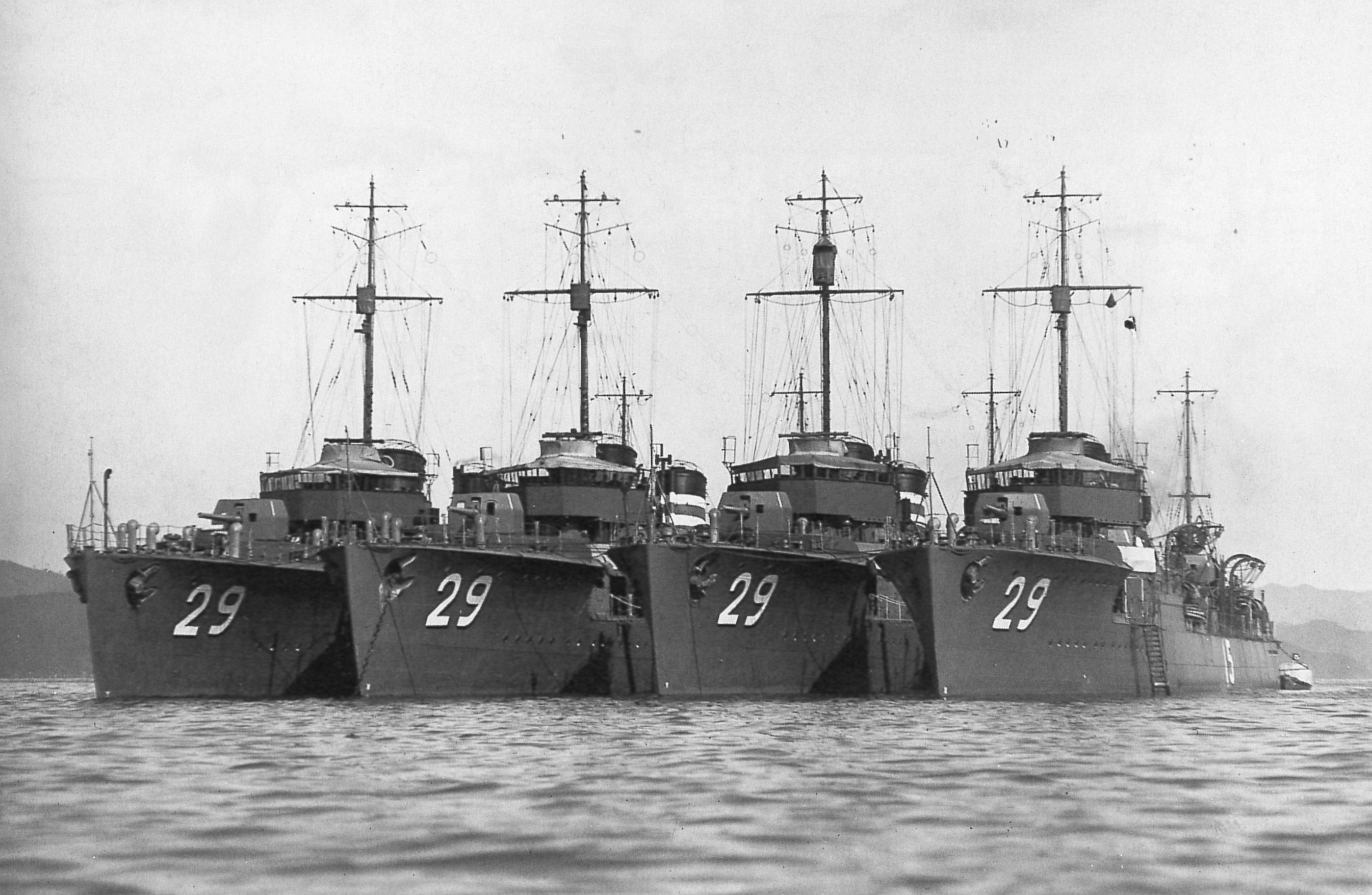
Kamikaze-class Oite group four destroyers, circa 1926.

The Kamikaze-class ships were visually identical to the earlier Minekaze class, apart from slight detail changes in the bridge. The Kamikaze class was the first destroyer class in the Imperial Japanese Navy to be built with a bridge strengthened by steel plating. This gave the vessels a higher center of gravity, and to counteract this they were built with an increased displacement and a wider beam for better stability. Although they had slightly less speed >37.5 knots (69.5 km/h) they were considered satisfactory compared with the Minekaze class.

=== Armament ===
The Kamikaze-class ships were essentially the same design as the Nokaze sub-class of the previous Minekaze-class destroyers. The three twin 21-inch (533 mm) torpedo tubes (one positioned in the well in front of the bridge and the other two located abaft the second stack) was unchanged; however, the launchers were now power-operated rather than manually operated. The main battery was also unchanged, with four Type 3 120 mm 45 caliber naval guns in single open mounts, exposed to the weather except for a small shield. For anti-aircraft protection, the 6.5mm machine guns mounted on each side of the bridge were replaced by two single 7.7mm machine guns. The final three vessels in the Kamikaze-class were also equipped with depth charges, with two Type 81 launchers deployed on the stern.

Following the start of the Pacific War, the Kamikaze-class vessels were modified for enhanced anti-aircraft capability at the expense of speed and surface warfare performance. One of both of the aft guns and the aft torpedo launcher were replaced by Type 96 25-mm anti-aircraft guns, which were added in increasing numbers, and eventually totaled between 13 and 20 guns per vessel in a combination of single and twin mounts. These modifications increased the displacement on some vessels to 1,523 tons, which reduced their maximum speed down to 35 knots.

== Operational history ==
The Kamikaze-class vessels all saw combat during the Pacific War, with Hayate having the somewhat-dubious distinction of being the first Japanese destroyer to be lost in combat during that conflict. She was sunk during the Battle of Wake Island in December 1941. By 1944 four Kamikaze-class vessels had been sunk by American submarines and a fifth was lost in an air raid on Truk. In 1945 a sixth ship was sunk by submarine action. Only Kamikaze and Harukaze survived the war, but Harukaze was in such poor condition when surrendered at Sasebo that she was soon scrapped. Kamikaze continued on as a repatriation ship after it was surrendered at Singapore, but grounded off Cape Omaezaki in June 1946 and was written off.

== Class members ==
Note these vessels only carried numbers ("Dai") until 1 August 1928, when they were given meteorological names.

Construction data
Name	Kanji	Number	Builder	Laid down	Launched	Completed	Fate
Kamikaze	神風	Dai-1	Mitsubishi Shipbuilding & Engineering Co., Japan	15 December 1921	25 September 1922	19 December 1922	renamed Kamikaze on 1 August 1928; demilitarized repatriation ship 1 December 1945; grounded Omaezaki 7 June 1946; stricken 26 June 1946
Asakaze	朝風	Dai-3	Mitsubishi Shipbuilding & Engineering Co., Japan	16 February 1922	8 December 1922	16 June 1923	renamed Asakaze on 1 August 1928; Torpedoed west of Luzon [16.06N, 119.44E] 23 August 1944; stricken 10 October 1944
Harukaze	春風	Dai-5	Maizuru Naval Arsenal, Japan	16 May 1922	18 December 1922	31 May 1923	renamed Harukaze on 1 August 1928; surrendered to USN 10 November 1945-11-10; scrapped 1947
Matsukaze	松風	Dai-7	Maizuru Naval Arsenal, Japan	2 December 1922	30 October 1923	5 April 1924	renamed Matsukaze on 1 August 1928; Torpedoed NW of Chichijima [26.59N, 143.13E] 9 June 1944; stricken 10 August 1944
Hatakaze	旗風	Dai-9	Maizuru Naval Arsenal, Japan	3 July 1923	15 March 1924	30 August 1924	renamed Hatakaze on 1 August 1928; sunk by air attack off Takao [22.37N, 120.15E] 15 January 1945; stricken 10 March 1945
Oite	追風	Dai-11	Uraga Dock Company, Japan	16 March 1923	27 November 1924	30 October 1925	renamed Oite on 1 August 1928; sunk by air attack at Truk [07.40N, 151.45E] 18 February 1944; stricken 11 March 1944
Hayate	疾風	Dai-13	Tōkyō Ishikawajima Shipyard, Japan	11 November 1922	24 March 1925	21 November 1925	renamed Hayate on 1 August 1928; combat loss in Battle of Wake Island [19.16N, 166.37E] 11 December 1941; stricken 10 January 1942
Asanagi	朝凪	Dai-15	Fujinagata Shipyards, Japan	5 March 1923	21 April 1924	29 December 1925	renamed Asanagi on 1 August 1928; torpedoed W of Ogasawara [28.20N, 138.57E] 22 May 1944; stricken 10 July 1944
Yūnagi	夕凪	Dai-17	Sasebo Naval Arsenal, Japan	17 September 1923	23 April 1924	24 May 1925	renamed Yūnagi on 1 August 1928; torpedoed NW of Luzon [18.46N, 120.46E] 25 August 1944; struck 10 October 1944

== Naming history ==
The IJN originally planned that the Kamikaze-class ships should have names, but upon completion they were given numbers due to the projected large number of warships the IJN expected to build through the Eight-eight fleet plan. This proved to be extremely unpopular with the crews and was a constant source of confusion in communications. In August 1928, names were assigned, but not the original names that were planned.

Naming history
Final name (renamed 1 August 1928)		Originally planned name	Name as completed	Renamed 24 April 1924
Name	Translation	Originally planned name	Name as completed	Renamed 24 April 1924
Kamikaze	Divine Wind	Kiyokaze (清風), Pure Wind; or Soyokaze (微風), Breeze	Dai-1 Kuchikukan (第一駆逐艦), 1st Destroyer	Dai-1-Gō Kuchikukan (第一号駆逐艦), No.1 Destroyer
Asakaze	Morning Wind	Karukaze (軽風), Light Wind	Dai-3 Kuchikukan (第三駆逐艦), 3rd Destroyer	Dai-3-Gō Kuchikukan (第三号駆逐艦), No.3 Destroyer
Harukaze	Spring Wind	Makaze (真風), True Wind	Dai-5 Kuchikukan (第五駆逐艦), 5th Destroyer	Dai-5-Gō Kuchikukan (第五号駆逐艦), No.5 Destroyer
Matsukaze	Wind among the pine trees		Dai-7 Kuchikukan (第七駆逐艦), 7th Destroyer	Dai-7-Gō Kuchikukan (第七号駆逐艦), No.7 Destroyer
Hatakaze	Wind causing waving of a flag		Dai-9 Kuchikukan (第九駆逐艦), 9th Destroyer	Dai-9-Gō Kuchikukan (第九号駆逐艦), No.9 Destroyer
Oite	Fair Wind		Dai-11-Gō Kuchikukan (第十一号駆逐艦), No.11 Destroyer	—N/a
Hayate	Squall		Dai-13-Gō Kuchikukan (第十三号駆逐艦), No.13 Destroyer	—N/a
Asanagi	Morning Calm		Dai-15-Gō Kuchikukan (第十五号駆逐艦), No.15 Destroyer	—N/a
Yūnagi	Evening Calm		Dai-17-Gō Kuchikukan (第十七号駆逐艦), No.17 Destroyer	—N/a
—N/a		Ōkaze (大風), Great Wind	—N/a	—N/a
—N/a		Tsumujikaze (旋風), Whirlwind	—N/a	—N/a
