= Uraga, Kanagawa =

City near Tokyo Bay

Coordinates: 35°14′N 139°43′E

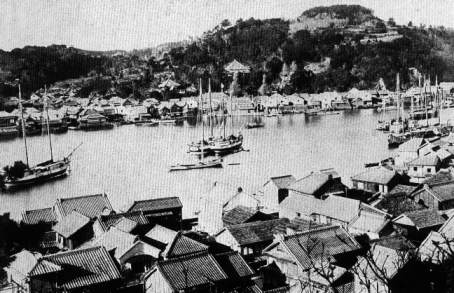
The harbour of Uraga circa 1890

Uraga (浦賀) is a subdivision of the city of Yokosuka, Kanagawa Prefecture, Japan. It is located on the eastern side of the Miura Peninsula, at the northern end of the Uraga Channel, at the entrance of Tokyo Bay.

== History ==
With the establishment of the Tokugawa shogunate based in Edo at the start of the 17th century, the small village of Uraga developed rapidly due to its sheltered harbor and strategic location at the entrance of Edo Bay. The area was tenryō territory under direct control of the shogunate, and the increase in maritime traffic led to the development of merchant and trading firms in the area. In 1720, the shogunate established the post of Uraga bugyō, whose responsibility was to police traffic and to organize coastal defenses, and the entrances to the harbor were fortified with cannon against possible incursions by foreign ships in violation of Japan’s national isolation policy.

Still, in 1812, the British whaler Saracen stopped at Uraga and took on water, food, and firewood.

In 1846, Captain James Biddle of the United States Navy anchored two warships, USS Columbus and USS Vincennes in Uraga Channel. This was a first step in what turned out to be an unsuccessful effort to an open trading relationship between Japan and the United States.

On July 14, 1853, United States Navy officer Matthew C. Perry and his black ships anchored in front of Uraga and subsequently surveyed within the borders of Edo Bay. On the return of the squadron in 1854, the ships passed Uraga to anchor closer to Edo at Kanagawa, which is where the city of Yokohama now stands.

In 1860, Kanrin Maru (咸臨丸), Japan's first sail and screw-driven steam corvette departed Uraga with the first Japanese Embassy to the United States.

In the Meiji period, the town of Uraga was administratively part of Miura District of Kanagawa Prefecture. It was merged into the city of Yokosuka on April 1, 1943. The Uraga Dock Company, a privately held shipyard, was the major industry in the area, and many destroyers of the Imperial Japanese Navy, and subsequently the Japan Maritime Self-Defense Force were built at its docks. Dock number 2 is still in operation.

Uraga is now primarily a bedroom community for commuters to Yokohama and Tokyo.
