= Japanese cruiser Yura =

Nagara class light cruiser (1923–1942)

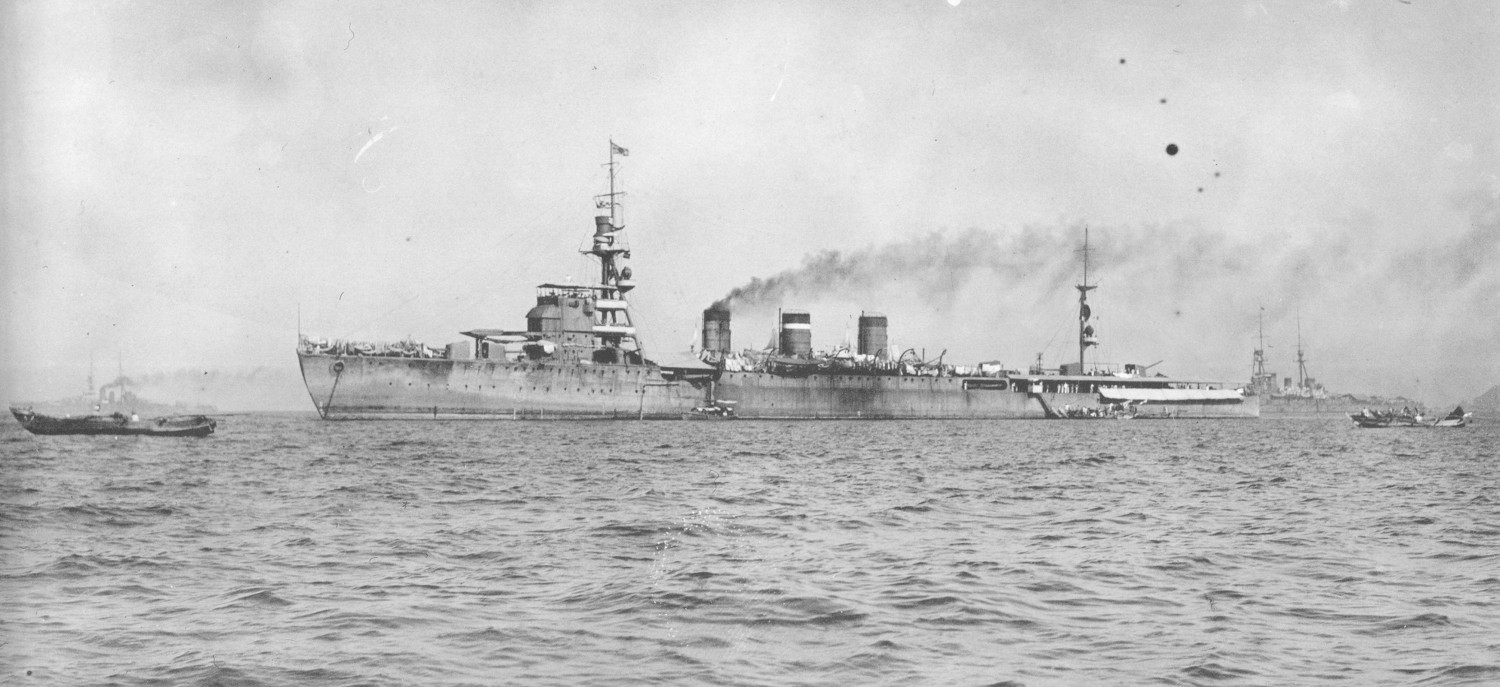
- Yura anchored in Tateyama Bay in early August 1923

History

Empire of Japan
- Name: Yura
- Namesake: Yura River
- Ordered: 1920 Fiscal Year
- Builder: Sasebo Naval Arsenal
- Laid down: 21 May 1921
- Launched: 15 February 1922
- Commissioned: 20 March 1923
- Stricken: 20 November 1942
- Fate: Scuttled, 25 October 1942

General characteristics (as built)
- Class & type: Nagara-class cruiser
- Displacement: 5,170 long tons (5,253 t) (standard)
- Length: 162.15 m (532 ft) (o/a)
- Beam: 14.17 m (46 ft 6 in)
- Draft: 4.86 m (15 ft 11 in)
- Installed power: 12 Kampon boilers; 90,000 shp (67,000 kW)
- Propulsion: 4 shafts; 4 geared steam turbines
- Speed: 36 knots (67 km/h; 41 mph)
- Range: 6,000 nmi (11,000 km; 6,900 mi) at 14 knots (26 km/h; 16 mph)
- Complement: 450
- Armament: 7 × single 14 cm (5.5 in) guns; 2 × single 7.6 cm (3 in) AA guns; 4 × twin 61 cm (24 in) torpedo tubes; 48 x naval mines
- Armor: Belt: 63.4 mm (2.5 in); Deck: 28.6 mm (1.1 in)
- Aircraft carried: 1 × Floatplane
- Aviation facilities: 1 × Flying-off platform

Yura (由良) was the fourth of the six ships completed in the Nagara class of light cruisers for the Imperial Japanese Navy (IJN), and like other vessels of her class, she was intended for use as the flagship of a destroyer flotilla. She served in the early stages of World War II.

== Background and description ==
The second batch of three Nagara-class cruisers, including Yura, was authorized by the Diet as part of the 8-6 Fleet Completion Program on 12 March 1918 although they were not funded until the Fiscal Year 1920 Naval Estimates. The ships were intended to serve as flagships for destroyer and submarine squadrons, long-range scouts for the battlefleet, and to protect Japanese merchant shipping. The Nagara class was intended to displace 5,170 long tons (5,250 t) at (standard load) and 5,570 long tons (5,660 t) at normal load, but was slightly overweight and actually displaced 5,690 long tons (5,780 t). They had an overall length of 162.15 meters (532 ft), a beam of 14.17 meters (46 ft 6 in), and a draft of 4.86 meters (15 ft 11 in) Their crew numbered 37 officers and 413 enlisted men. When serving as a flagship, an additional 5 officers and 22 enlisted men were embarked.

The Nagaras propulsion system consisted of four geared steam turbines, each driving one propeller shaft using steam from a dozen Kampon water-tube boilers. All of the boilers but two were oil-fired and those used a mixed-firing system where fuel oil was sprayed onto the coal to increase power. The turbines developed a total of 90,000 shaft horsepower (67,000 kW) and were intended to give the cruisers a speed of 36 knots (67 km/h; 41 mph). Yura only reached 35.2 knots (65.2 km/h; 40.5 mph) from 94,331 shp (70,343 kW) when the ship ran her sea trials on 18 February 1923. The ships carried enough fuel oil and coal to give them a range of 6,000 nautical miles (11,000 km; 6,900 mi) at 14 knots (26 km/h; 16 mph), an increase of 1,000 nmi (1,900 km; 1,200 mi) from their designed range.

=== Armament, fire control and protection ===
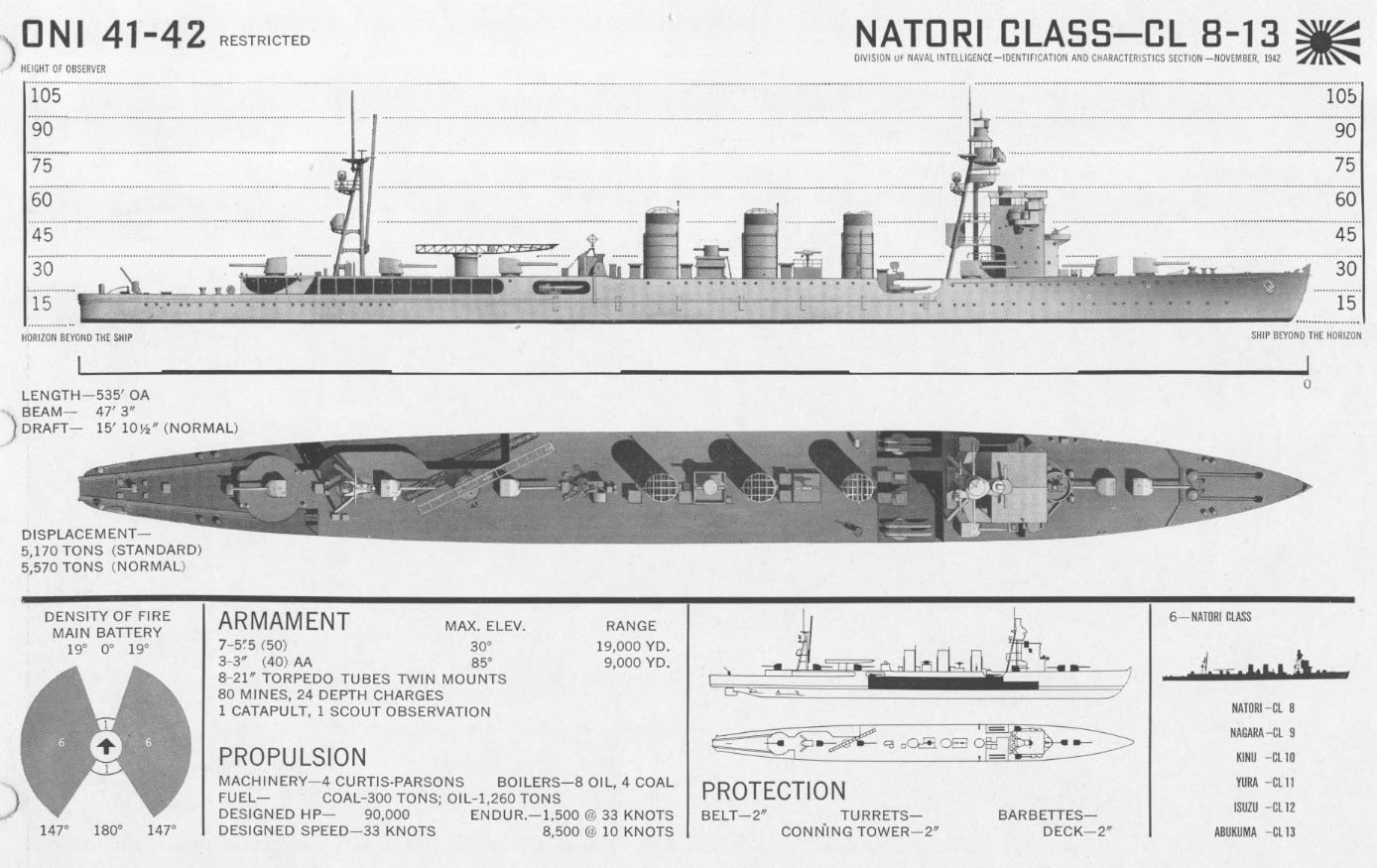
Ship recognition diagram of the Nagara-class cruisers from the US Office of Naval Intelligence

The cruisers' main battery consisted of seven 14-centimeter (5.5 in) 3rd Year Type guns in single gun mounts protected by gun shields. Five of the guns were mounted on the centerline, one pair mounted back to back forward of the bridge and three aft of the funnels, on the aft superstructure. The remaining guns were positioned abreast the bridge, one on each broadside. For anti-aircraft defense, the ships were fitted with a pair of 76-millimeter (3 in) 3rd Year Type anti-aircraft (AA) guns abreast the middle funnel and two 6.5-millimeter (0.26 in) Type 3 heavy machine guns on a platform between the middle and rear funnels, one on each broadside. The ships were equipped with four rotating Type 8 twin-tube mounts for 61-centimeter (24 in) Type 8 torpedoes, two mounts on each broadside. Each tube was provided with a single reload torpedo forward of the mount. The Nagara-class ships were fitted with two rails at the stern that could accommodate 48 No. 1 naval mines These were actually a pair of mines that were connected by a 100-meter (110 yd) cable and were intended to be dropped ahead of ahead of enemy ships so that hitting the cable would draw one or both mines in towards the ship's hull.

The main guns were controlled by a Type 13 director located at the top of the tripod mast. To determine the distance to the target, a pair of 2.5-meter (8 ft 2 in) rangefinders were fitted, one on the bridge and the other near the 6.5 mm machine guns. An additional 1.5-meter (4 ft 11 in) rangefinder was positioned on a platform between the forward and middle funnels.

The armor of the 5,500-ton cruisers was designed to protect against American 4-inch (102 mm) shells and the ships were equipped with a waterline armor belt 63.4 millimeters (2.50 in) thick amidships that protected the propulsion machinery. Made from high-tensile steel, it consisted of a inner 25.4-millimeter (1 in) plate and an outer 38-millimeter (1.5 in) plate. The belt connected to the armored deck at the top and the double bottom below. The deck armor was also high-tensile steel, 28.6 millimeters (1.13 in) thick.

=== Aircraft ===
Inspired by the British deployment of aviation facilities aboard their C-class and Danae-class cruisers, the Nagara-class cruisers were built with an aircraft hangar in the forward superstructure and a 10-meter (390 in) flying-off platform that extended over one of the forward guns. Yura conducted trials with a Yokosuka E1Y2 reconnaissance floatplane in 1927–1928 that was stowed on the flying-off platform and lowered to the sea for takeoff and recovered by a derrick installed next to the bridge. The ship had an experimental spring-powered catapult installed on the platform in mid-1930 for trials with an Aichi E3A1 floatplane. Numerous accidents caused its replacement in October by a cordite-powered, 17-meter (55 ft 9 in) Kure Type 2, Model 2 catapult.

During Yura's September 1933 – January 1934 refit, the hangar was converted into offices for the admiral's staff, radio rooms and storage compartments, the flying-off platform, its catapult and the derrick was removed and a rotating 19.4-meter (63 ft 8 in) Kure Type 2, Model 3 catapult was installed forward of the mainmast, between two gun mounts. The pole mainmast was converted into a tripod mast with a stronger derrick to handle the aircraft. The cruiser operated a Nakajima E4N2 floatplane until the end of 1934 when a Kawanishi E7K floatplane was embarked.

=== Modifications ===
During her September 1933 – January 1934 refit, the ship's anti-aircraft suite was upgraded; the 76 mm AA guns was replaced by twin mounts for 13.2-millimeter (0.52 in) Type 93 machine guns and the 6.5 mm machine guns were replaced by 7.7-millimeter (0.30 in) Lewis guns. In addition a quadruple mount for Type 93 machine guns was installed in front of the bridge and the 2.5-meter rangefinder on the bridge was replaced by a 3.5-meter (11 ft 6 in) model. After the torpedo boat Tomozuru capsized during a storm in 1934, the IJN realized that many of its ships were top-heavy and began modifying them to make them more stable. Yura began her modifications in October that included reducing the amount of equipment above the upper deck, shortening the foremast, and adding 195 long tons (198 t) of ballast. The IJN took advantage of the ship's time in the shipyard to convert the mixed-firing boilers to fuel oil only and converting the lower coal bunkers to oil storage and the upper bunkers to a radio room and storage compartments. The ship was also modified to pump 199 long tons (202 t) of seawater aboard to her improve her stability as necessary.

After several of the 5,500-ton cruisers suffered structural damage during the Fourth Fleet Incident in 1935, the ship's hull was strengthened by reinforcing the joints and adding Ducol steel plates to the deck and sides in 1936–1937. A single 12.7 mm (0.50 in) BI machine gun was installed on the bridge in July 1937. The 13.2 mm machine gun mounts were replaced by four 2.5 cm Type 96 AA guns in twin mounts in 1938.

== Construction and career ==
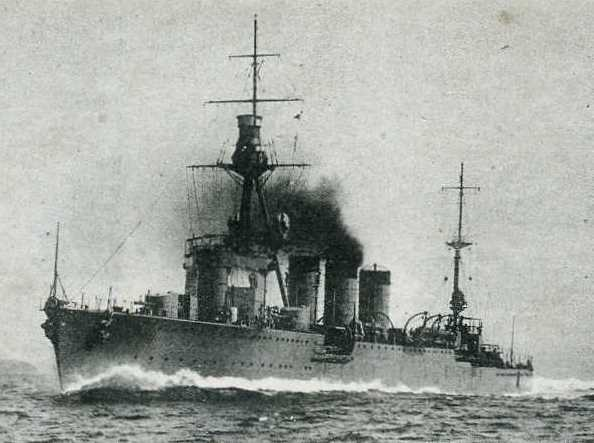
Front oblique view of Yura underway

Yura, named after the Yura River, was laid down on 21 May 1921 at the Sasebo Naval Arsenal, launched on 15 February 1922 and completed on 20 March 1923. The ship became the flagship of the 5th Cruiser Squadron (Sendai) which included her sister ships Nagara, Natori, and Kinu on 1 April. Together with 2nd Destroyer Squadron, the 5th Squadron patrolled Chinese waters between 25 August and 4 September. The squadron, now consisting of Yura, Nagara and Natori, was assigned to the Second Fleet on 1 December. Reinforced by the light cruiser Sendai in May, the division made a cruise to Hahajima Island in October 1924. On 1 December, Yura became a private ship in the 5th Squadron which patrolled Chinese waters off the Yangtze River delta, Qingdao (Tsingtao) and Dalian (Dairen) from 25 March to 23 April 1925. The squadron made another cruise off Qindao beginning on 29 March 1926, but Yura returned to Sasebo on 1 April. She was commanded by Captain Soemu Toyoda from November 1926 to November 1927 and became flagship of Submarine Squadron 1 on 1 December. Two weeks later, the ship began trials with a Yokosuka E1Y2 floatplane and led her squadron on a patrol off Qindao from 26–27 March to 16 April 1927 together with the Third Cruiser Squadron. Yura was reduced to reserve at Sasebo on 1 December 1927.

On 10 December 1928, the ship was reactivated with Captain Otagaki Tomisaburō in command and became flagship of the Third Cruiser Squadron of the First Fleet. Escorted by the First Destroyer Squadron, the unit patrolled Chinese waters off Qindao, Dalian, and Qinhuangdao (Chinwangtao) from 29 March to 21 April 1929. Captain Wada Senzō replaced Otagaki on 1 November. The following year, the cruiser squadron visited Dalian in March–April. Yura was fitted with a spring-powered catapult for trials mid-year, but they were unsatisfactory and the catapult was replaced by a cordite-powered one in October 1930. The ship was placed in reserved on 1 December at Sasebo, but she was reactivated on 1 December 1931 and rejoined the Third Cruiser Squadron under the command of Captain Umataro Tanimoto.

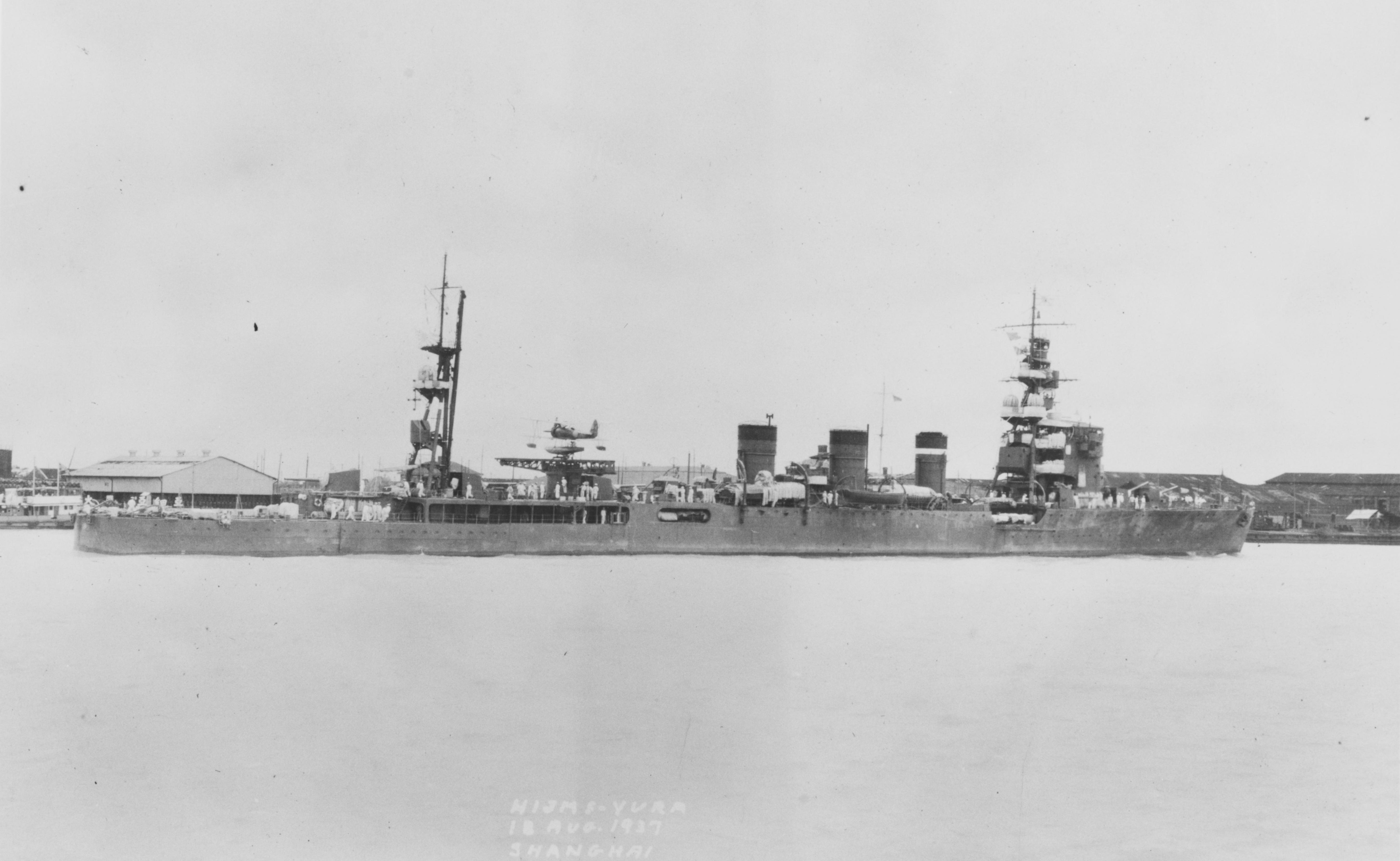
Yura in Shanghai, China, 18 August 1932

Following the Manchurian Incident and the subsequent Japanese invasion of Manchuria in 1931, the Imperial Japanese Army (IJA) instigated riots in Shanghai, China, that allowed it to attack units of the Chinese Army in and around Shanghai on 28 January 1932. The IJN dispatched the Third Cruiser Squadron, consisting of Yura, and her sisters Naka and Abukuma to the Shanghai area on 28–29 January. On 4 February, the squadron bombarded Chinese fortifications and positions at Wusong, near the confluence of the Huangpu River and the Yangtze River estuary. Yura and the Yubari supported attacks by the 9th Division and continued to provide gunfire support until their departure on 20 March. Upon her arrival back in Sasebo, Yura was docked for several months to repair damage inflicted by the muzzle blast of her own guns.

The ship remained part of the Third Cruiser Division until 20 May 1933 when all three sisters were transferred to the newly formed 7th Cruiser Squadron. Captain Rokuzō Sugiyama commanded the ship from 15 June to 15 November 1933. The squadron visited ports in Japanese Taiwan on 5–15 July and then patrolled southern Chinese waters until returning to Japan on 21 August, after which it participated in a fleet review off Yokohama four days later. Yura became the flagship of the Second Submarine Squadron on 1 November, although she had begun a lengthy refit in September that lasted until 25 January 1934. The squadron made a brief visit to Qingdao between 27 September and 5 October. After her return, the ship had a refit that improved her stability that lasted until January 1935 and Captain Wakabayashi Seisaku assumed command on 1 November. The squadron departed for a cruise off the Kurile Islands on 7 February 1935 and returned on 25 February. It participated in the Great Maneuvers of the Combined Fleet from 20 July to 2 October. Yura was assigned to the Sasebo Guard Squadron, formed from ships in reserve, on 15 November and had her hull strengthened and her engines repaired during a refit from 10 June 1936 to March 1937.

Yura became the flagship of Cruiser Squadron 8, commanded by Rear Admiral Chūichi Nagumo, of the First Fleet when she was recommissioned in March. The squadron made a cruise to Qingdao, returning to Japan on 6 April. After the beginning of the Second Sino-Japanese War on 7 July, the cruisers departed Sasebo for a brief patrol in northern Chinese waters on 22 July, returning eight days later. The squadron was deployed to the Shanghai area on 10 August and supported operations there until returning home on 23 October. It was redeployed to that area a week later to support the amphibious landings by the IJA on the northern coast of Hangzhou Bay, south of Shanghai, in early November and arrived back at Sasebo on 22 November, after Captain Ichioka Hisashi had taken command on 15 November. Yura became a private ship on 1 December and had a brief refit from 24 March to 7 April 1938. The squadron patrolled southern Chinese waters later in April and the area off Shanghai in September. It reinforced the blockade of southern Chinese waters in October and November. The 8th Cruiser Squadron made a brief cruise of northern Chinese waters between 22 March 1939 and 2 April. Yura spent most of the month of August operating in southern Chinese waters. On 15 November the cruiser became the flagship of the Fifth Submarine Squadron which was assigned to the newly formed Fourth Fleet which was tasked with the defense of the islands of the South Seas Mandate. To this purpose Yura and her submarines operated there between 16 May 1940 and 22 September. The squadron was transferred to the Combined Fleet on 15 November and the ship patrolled the South China Sea in February–March 1941.

As of 1 September 1941, Yura was the flagship of Rear Admiral Daigo Tadashige, commander of the Fifth Submarine Squadron. The squadron was ordered to proceed to Palau with four submarines, I-62, I-64, I-65, and I-66 on 26 November. They were diverted to Sanya, Hainan Island, where they arrived on 3 December and assigned to the Malaya Invasion Force.

=== Early stages of the Pacific War ===
When the attack on Pearl Harbor began on 8 December (Japanese time), Yura was covering the first troop convoy south of the Cape of Camau, French Indochina, while her submarines were part of a patrol line north of the Anambas Islands. The following afternoon, I-65 spotted the British Force Z, (the battleship HMS Prince of Wales, battlecruiser HMS Repulse and supporting destroyers) that was enroute to the Gulf of Siam to attack the convoy. The submarine had problems transmitting its report so that Yura and the other addressees had difficulties decoding it and it took about two hours before the news was received by Vice Admiral Jisaburō Ozawa, commander of the invasion force. I-65 pursued Force Z until it was forced to dive when it spotted an unknown aircraft. Yura unsuccessfully searched for the British ships west of Poulo Condore Island until they were located and sunk by IJN torpedo bombers based in Indochina on 10 December, after which the ship proceeded to Cam Ranh Bay.

Yura was then attached to No. 2 Escort Unit for the rest of the month, escorting troop convoys during the invasion of Borneo from 13 – 26 December, and covering amphibious landings in Brunei, Miri, Seria, and Kuching. The assaulting troops occupied their objectives against little resistance, and Yura returned to Cam Ranh Bay on 27 December to begin a refit that lasted until 16 January 1942. Daigo hauled down his flag on 19 January and Yura became a private ship. She was assigned to the Main Force of the Escort Group of the Malay Force two days later and covered the landings at Endau, British Malaya, on 26 January. The ship patrolled the area between Cap St. Jacques (Vũng Tàu) and Natuna Besar until her return to Cam Ranh Bay on 3 February.

The cruiser was assigned to No. 2 Escort Unit in February to command the escort force for the 38th Division invading Sumatra in the Dutch East Indies, but she was reassigned to the covering force for the operation from the First Southern Expeditionary Fleet on 8 February. The unit departed Cam Ranh Bay two days later. A reconnaissance aircraft spotted ships north of Banka Strait that appeared to be escaping from British Singapore on 12 February and Ozawa split his force to intercept the ships before they could attack the invasion convoys. The British gunboat HMS Scorpion escaped detection and was able to set one Japanese transport on fire before she was sunk by Yura and the destroyers Fubuki and Asagiri on the evening of 14 February. The small Dutch cargo ship SS Makassar scuttled itself when approached by Yura and Asagiri the following evening. The cruiser covered the landings of troops at Palembang, Bangka Island, and Bantam Bay and Merak on Java during the rest of the month.

On 1 March 1942, the Dutch submarine HNLMS K XIV fired two torpedoes at Yura, but both either missed or were duds. On 4 March, the ship rescued the crew of the oil tanker Erimo that had been sunk by the American submarine USS S-39. Assigned to the No. 1 Escort Unit on 6 March, Yura escorted the invasion convoy for and covered the landings in Northern Sumatra (Operation T) until 15 March when she arrived at Penang, Occupied Malaya.

=== Indian Ocean Raids ===
To prepare for offensive operations against the Royal Navy in the Indian Ocean and to secure the line of communication between Singapore and Occupied Burma, the IJN General Staff ordered on 4 February that the Andaman Islands should be seized when practicable (Operation D). No. 1 Escort Unit, including Yura, and three troopships departed Penang on 20 March. The Japanese troops made an unopposed landing on Ross Island three days later. Yura arrived at Mergui, Burma, on 28 March.

In April, Yura was assigned to the raids in the Indian Ocean under Vice Admiral Jisaburō Ozawa's Second Expeditionary Fleet. Yura, accompanied by the destroyers Ayanami, Yūgiri, Asagiri, and Shiokaze, departed Mergui and steamed into the Bay of Bengal with the cruisers Chōkai and Suzuya, Kumano, Mikuma and Mogami and the light carrier Ryūjō to attack Allied merchant shipping. On 6 April 1942, 14 miles (23 km) east of Kalingapatnam in the Bay of Bengal Yura and Yūgiri sank the Dutch merchant vessel Batavia en route from Calcutta to Karachi. Yura and Yūgiri also sank the Dutch motorship Banjoewangi and the British steamer Taksang. At the end of April, Yura returned to Sasebo Naval Arsenal for a refit.

=== Battle of Midway ===
On 10 May 1942, Yura was made flagship of Rear Admiral Shōji Nishimura's 4th Destroyer Squadron. At the Battle of Midway, the squadron also included Captain Ranji Oe's 3rd Destroyer Division of 4 destroyers and Captain Yasuo Satō's 9th Destroyer Division of 3 destroyers. The 4th Destroyer Squadron was under the overall command of Vice Admiral Nobutake Kondō, but did not see combat at Midway.

=== Solomon Islands Campaigns ===
On 7 August 1942 the United States began "Operation Watchtower" to retake Guadalcanal and the Solomon Islands. Yura was dispatched to Truk with Vice Admiral Kondō's IJN Second Fleet to begin reinforcement operations, and was thus at the Battle of the Eastern Solomons on 24 August 1942. Although the light carrier Ryūjō was sunk and Chitose was damaged, Yura emerged unscathed, and returned to Truk on 5 September 1942. For the remainder of September 1942, Yura patrolled between Truk, Guadalcanal and the Shortland Islands. On 25 September 1942, while at Shortland, she was attacked by two Boeing B-17 Flying Fortress bombers of the USAAF 11th Bomb Group based at Espiritu Santo and was slightly damaged.

On 11 October 1942, the submarine USS Sculpin claimed a torpedo hit forward of Yura's bridge that inflicted minor damage, but postwar analysis failed to confirm this attack and Yura was apparently not damaged this day. On 12 October 1942, Yura departed Shortland to escort the seaplane tender Nisshin and Chitose returning from a transport run from Guadalcanal, and on 14 October 1942, Yura assisted in landing 1,100 troops on Cape Esperance, Guadalcanal. Another "Tokyo Express" troop transport run to Guadalcanal was made on 17 October 1942 to carry 2,100 troops, field artillery pieces and anti-tank guns. On 18 October 1942, en route back to Shortland, Yura was attacked by the submarine USS Grampus off Choiseul Island. Grampus fired four Mark 14 Torpedoes at Yura. One hit but did not explode, and Yura departed the area with a dent in her port side.

On 24 October 1942, Yura departed Shortland to bombard Guadalcanal with the No. 2 Attack Unit consisting of Rear Admiral Tamotsu Takama's flagship Akizuki, Harusame, Murasame and Yūdachi. At the north entrance to Indispensable Strait, off Guadalcanal, on 25 October 1942 (the day before the Battle of the Santa Cruz Islands), Yura, leading an attack group of destroyers off Santa Isabel Island in the Solomons was attacked by five SBD Dauntless dive-bombers of VS-71 and hit aft by two bombs near the engine room. She flooded and settled by the stern. After receiving reports of the attack, Vice Admiral Mikawa, CINC, IJN Eighth Fleet, cancelled Rear Admiral Takama's bombardment mission. The No. 2 Attack Unit reversed course back towards Shortland. On the way back, Yura was attacked again by three USAAF P-39 Airacobras and by four Marine SBDs, but these attacks failed to cause any additional damage. Captain Shiro Sato attempted to beach Yura but she was attacked again by four SBDs, three F4F Wildcats and four P-39s. Soon afterwards, Yura was attacked again by six USAAF B-17 Flying Fortress bombers from Espiritu Santo. These attacks reignited Yura's fires. At 18:30, after her crew was taken off, Japanese destroyers Harusame and Yūdachi scuttled Yura with torpedoes. She broke in two and her forward portion sank. At 19:00, her stern portion was sunk by gunfire from Yudachi at 08°15′S 159°57′E. Yura was removed from the navy list on 20 November 1942.

== Bibliography ==
- Brown, David (1990). Warship Losses of World War Two. Annapolis, Maryland: Naval Institute Press. ISBN 1-55750-914-X.
- Dull, Paul S. (1978). A Battle History of the Imperial Japanese Navy, 1941-1945. Annapolis, Maryland: Naval Institute Press. ISBN 0-87021-097-1.
- Friedman, Norman (1985). "Japan". In Gardiner, Robert & Gray, Randal (eds.). Conway's All the World's Fighting Ships 1906–1921. Annapolis, Maryland: Naval Institute Press. ISBN 0-87021-907-3.
- Hackett, Bob & Kingsepp, Sander (2012). "IJN Yura: Tabular Record of Movement". CombinedFleet.com.
- Jentschura, Hansgeorg; Jung, Dieter & Mickel, Peter (1977). Warships of the Imperial Japanese Navy, 1869–1945. Annapolis, Maryland: United States Naval Institute. ISBN 978-0-87021-893-4.
- Jordan, Donald A. (2001). China's Trial by Fire: The Shanghai War of 1932. Ann Arbor, Michigan: University of Michigan Press. ISBN 0-472-11165-5.
- Konstam, Angus (2021). Sinking Force Z 1941: The Day the Imperial Japanese Navy Killed the Battleship. Air Campaign. Oxford: Osprey Publishing. ISBN 978-1-47284-660-0.
- Lacroix, Eric & Wells II, Linton (1997). Japanese Cruisers of the Pacific War. Annapolis, Maryland: Naval Institute Press. ISBN 0-87021-311-3.
- Piegzik, Mikhal A. (2022). The Darkest Hour: Volume 1: The Japanese Naval Offensive in the Indian Ocean 1942 – The Opening Moves. Asia@War. Vol. 31. Warwick, UK: Helion. ISBN 978-1-915070-61-6.
- Piegzik, Mikhal A. (2022). The Darkest Hour: Volume 2: The Japanese Naval Offensive in the Indian Ocean 1942 – The Attack Against Ceylon and the Eastern Fleet. Asia@War. Vol. 33. Warwick, UK: Helion. ISBN 978-1-804510-23-0.
- Remmelink, Willem Gerrit Jan, ed. (2018). The Operations of the Navy in the Dutch East Indies and the Bay of Bengal. Senshi Sōsho. Vol. 26. Leiden, Netherlands: Leiden University Press. ISBN 978-9-087282-80-6.
- Rohwer, Jürgen (2005). Chronology of the War at Sea 1939–1945: The Naval History of World War Two (Third Revised ed.). Annapolis, Maryland: Naval Institute Press. ISBN 1-59114-119-2.
- Stille, Mark (2012). Imperial Japanese Navy Light Cruisers 1941-45. New Vanguard. Vol. 187. Botley, UK: Osprey Publishing. ISBN 978-1-84908-562-5.
- Whitley, M. J. (1995). Cruisers of World War Two: An International Encyclopedia. Annapolis, Maryland: Naval Institute Press. ISBN 1-55750-141-6.
