= USS Tautog (SS-199) =

Tambor-class submarine of the US Navy

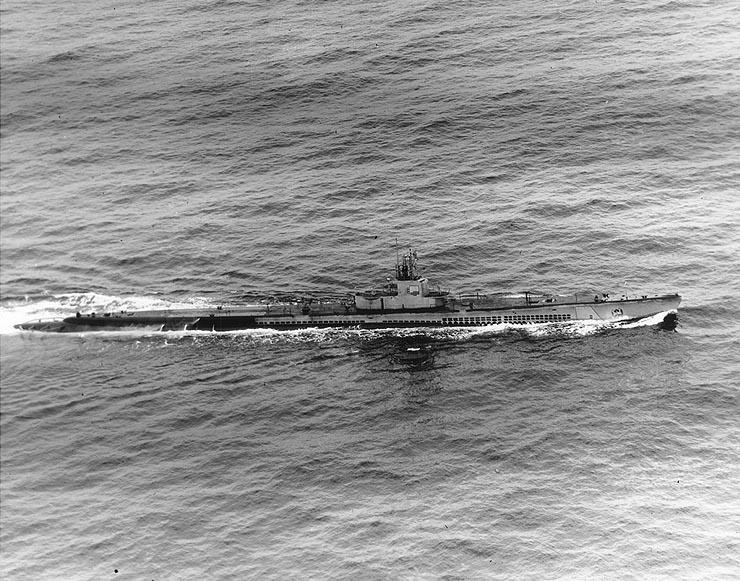
- USS Tautog (SS-199) on 29 May 1945

History

United States
- Builder: Electric Boat Company, Groton, Connecticut
- Laid down: 1 March 1939
- Launched: 27 January 1940
- Commissioned: 3 July 1940
- Decommissioned: 8 December 1945
- Stricken: 1 September 1959
- Honors and awards: 14 battle stars, Navy Unit Commendation
- Fate: Sold for scrap, 1 July 1960

General characteristics
- Class & type: Tambor class diesel-electric submarine
- Displacement: 1,475 long tons (1,499 t) standard, surfaced; 2,370 tons (2,408 t) submerged
- Length: 307 ft 2 in (93.62 m)
- Beam: 27 ft 3 in (8.31 m)
- Draft: 14 ft 7 1/2 in (4.458 m)
- Propulsion: 4 × General Motors Model 16-248 V16 Diesel engines driving electric generators; 2 × 126-cell Sargo batteries; 4 × high-speed General Electric electric motors with reduction gears; two propellers; 5,400 shp (4.0 MW) surfaced; 2,740 shp (2.0 MW) submerged
- Speed: 20.4 knots (38 km/h) surfaced; 8.75 knots (16 km/h) submerged
- Range: 11,000 nautical miles (20,000 km) at 10 knots (19 km/h)
- Endurance: 48 hours at 2 knots (3.7 km/h) submerged
- Test depth: 250 to 300 ft (76 to 91 m) Crush Depth 500 ft (150 m)
- Complement: 6 officers, 54 enlisted
- Armament: 10 × 21-inch (533 mm) torpedo tubes; 6 forward, 4 aft; 24 torpedoes; 1 × 3-inch (76 mm) / 50 caliber deck gun; Bofors 40 mm and Oerlikon 20 mm cannon

USS Tautog (SS-199), the second Tambor-class submarine, was the first ship of the United States Navy to be named for the tautog, a small edible sport fish, which is also called a blackfish. She was one of the most successful submarines of World War II. Tautog was credited with sinking 26 Japanese ships, for a total of 72,606 tons, scoring second by number of ships and eleventh by tonnage earning her the nickname "The Terrible T." Of the twelve Tambor-class submarines, she was one of only five to survive the war.

Tautog's first patrol, into the Marshall Islands in late 1941 and early 1942, produced reconnaissance information but no enemy vessels sunk. However, on her second visit to that area, in the spring of 1942, she torpedoed the Japanese submarines Ro-30 and I-28, plus a freighter. Operating out of Australia between July 1942 and May 1943, Tautog went into the waters of the East Indies and Indochina on five patrols during which Tautog sank the Japanese destroyer Isonami and seven merchant ships. She also laid mines off Haiphong and endured a depth charge attack in November 1942.

Following an overhaul at San Francisco, California, Tautog resumed operations from Pearl Harbor in October 1943, sinking the Japanese submarine chaser No. 30 and damaging a tanker and three freighters during this cruise, her eighth of the war. Her next four patrols, from December 1943 to August 1944, took her to the Japanese home islands, including the frigid northern Pacific. This period was a very productive one, with the destroyer Shirakumo and eleven Japanese merchant ships falling victim to Tautog. A stateside overhaul followed, with the submarine's thirteenth war patrol, into the East China Sea, beginning in December 1944. The next month she sank a landing ship and a motor torpedo boat tender to conclude the submarine's combat career.

Assigned to training duty in February 1945, Tautog spent the rest of World War II in that role and supporting developmental work off Hawaii and the West Coast. She transferred to the Atlantic in November 1945, a few months after Japan's surrender, and was decommissioned in December. In 1947 Tautog went to the Great Lakes, where she was employed as a stationary Naval Reserve training submarine at Milwaukee, Wisconsin, for nearly twelve years. Tautog was removed from service in September 1959. Sold some months later, she was scrapped at Manistee, Michigan, during the early 1960s.

== Construction and commissioning ==
The submarine's keel was laid down on 1 March 1939 at Groton, Connecticut, by the Electric Boat Company. She was launched on 27 January 1940 and was sponsored by Mrs. Hallie N Edwards, wife of Captain Richard S. Edwards, Commander Submarine Squadron Two. The boat was commissioned on 3 July 1940.

== 1940–1941 ==
Following a short training period in Long Island Sound, Tautog departed for the Caribbean Sea on her shakedown cruise which lasted from 6 September 1940 to 11 November 1940. She returned to New London, Connecticut and operated from that base until early February 1941 when she was ordered to the Virgin Islands.

Late in April, she returned to New London, Connecticut, loaded supplies, and sailed with two other submarines for Hawaii on 1 May. After calls at Coco Solo, in the Panama Canal Zone, and San Diego, California, they arrived at Pearl Harbor on 6 June 1941. Tautog operated in the Hawaiian area until mid-October. On 21 October, she and USS Thresher stood out to sea, under sealed orders, to begin a 45-day, full-time, simulated war patrol in the area around Midway Island. For 38 consecutive days, the two submarines operated submerged for 16 to 18 hours each day. Tautog returned to Pearl Harbor on 5 December 1941.

Two days later, on Sunday, 7 December, Tautog was at the submarine base when the Japanese attacked Pearl Harbor. Shortly after the attack began on Ford Island, Tautog's gun crews, with the help of Narwhal and a destroyer, shot down a Japanese torpedo bomber as it came over Merry Point.

=== First patrol ===
Tautog's first war patrol began on 26 December 1941 and took her to the Marshall Islands for reconnaissance work. After 26 days in the area gathering information, particularly of Kwajalein, she reported no enemy activity at Rongelop, Bat, Wotho, or Bikini. On 13 January 1942, she launched three torpedoes at a small minelayer, receiving a depth charging in return. Plagued by a fogging periscope, she returned to Pearl Harbor on 4 February and was routed to Mare Island for upkeep.

=== Second patrol ===
On 9 April 1942, Tautog headed westward toward Hawaii and started her next war patrol upon leaving Pearl Harbor 15 days later. Her assigned area was again in the Marshall Islands. Around 10:00 on 26 April near Johnston Island, while en route to her station, Tautog sighted the periscope of an enemy submarine, apparently maneuvering to reach a favorable firing position. Tautog made a sharp turn and fired one stern torpedo, evidently exploding above the target, and was officially credited as sinking Ro-30 (1,047 tons). However, Ro-30 had been in 4th Reserve since December 1938 and was converted into a training hulk on 1 April 1942. She survived the war at the Ōtake submarine school and was subsequently scrapped. Fitzsimons does not confirm sinking Ro-30, the Japanese report no submarines going missing around April 1942 in any theater, and as of 2024 the only confirmed occasion of one submarine sinking another in wartime while both were submerged is HMS Venturer sinking U-864.

Shortly after her arrival in the Marshalls, Tautog was ordered to Truk to intercept ships returning from the Battle of the Coral Sea, especially the Japanese aircraft carriers Zuikauku and Shōkaku (the latter codenamed "Wounded Bear"); because Pearl Harbor underestimated Shōkaku's speed, Tautog and two compatriots arrived too late and did not see Shōkaku depart, on 11 or 12 May. South of the harbor, Tautog launched two torpedoes at Goyo Maru, scoring one hit and suffering a circular run (typical of the erratic Mark XIV torpedo), forcing Tautog deep. (Goyo Maru beached herself.) Two days later, Tautog was alerted by ULTRA of four Japanese submarines in the vicinity, also returning from battle. She was caught by surprise by the first, and failed to attack. She detected and fired two torpeodes at the second. Although the Japanese boat was not in sight when Tautog surfaced, she was not officially credited with a sinking. Later in the morning, Tautog sighted another submarine with the designation "I-28" clearly discernible on its conning tower. Just as I-28 fired at Tautog, the American boat launched two torpedoes, then went to 150 feet (46 m) to avoid. One torpedo missed, the second sent the Japanese boat to the bottom, making her the third sunk by Pacific Fleet submarines.

Tautog sighted two ships departing Truk on 22 May and made a submerged sound attack on the larger. The American submarine's crew thought they had sunk the target, but the 5,461-ton cargo ship Sanko Maru had been only damaged. Three days later, Tautog made an attack from periscope depth against a cargo ship. Her spread of torpedoes sent Shoka Maru to the bottom. The patrol ended at Fremantle on 11 June. She was credited with six ships sunk for 19,500 tons; postwar, this was reduced to three for 7,500 tons.

=== Third patrol ===
Her third war patrol, conducted from 17 July to 10 September 1942, took Tautog to the coast of Indochina, where (in part due to torpedo shortages) she laid mines. The hunting was poor, and she sank only one ship, Ohio Maru (5,900 tons), on 6 August.

=== Fourth patrol ===
Tautog was refitted by Holland (AS-3) at Albany, south of Fremantle. Again loaded with mines, the submarine put to sea 8 October 1942. On 20 October, her lookouts spotted the dim outline of a ship through a rain squall. Quickly submerging, the submarine determined that the ship was a 75-ton fishing schooner. Tautog prepared for battle, surfaced, closed the range, and fired a shot from her deck gun across the schooner's bow; the target hove to. The stranger broke the Japanese colors and hoisted a signal flag. Investigation revealed a Japanese crew and four Filipinos on board. The Filipinos swam over to the submarine and later enlisted in the United States Navy. The Japanese were ordered to take to their boats but refused to do so. Three shells fired in the schooner's stern disabled her rudder and propeller. The Japanese then launched a boat, were given water, and directed to the nearest land. When Tautog opened fire to sink the ship, several more Japanese emerged and scrambled into the boat. Ten more rounds left the schooner a burning hulk.

On 27 October, Tautog tracked a passenger-cargo ship until dark and launched two torpedoes into her. A fire started in the target aft, her bow rose into the air, and the unidentified ship sank within a few minutes (tentatively identified as the Hokuango Maru formerly Chinese vessel Pei An ) The next day, a spread of torpedoes fired at another merchantman turned out to be duds; their impacts on the target which could be heard in the sub. However, escort ships had seen their tracks, and the submarine received a thorough depth charging which caused no serious damage. During the night of 2 November, Tautog laid mines off Haiphong, Indochina, with several exploding as they were emplaced. On 11 November, she launched a torpedo at another passenger/cargo ship. It missed and alerted an escort which gave Tautog a severe depth charge attack. Five explosions close aboard caused extensive minor damage. The submarine returned to Fremantle ten days later for repair and refit. She was credited with one ship of 5,100 tons; postwar, it was reduced to 4,000 tons.

=== Fifth patrol ===
Her fifth war patrol, from 15 December 1942 to 30 January 1943, took Tautog to the Java Sea, near Ambon Island, Timor Island, and Celebes Island. She contacted a freighter in Ombai Strait on 24 December and tracked her until 03:06 the next morning when she fired three stern tubes. Two hits sent Banshu Maru Number 2 to the bottom. Tautog went deep and began retiring westward; enemy patrol boats kept her down for ten hours before they withdrew.

That night, Tautog was headed for Alors Strait when she sighted a ship (thought to be a freighter) coming west, accompanied by an escort. The targets suddenly turned toward Tautog and were recognized as an antisubmarine warfare team. The submarine went deep but still received a severe pounding. On 5 January 1943, Tautog sighted a sail off her port bow and promptly closed the ship. It turned out to be a native craft with a dozen Muslim sailors, four women, several babies, some chickens, and a goat on board. After he had examined the ship's papers, Tautog's commanding officer, William B. Sieglaff, allowed the vessel to resume its voyage. On 9 January at 08:38, Tautog (relying on ULTRA) sighted Natori, a Nagara-class cruiser off Ambon Island, at a range of about 3,000 yards (2,700 m). Three minutes later, the submarine fired her first torpedo. At 09:43, her crew heard a loud explosion, and sonar reported the cruiser's screws had stopped. In the next few minutes, as the cruiser got underway at reduced speed, Tautog scored two more hits, while the cruiser opened fire on her periscope with 5 in (127 mm) guns, preventing her from tracking the target for another attack; the cruiser limped into Ambon.

Later in the patrol, in the Salajar Strait, Tautog spotted a second cruiser (again thanks to ULTRA), and launched four torpedoes in heavy seas; all missed. She sighted a freighter on 22 January in the Banda Sea, and three of the submarine's torpedoes sent her to the bottom. The victim was later identified as Hasshu Maru, a former Dutch passenger-cargo ship which had been taken over by the Japanese. Tautog then headed for Fremantle, where she was greeted warmly for her "extreme aggressiveness." She was credited with two ships sunk for 6,900 tons; postwar, this was limited to two of 2,900.

=== Sixth patrol ===
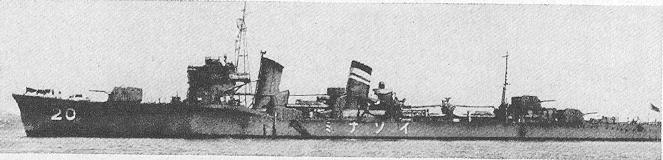
Isonami, sunk by Tautog 9 April 1943.

Tautog's next patrol was conducted in Makassar Strait and around Balikpapan (where she again laid mines) from 24 February 1943 to 19 April. On 17 March, she sighted a grounded tanker with topside damage from an air attack. One torpedo, well placed near the stern, produced a secondary explosion, and the ship settled by the stern. Tautog expended three additional torpedoes on a freighter, but missed. On 9 April in the Celebes Sea off Boston Island, Tautog contacted a convoy of five ships. She sank the 5,214-ton freighter Penang Maru with three torpedoes, then the destroyer Isonami (1,750 tons) as it rescued crew from the Penang Maru with three more and missed with three. During this patrol, in four battle surfaces to test her new gun (only the third 5"/25 cal pirated from an old V-boat,) Tautog also sank a schooner, a sailboat, and a motor sampan. Despite five torpedo and four gun attacks, however, she only sank two confirmed ships for 7,000 tons (wartime, 6,800).

=== Seventh patrol ===
Tautog stood out of Fremantle on 11 May 1943 and headed for a patrol area that included the Flores Sea, the Gulf of Boni, the Molucca Sea, the Celebes Sea, and the Moru Gulf. On 20 May, she sank a sampan with her deck guns. On 6 June, the submarine fired a spread of three torpedoes at a cargo ship off the entrance to Basalin Strait. The first torpedo scored a hit 20 seconds after being fired and a yellowish-green flash went up amidships of Shinei Maru as she went down. Tautog sank the 4,474-ton cargo ship Meiten Maru on 20 June, prior to ending her 53-day patrol at Pearl Harbor. This patrol was no more successful; despite six torpedo and three gun attacks, she only sank two confirmed ships for 14,300 tons (reduced to 5,300 tons postwar). The submarine was then routed back to the United States for an overhaul at Hunter's Point Navy Yard. She held refresher training when the yard work was completed and got underway for Hawaii.

=== Eighth patrol ===
On 7 October 1943, Tautog departed Pearl Harbor to patrol in waters near the Palau Islands. On 22 October, she surfaced near Fais Island to shell a phosphate plant. She sank Submarine Chaser Number 30 on 4 November. and subsequently damaged a tanker and three cargo ships. With all torpedoes expended, Tautog tracked a convoy for two days while radioing its position back to Pearl Harbor before she returned to Midway Island on 18 November.

=== Ninth patrol ===
Tautog's ninth war patrol began on 12 December 1943 and took her to Japanese home waters, southeast of Shikoku Island and along the southern coast of Honshū. On 27 December, she fired a spread of three torpedoes at a freighter and made a similar attack on a passenger ship. However, she never learned the results of these attacks since enemy escorts forced her to go deep and kept her down for four hours while they rained 99 depth charges on her. On 3 January 1944, Tautog tracked a cargo ship off the mouth of the Kumano Kawa River, approximately one-half mile from the seawall. She fired a spread of three torpedoes, turned, and headed for deep water. The submarine ran up her periscope, but an explosion filled the air with debris and obscured Saishu Maru from view as the freighter sank. The sound of approaching high-speed propellers and a closing patrol plane convinced the submarine that it was time to depart.

The next day, Tautog made radar contact with a ship and tracked the target while working toward a good firing position. A profligate spread of six torpedoes produced four hits which broke Usa Maru in half. When last seen, the cargoman's bow and stern were both in the air. On 11 January, Tautog intercepted two freighters and launched three torpedoes at the first and larger, and one at the second. Escorts forced the submarine deep, but timed explosions indicated a hit on each ship. Tautog was later credited with inflicting medium damage to Kogyo Maru. She returned to Pearl Harbor for a refit by Bushnell (AS-15) on 30 January, credited with two ships for 9,700 tons (postwar, 6,000).

=== Tenth patrol ===
Tautog's assignment for her tenth war patrol took her to the cold waters of the northern Pacific near the Kuril Islands, from Paramushiro south to the main islands of Japan and the northeast coast of Hokkaidō. The submarine topped off with fuel at Midway and entered her patrol area on 5 March 1944. Her only casualty of the war occurred that day. While several members of her crew were doing emergency work on deck, a giant wave knocked them all off their feet and swept one man, newly assigned Motor Machinist's Mate R. A. Laramee, overboard; a search for him proved fruitless.

On 13 March, Tautog tracked a freighter until she reached a good position for an attack and then launched three torpedoes from 1,500 yards (1,400 m), of which two hit and stopped Ryua Maru. The target refused to sink, even after Tautog fired four more torpedoes into "the rubber ship". To avoid wasting more precious torpedoes, the submarine surfaced and finished the job with her 5" gun. While she was attempting this, another ship came over the horizon to rescue survivors. Leaving the bait sitting, Tautog dived and began a submerged approach, firing a spread of three torpedoes; cargo ship Shojen Maru sank, more quickly than her inexplicably durable sister. As the sub headed homeward on the night of 16 March, Tautog made radar contact on a convoy of seven ships off Hokkaidō. She maneuvered into position off the enemy's starboard flank so that two ships were almost overlapping and launched four torpedoes. After watching the first one explode against the nearer ship, Tautog was forced deep by an escort, but heard two timed explosions and breaking-up noises accompanied by more explosions. The American submarine pursued the remaining ships and attacked again from their starboard flank, firing three torpedoes at a medium-sized freighter and four at another ship. A Japanese destroyer closed the submarine, forced her deep, and subjected her to a depth charge attack for one and one-half hours. Tautog was officially credited with sinking Shirakumo (1,750 tons) and the passenger/cargo ship Nichiren Maru, bringing her total for the patrol to five ships for 17,700 tons (reduced postwar to four for 11,300), one of the most aggressive, and successful, of the war. She returned to Midway on 23 March.

=== Eleventh patrol ===
During her next patrol, from 17 April to 21 May 1944, Tautog returned to the Kuril Islands. On 2 May, she sighted a cargo ship in a small harbor between Banjo To and Matsuwa To. The submarine launched four torpedoes from a range of 2,000 yards (1,800 m). One hit obscured the target. An hour later, Tautog fired two more and scored another hit. The 5,973-ton Army cargo ship Ryōyō Maru settled in 24 feet (7.3 m) of water, decks awash. The next morning, Tautog made radar contact in a heavy fog, closing the enemy ship and firing four torpedoes; two hit the target. The submarine circled for a follow-up shot, but this was difficult as the water was covered with gasoline drums, debris, and life rafts. When Tautog last saw Fushimi Maru (5,000 tons) through the fog, her bow was in the air. On 8 May, amid "swarms of ships" the submarine contacted a convoy bound for Esan Saki. She fired torpedoes at the largest ship. One hit slowed the target, and two more torpedoes left Miyazaki Maru (4,000 tons) sinking by the stern. Escorts forced Tautog deep and depth charged her for seven hours without doing any damage. At dawn on 9 May, she fired on another freighter, missing. Three days later, the submarine fired her last three torpedoes at Banei Maru Number 2 (1,100 tons) and watched her disappear in a cloud of smoke. When Tautog returned to Pearl Harbor, she was credited with four ships sunk for 20,500 tons (postwar reduced to 16,100).

=== Twelfth patrol ===
On 23 June 1944, Tautog departed Pearl Harbor for Japanese waters to patrol the east coasts of Honshū and Hokkaidō. On 8 July, she stopped a small freighter dead in the water with one spread of torpedoes and followed with another spread that sank the ship. A lone survivor, taken on board the submarine, identified the ship as Matsu Maru which was transporting a load of lumber from Tokyo to Muroran. The next day, Tautog was patrolling on the surface near Simusu Shima, when she sighted a ship coming over the horizon. She submerged, closed the range, identified the ship as a coastal steamer. Surfacing, the sub fired 21 5" shells into the target, starting a fire and causing an explosion that blew off the target's stern. She then rescued six survivors from a swamped lifeboat who identified their ship as the Hokoriu Maru, en route from the Bonin Islands to Tokyo laden with coconut oil.

On 2 August, Tautog sighted several ships off Miki Saki. She launched three torpedoes at a freighter from a range of 800 yards (730 m). The first hit caused a secondary explosion which obscured the target, and the second raised a column of black smoke. When the air cleared, the cargo ship Konei Maru had sunk. The submarine was briefly attacked by escorts but evaded them and set her course for Midway. Tautog arrived there on 10 August, credited with a disappointing two ships for 4,300 tons (postwar reduced to 2,800); she was routed to the United States for overhaul.

=== Thirteenth patrol ===
Tautog was back in Pearl Harbor in early December and, on 17 December 1944, began her 13th and last war patrol. She called at Midway and Saipan before taking her patrol station (in company with Silversides) in the East China Sea. On 17 January 1945, Tautog sighted a ship heading toward her. She attained a position and fired a spread of three torpedoes. One hit blew off the enemy's bow. She fired another torpedo from a range of 700 yards (640 m); and the loaded troopship, Transport Number 15, disintegrated. The bright moonlight of 20 January disclosed an enemy ship at a range of 10,000 yards (9,100 m). Tautog maneuvered to silhouette the target against the moon and attacked with two torpedoes and then watched the ship sink. The submarine approached the wreckage and rescued one survivor who identified the ship as the motor torpedo boat tender Shuri Maru (1,800 tons), en route from Tsingtao to Sasebo. The next day, Tautog damaged a tanker but could not evaluate the damage as she had to evade enemy escorts that were approaching. On her way back to Midway Island, the submarine sank a wooden trawler with her deck guns. Her score for the patrol was three ships for 8,500 tons (postwar, two for 3,300).

Tautog completed her patrol at Midway on 1 February 1945 and was assigned to training duty. On 2 March, the submarine shifted her operations to Pearl Harbor to assist aircraft in anti-submarine warfare for one month before heading for the United States. She reached San Diego on 9 April and operated in conjunction with the University of California's Department of War Research in experimenting with new equipment which it had developed to improve submarine safety. On 7 September, she headed for San Francisco to join the Pacific Reserve Fleet. Her orders were subsequently modified, and she got underway on 31 October for the East Coast. Tautog arrived at Portsmouth, New Hampshire, on 18 November and was decommissioned on 8 December 1945.

== Fate ==
Plans to use Tautog as a target during atomic bomb tests at Bikini Atoll in 1946 were cancelled, and she was assigned to the Ninth Naval District on 9 May 1947 as a reserve training ship. The submarine was towed to Wisconsin and arrived at Milwaukee on 26 December 1947. She provided immobile service at the Great Lakes Naval Reserve Training Center for the next decade.

Tautog was placed out of service and stricken from the Naval Vessel Register on 11 September 1959. On 15 November 1959, she was sold to the Bultema Dock and Dredge Company of Manistee, Michigan, for scrap.

== Summary of raiding history ==
Date	Ship name	Ship type	Tonnage	Fate
12 May 1942	Goyo Maru	Cargo ship	8,467	Destroyed
17 May 1942	I-28	Submarine	3,713	Sunk
22 May 1942	Sanko Maru	Cargo ship	5,461	Damaged
25 May 1942	Shoka Maru	Cargo ship	7,500	Sunk
6 August 1942	Ohio Maru	Cargo ship	5,900	Sunk
20 October 1942	N/A	Schooner	75	Sunk
27 October 1942	Hokuango Maru	Cargo ship	3,585	Sunk
24 December 1942	Banshu Maru	Supply ship	988	Sunk
9 January 1943	Natori	Light cruiser	5,088	Damaged
22 January 1943	Hasshu Maru	Cargo ship	2,900	Sunk
10 March 1943	N/A	Sampan	N/A	Sunk
11 March 1943	N/A	Sailship	N/A	Sunk
18 March 1943	N/A	Schooner	N/A	Sunk
9 April 1943	Penang Maru	Cargo ship	5,214	Sunk
9 April 1943	Isonami	Destroyer	2,080	Sunk
20 May 1943	N/A	Sampan	N/A	Sunk
6 June 1943	Shinei Maru	Cargo ship	973	Sunk
20 June 1943	Meiten Maru	Cargo ship	4,474	Sunk
4 November 1943	No 30	Submarine chaser	420	sunk
3 January 1944	Saishu Maru	Cargo ship	9,343	Sunk
11 January 1944	Kogyo Maru	Cargo ship	6,353	Sunk
13 March 1944	Ryua Maru	Cargo ship	1,915	Sunk
13 March 1944	Shojen Maru	Cargo ship	1,942	Sunk
16 March 1944	Nichiren Maru	Cargo ship	5,460	Sunk
16 March 1944	Shirakumo	Destroyer	2,080	Sunk
2 May 1944	Ryōyō Maru	Cargo ship	5,973	Sunk
2 May 1944	Fushimi Maru	Cargo ship	5,000	Sunk
8 May 1944	Miyazaki Maru	Cargo ship	4,000	Sunk
12 May 1944	Banei Maru	Cargo ship	1,100	Sunk
8 July 1944	Matsu Maru	Cargo ship	888	Sunk
9 July 1944	Hokorui Maru	Cargo ship	N/A	Sunk
2 August 1944	Konei Maru	Cargo ship	2,800	Sunk
17 January 1945	Transport No 15	Cargo ship	1,829	Sunk
20 January 1945	Shuri Maru	Motor torpedo boat tender	1,857	Sunk
21 Januar 1945	Naga Maru #11	Trawler	43	Sunk

== Awards ==
- Navy Unit Commendation for a combined seven war patrols
- American Defense Service Medal with "FLEET" clasp
- Asiatic-Pacific Campaign Medal with 14 battle stars
- World War II Victory Medal
