= Ryōyō Maru (1930) =

Japanese ship

History
- Name: Ryōyō Maru
- Owner: Toyo Kisen Kabushiki Kaisha (1931–??); Imperial Japanese Army (??–1944)
- Builder: Kawasaki Dockyard Company, Kobe
- Laid down: 3 March 1930
- Launched: 25 September 1930
- Commissioned: 15 January 1931
- Fate: Sunk 2 May 1944

General characteristics
- Tonnage: 5,974 GRT
- Length: 415 ft (126 m)
- Beam: 56 ft (17 m)
- Draught: 31.8 ft (9.7 m)

Ryōyō Maru (良洋丸) was a 5,974-gross register ton passenger ship that was built by Kawasaki Dockyard Company, Kobe, for Tōyō Kisen Kabushiki Kaisha. The ship was launched in 1930. She was requisitioned by the Imperial Japanese Army and fitted out as a fast troop transport and sunk on 2 May 1945 after being torpedoed.

== Military service ==
Ryoto Maru was requisitioned by the Imperial Japanese Army and fitted out as a fast troop transport. She was part of the invasion fleet that landed troops during the invasion of Ambon on 30 January 1942, and part of the invasion fleet at Buna-Gona.

On 4 March 1944, she was damaged when struck by a large wave and driven aground off Matsuwa Jima, in the Kuril Islands. Ryōyō Maru was anchored in a harbour along the Kuril Islands, when she was struck by a torpedo from USS Tautog on 2 May. She settled in 24 feet (7.3 m) of water, decks awash at 48°04′N 153°16′E.

== See also ==
- Kawasaki Shipbuilding Corporation
- Imperial Japanese Army Railways and Shipping Section
