= Japanese destroyer Isonami (1927) =

Fubuki-class destroyer

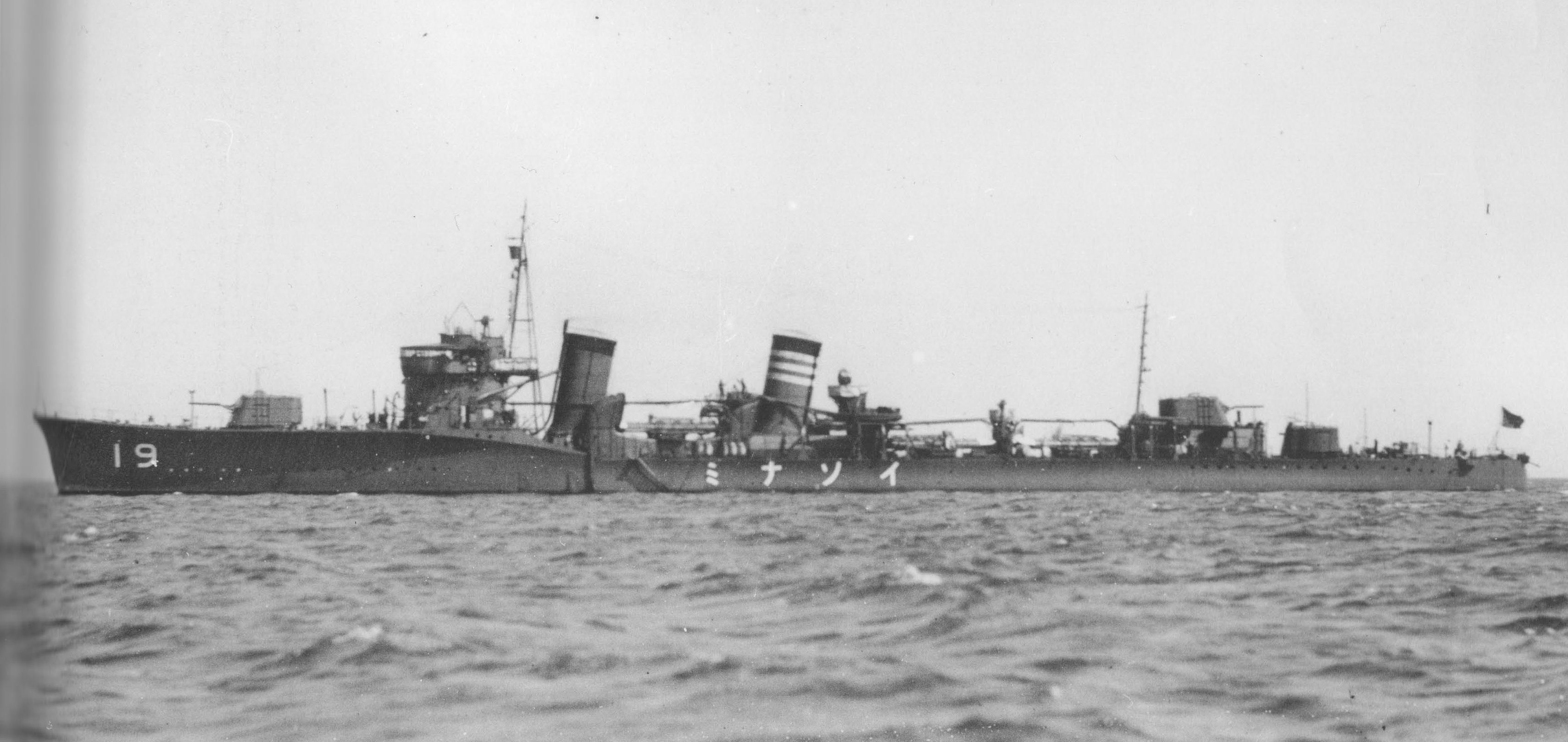
- Isonami in 1939.

History

Empire of Japan
- Name: Isonami
- Namesake: Japanese destroyer Isonami (1908)
- Ordered: 1923 Fiscal Year
- Builder: Uraga Dock Company
- Yard number: Destroyer No. 43
- Laid down: 19 October 1926
- Launched: 24 November 1927
- Commissioned: 30 June 1928
- Stricken: 1 August 1943
- Fate: Torpedoed and sunk, 9 April 1943

General characteristics
- Class & type: Fubuki-class destroyer
- Displacement: 1,750 long tons (1,780 t) standard; 2,050 long tons (2,080 t) re-built
- Length: 111.96 m (367.3 ft) pp; 115.3 m (378 ft) waterline; 118.41 m (388.5 ft) overall
- Beam: 10.4 m (34 ft 1 in)
- Draft: 3.2 m (10 ft 6 in)
- Propulsion: 4 × Kampon type boilers; 2 × Kampon Type Ro geared turbines; 2 × shafts at 50,000 ihp (37,000 kW)
- Speed: 38 knots (44 mph; 70 km/h)
- Range: 5,000 nmi (9,300 km) at 14 knots (26 km/h)
- Complement: 219
- Armament: 6 × Type 3 127 mm 50 caliber naval guns (3×2); up to 22 × Type 96 25 mm AT/AA Guns; up to 10 × 13 mm AA guns; 9 × 610 mm (24 in) torpedo tubes; 36 × depth charges

Service record
- Operations: Second Sino-Japanese War; Battle of Malaya; Battle of Kota Bharu; Battle of Midway; Indian Ocean raid; Solomon Islands campaign

Isonami (磯波, "Breakers" or "Surf") was the ninth of twenty-four Fubuki-class destroyers, built for the Imperial Japanese Navy following World War I.

== History ==
Construction of the advanced Fubuki-class destroyers was authorized as part of the Imperial Japanese Navy's expansion program from fiscal 1923, intended to give Japan a qualitative edge with the world's most modern ships. The Fubuki class had performance that was a quantum leap over previous destroyer designs, so much so that they were designated Special Type destroyers (特型, Tokugata). The large size, powerful engines, high speed, large radius of action and unprecedented armament gave these destroyers the firepower similar to many light cruisers in other navies. Isonami, built at the Uraga Dock Company was laid down on 19 October 1926, launched on 24 November 1927 and commissioned on 30 June 1928. Originally assigned hull designation “Destroyer No. 43”, she was completed as Isonami.

== Operational history ==
On completion, Isonami, along with her sister ships, Uranami, Shikinami, and Ayanami, were assigned to Destroyer Division 19 under the IJN 2nd Fleet. During the Second Sino-Japanese War, from 1937, Isonami covered landing of Japanese forces in Shanghai and Hangzhou. From 1940, she was assigned to patrol and cover landings of Japanese forces in south China.

=== World War II history ===
At the time of the attack on Pearl Harbor, Isonami was assigned to Destroyer Division 19 of Desron 3 of the IJN 1st Fleet, and had deployed from Kure Naval District to the port of Samah on Hainan Island. From 4 December 1941 to 30 January 1942 Isonami was part of the escort for the heavy cruisers Suzuya, Kumano, Mogami, and Mikuma out of Samah and Camranh Bay, French Indochina in support of Malaya, Banka-Palembang and Anambas Islands invasion operations. On 27 February, Isonami was assigned to "Operation J" (the invasion of Java), and "Operation T" (the invasion of northern Sumatra) on 12 March and the "Operation D" (the invasion of the Andaman Islands on 23 March. She served patrol and escort duties out of Port Blair during the Japanese raids into the Indian Ocean. On 13–22 April Isonami returned via Singapore and Camranh Bay to Kure Naval Arsenal, for maintenance.

On 4–5 June, Isonami participated in the Battle of Midway as part of Admiral Isoroku Yamamoto's main fleet. While returning from the battle, she was damaged in a collision with Uranami and limped back to Yokosuka Naval Arsenal for repairs, which were not completed to the end of July. From August to September, Isonami was assigned to training missions with aircraft carriers Jun'yō and Hiyō in the Inland Sea, and escorted these aircraft carriers to Truk in early October. She was assigned to patrols out of Truk in October, and to "Tokyo Express" transport missions to various locations in the Solomon Islands to mid January 1943.

On 1 December, Isonami was damaged off Buna, New Guinea, in an air strike by United States Army Air Forces planes. On 18 December, she rescued the survivors from the torpedoed cruiser Tenryū.

In early January, Isonami returned to Kure Naval Arsenal for repairs. In February, she escorted a troop convoy from Pusan to Palau and on to Wewak. On 25 February, she was reassigned to the Southwest Area Fleet and was based at Surabaya to escort convoys throughout the Netherlands East Indies.

On 9 April 1943, while escorting a convoy from Surabaya to Ambon, Isonami was torpedoed and sunk by the submarine USS Tautog while rescuing survivors of torpedoed Penang Maru, 35 nautical miles (65 km) southeast of Wangiwangi Island at position 5°26′S 123°4′E). Of her crew, seven were killed and another nine injured.

On 1 August 1943, Isonami was removed from the navy list.
