= Japanese cruiser Natori =

Nagara-class light cruiser

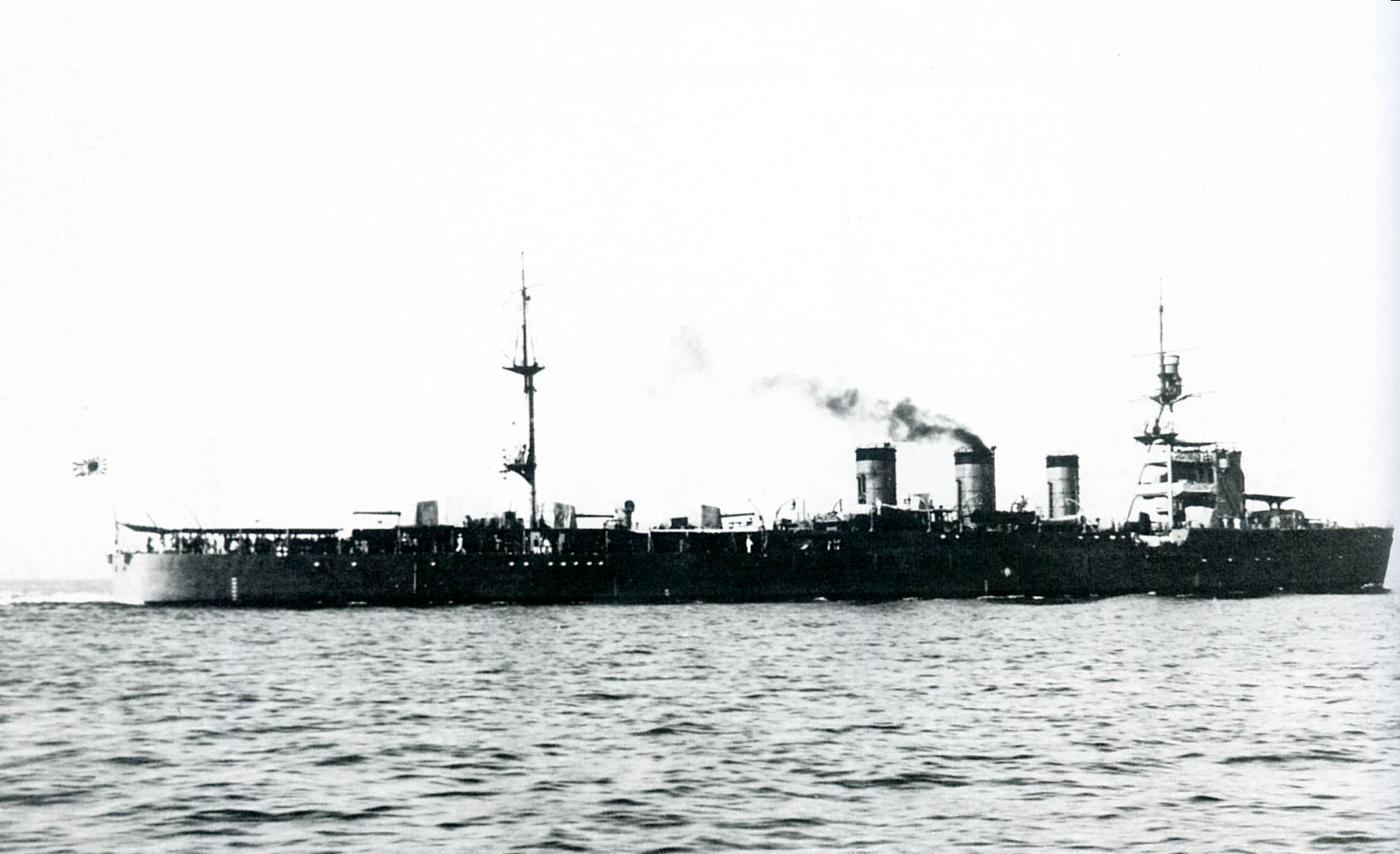
- Natori off Nagasaki in 1922

History

Empire of Japan
- Name: Natori
- Namesake: Natori River
- Ordered: 1919 Fiscal Year
- Builder: Mitsubishi
- Laid down: 14 December 1920
- Launched: 16 February 1922
- Commissioned: 15 September 1922
- Stricken: 10 October 1944
- Fate: Torpedoed and sunk, 18 August 1944

General characteristics
- Class & type: Nagara-class cruiser
- Displacement: 5,088 tons (standard)
- Length: 534 ft 9 in (162.99 m)
- Beam: 48 ft 5 in (14.76 m)
- Draught: 16 ft (4.9 m)
- Installed power: 12 Kampon boilers; 90,000 shp (67,000 kW)
- Propulsion: 4 shafts; 4 geared steam turbines
- Speed: 36 knots (67 km/h; 41 mph)
- Range: 9,000 nautical miles (17,000 km; 10,000 mi) at 10 knots (19 km/h; 12 mph)
- Complement: 438
- Armament: 7 × 5.5-inch (140 mm) guns (7×1); 2 × Type 96 25 mm (0.98 in) AA guns; 6 × 13.2 mm (0.52 in) AA guns; 8 × 610 mm torpedo tubes (4×2); 48 naval mines
- Armor: Belt 62 mm (2 in); Deck 30 mm (1 in)
- Aircraft carried: 1 × floatplane
- Aviation facilities: 1 × catapult

Natori (名取) was a Nagara-class light cruiser in the Imperial Japanese Navy. The ship was named after the Natori River in Miyagi prefecture, Japan. Natori was the third vessel completed in the Nagara class of light cruisers. Like other vessels of her class, she was intended for use as the flagship of a destroyer flotilla.

== Construction and career ==
=== Early career ===
Natori was completed at Mitsubishi's Nagasaki shipyard on 15 September 1922. Soon after commissioning, Natori was assigned to patrols off the China coast. From 1938, the cruiser was based in Taiwan and helped cover the landings of Japanese troops in southern China.

In 1940, a border dispute between Siam and French Indochina erupted into armed conflict. A Japanese-sponsored "Conference for the Cessation of Hostilities" was held at Saigon and preliminary documents for a cease-fire between the governments of General Philippe Pétain's Vichy France and the Kingdom of Siam were signed aboard Natori on January 31, 1941.

=== Early stages of the Pacific War ===
On 26 November 1941, Natori became flagship of Rear Admiral Kenzaburo Hara's Destroyer Squadron 5 under Vice Admiral Ibo Takahashi's Third Fleet and was assigned to the No.1 Surprise Attack Unit of the Philippine Seizure Force. At the time of the attack on Pearl Harbor, Natori was escorting six transports carrying elements of the Imperial Japanese Army's 48th Infantry Division from Mako, Pescadores to Aparri, northern Luzon. The landing force was attacked by three United States Army Air Forces B-17 Flying Fortress bombers of the 14th Squadron on 10 December 1941, which damaged Natori and the escorting destroyer Harukaze with near misses. After repairs at Mako, Natori ferried 27 transports with the 47th Infantry Regiment of the 48th Infantry Division and the 4th Tank Regiment to Lingayen Gulf in late December.

On 26 December 1941, Natori was reassigned to the No. 2 Escort Unit with the light cruiser Kashii, and tasked with escorting 43 transports of the Third Malaya Convoy to Singora.

=== Battle of the Sunda Strait ===
Natori was later assigned escort duties to cover the invasion force for the Dutch East Indies, and participated in the Battle of Sunda Strait on 28 February 1942.

Natori with Destroyer Division 5's Asakaze, Destroyer Division 11's Shirayuki, Hatsuyuki, Destroyer Division 12's Shirakumo and Murakumo and Destroyer Division 27's Shiratsuyu with Cruiser Division 7's Mikuma and Mogami deployed north and west of the landing areas. The heavy cruiser USS Houston and the light cruiser HMAS Perth sortied for Tjilatjap via the Sunda Strait and attacked Japanese troop transports screened only by Harukaze, Hatakaze and Fubuki. The destroyers made smoke to mask the transports. Fubuki charged Houston and Perth and launched torpedoes.

At 2300, the Third Escort Force's Natori and her destroyers arrived with the Western Support Force's Mogami, Mikuma and Shikinami. Shiratsuyu opened fire on the Allies. Natori, with Hatsuyuki and Shirayuki, then opened fire and rapidly closed the range. At 2308, the Allied cruisers turned northeast and Natori and her destroyers headed southeast in three columns. Between 2310 and 2319 they launched 28 torpedoes at the Allies. Perth's gunfire damaged Harukaze's rudder and Shirayuki's bridge. At 2319, Mikuma and Mogami each fired six Type 93 "Long Lance" torpedoes at Perth from about 9,300 yards (8,500 m) and opened main battery fire from about 12,000 yards (11,000 m), assisted by searchlights on their destroyers.

At 2327, Mogami fired six Long Lances at Houston. They missed but hit the Army transports Sakura Maru, Horai Maru, Tatsuno Maru, and the Commander-in-Chief of the invading Japanese 16th Army, Lieutenant General Hitoshi Imamura's transport Ryujo Maru. At 2326, Harukaze and Hatakaze launched torpedoes. At 2330, Shirakumo and Murakumo also launched torpedoes. Altogether, the Japanese launched about 90 torpedoes in the engagement. Perth, low on ammunition, was making 28 knots (52 km/h) when the first torpedo hit her forward engine room. Two more torpedoes hit her forward magazine and aft under "X" turret, and she sank 3 nautical miles (6 km) east-northeast of St. Nicholas Point after a fourth torpedo hit. At 0045, Houston sank.

On 10 March 1942, Natori was assigned to Cruiser Division 16 with the light cruiser Nagara. After the occupation of Java, Natori participated in the Battle of Christmas Island. At Christmas Island on 1 April 1942 the submarine USS Seawolf fired three torpedoes at Natori, but all missed. The cruiser Naka which was hit starboard near her No. 1 boiler was not so lucky, and had to be towed back to Bantam Bay by Natori.

In April, Natori was assigned to patrols of the Java Sea, which continued into June. After a refit back at Maizuru, Natori returned to the Java Sea and Timor Sea until December, with occasional calls at Mergui in Burma, Penang, Singapore and Davao.

On 21 December 1942, Natori embarked a Special Naval Landing Force, which it disembarked at Hollandia, New Guinea.

On 9 January 1943, 18 nautical miles (33 km) southeast of Ambon, Natori was sighted by the submarine USS Tautog at about 3,000 yards (3,000 m). Tautog fired two torpedoes which hit Natori in the stern. It broke off and carried away her rudder. In the next few minutes, as Natori got underway at reduced speed, Tautog fired two more torpedoes, but they either missed or were duds and Natori managed to escape.

== Refitting ==
On 21 January 1943, while at Ambon, Natori was damaged by a near-miss starboard side by a 500 lb (230 kg) bomb dropped by a Consolidated Aircraft B-24 Liberator bomber of the 90th Bomb Group's 319th Bomb Squadron. The bomb opened plates and caused the No. 2 boiler room to flood. Natori departed Ambon that day for repairs at Makassar, but repair proved impossible, so Natori continued on to Seletar Naval Base, Singapore. Repairs were not completed until 24 May 1943, but by then a decision was made to send Natori back to Japan for further repairs and modernization

At Maizuru Naval Arsenal, Natori's No. 5 and No. 7 140 mm guns were removed as were her catapult and derrick. A twin Type 89 127 mm HA gun was fitted, as were two triple mount Type 96 25 mm AA guns. This brought Natori's 25 mm AA suite to fourteen barrels (2×3, 2×2, 4×1). A Type 21 air-search radar was fitted and hydrophones were installed at her bow. Repairs and modernization were completed on 1 April 1944, and Natori was assigned as the flagship of the Central Pacific Fleet's Destroyer Squadron 3.

=== Actions in the Philippines ===
On 5 June 1944, Natori embarked an Imperial Japanese Army detachment from Kure to Davao, Mindanao where the cruiser disembarked the Army detachment and embarked other troops for Palau, arriving on 17 June 1944 (the day before the Battle of the Philippine Sea. Natori remained at Davao in late June through August as a guard ship.

On 20 July 1944, the submarine USS Bluegill patrolling off Davao spotted Natori making 26 knots (48 km/h), but was unable to gain a favorable firing position. Natori arrived in Palau 21 July 1944 to help evacuate 800 Japanese and Korean "comfort women" to Davao.

On 18 August 1944, 200 nautical miles (370 km) east of Samar, Natori was accompanying the transport T.3 to Palau when they were spotted by the submarine USS Hardhead east of San Bernardino Strait. Hardhead identified the target as a battleship and closed for a surface attack. One torpedo of its first salvo of five Mark 23 torpedoes fired at 2,800 yards (2,600 m) hit Natori portside in a boiler room. She stopped dead in the water and was hit starboard amidships with one of a second salvo of four Mark 18 torpedoes.

At 0704, Natori sank at 12°29′N 128°49′E, taking 330 crewmen including Captain Kubota with her. The destroyers Uranami and Kiyoshimo rescued 194 survivors, and the submarine USS Stingray recovered four more survivors in a rubber raft. On 12 September 1944, almost a month after her sinking, the destroyer USS Marshall captured a lifeboat with another 44 survivors from Natori aboard. According to survivor Matsunaga Ichirô, three cutters from Natori containing 180 survivors rowed 13 days from the site of the sinking to a Japanese torpedo-boat station located on the northeastern tip of Mindanao Island near Surigao.

Natori was removed from the Navy List on 10 October 1944.
