= William B. Sieglaff =

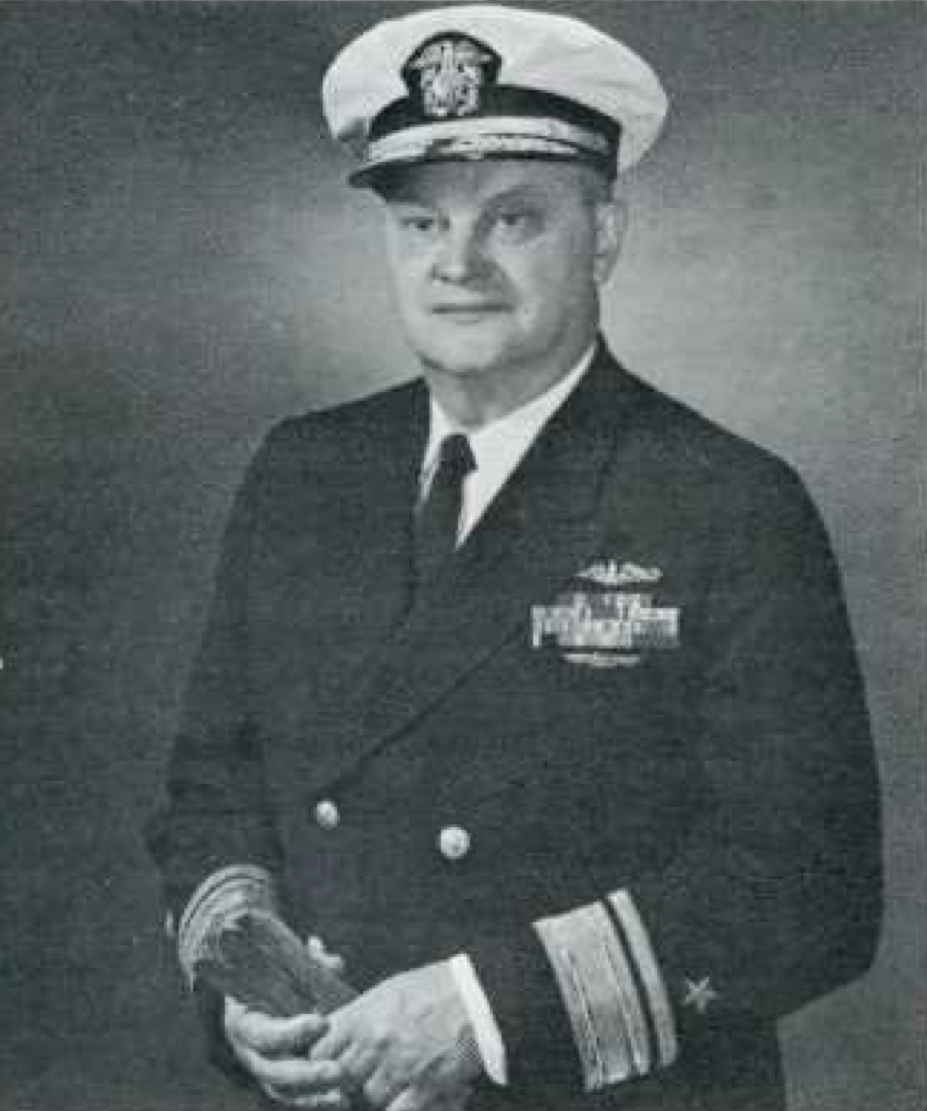
- Born: William Bernard Sieglaff; July 6, 1908; Albert Lea, Minnesota, U.S.
- Died: August 16, 1995; Urbanna, Virginia, U.S.
- Burial place: United States Naval Academy Cemetery
- Spouse: Ruth Alice Maynard
- Relatives: ADM George E. Maynard (FIL)
- Military career
- Allegiance: United States of America
- Branch: United States Navy
- Service years: 1931–1966
- Rank: Rear admiral
- Nickname: "Barney"
- Service number: 0-70125
- Commands: USS Tautog (SS-199); USS Tench (SS/AGSS-417); Submarine Division 81; Cruiser Division TWO; USS Allagash (AO-97); USS Albany (CA-123)
- Conflicts: World War II; Pacific Theatre
- Awards: Navy Cross (2); Silver Star (3); Legion of Merit (3); Navy and Marine Corps Medal

William Bernard Sieglaff (July 6, 1908 – August 16, 1995) was double Navy Cross recipient and decorated submarine commander during World War II who reached the rank of rear admiral in the United States Navy.

== Early life ==
William Bernard Sieglaff was born on July 6, 1908, in Albert Lea, Minnesota, to Henry William and Helen Beatrice Sieglaff (née Knatvold). His father was of German ancestry and his mother was of Norwegian ancestry. He completed his high school education in Los Angeles, California, before joining the U.S. Naval Academy in Annapolis, Maryland, on June 13, 1927.

== Early naval career ==
Sieglaff graduated from the academy and was commissioned as an ensign in the U.S. Navy on June 4, 1931. After receiving his commission, Sieglaff was assigned to the USS Oklahoma (BB-37). In May 1933 he received order to attend Submarine School at the US Submarine Base in New London, Connecticut graduating six months later. His first submarine assignment was aboard the USS S-37 in the Asiatic Fleet until February 1937. After completing his time abroad the S-37, Sieglaff was sent to Mare Island Navy Yard in California to aid in the fitting out of the USS Pompano (SS-181). He served onboard the USS Pompano from the commissioning until May 1938, when he was sent to the Massachusetts Institute of Technology to study Naval Engineering, receiving his Master of Science degree in June 1941. After completing his degree he was assigned to the staff of Submarine Division 62 as an engineering officer at Naval Station Pearl Harbor.

== Attack on Pearl Harbor ==
On Sunday, December 7, 1941, Sieglaff was the officer of the deck aboard the USS Tautog (SS-199). The Tautog was moored at Pearl Harbor when the Imperial Japanese Navy Air Service attacked by surprise. Sieglaff directed torpedoman’s mate Pasqual Mignon to man Tautog's anti-aircraft gun and return fire. Tautog was given partial credit for the first aircraft downed. Mignon then shot down a Nakajima B5N torpedo bomber, giving the Tautog the first sole credit for shooting down an enemy plane in World War II.

== War patrols ==
Lieutenant Commander Sieglaff deployed to Australia along with the rest of Submarine Division 62. In November 1942, Sieglaff was promoted to commander and he took command of his first submarine, USS Tautog (SS-199). Sieglaff proved himself to be a skillful and aggressive skipper commanding Tautog's 5th and 6th war patrols, accrediting him with 13,690 tons sunk and an additional 9,750 tons damaged, resulting in him being awarded his first Navy Cross. On Tautog's 7th War Patrol, Sieglaff was credited with 14,300 tons and was awarded his first Silver Star for his exploits. He was awarded two more Silver Stars, one each for Tautog's 8th and 9th war patrols. Tautog's 10th war patrol would be Commander Sieglaff's last patrol in command of the Tautog. He was accredited with successfully sinking 17,736 tons of shipping and damaging 8,000 more. This success resulted in him being awarded his second Navy Cross. In June 1944, Commander Sieglaff was sent to Portsmouth Naval Shipyard as the prospective commanding officer of the USS Tench. The USS Tench was the lead ship of her class of submarine, and was sponsored by Claudia A. Johnson, the wife of future president Lyndon B. Johnson. Sieglaff took command of the Tench when commissioned on 6 October 1944. After Sieglaff ran the newly commissioned submarine and crew through trials and shakedown, the USS Tench set off for Pearl Harbor, stopping at Key West and the Panama Canal Zone for training. The Tench's first war patrol took part in a wolfpack as well as picket line and lifeguard duties.

== Operation Barney ==
In April 1945, Commander Sieglaff was given orders to serve on the staff of Commander, Submarine Force, U.S. Pacific Fleet (COMSUBPAC) as special projects officer under Charles A. Lockwood. Lockwood had been overseeing the development of frequency-modulated sonar (FMS), which would allow submarine to navigate minefields. Commander Sieglaff was given the task to plan an operation using this new technology to navigate Japanese minefields, giving them access to the Sea of Japan, an area with a lot of Japanese merchant shipping. Commander William "Barney" Sieglaff was honored by becoming the namesake of "Operation Barney."

== Postwar career ==
After World War II, Sieglaff held several significant positions, including placement officer in the Bureau of Naval Personnel and commanding officer of Submarine Division 81. He continued to rise through the ranks, holding leadership positions such as chief of staff to the Commander Submarine Force, Pacific Fleet, and commanding various naval vessels. By 1964, he served as commandant of the First Naval District and commander Naval Base in Boston, Massachusetts. His retirement came on July 1, 1966.

== Navy Cross citations ==
Throughout his career, Sieglaff received several prestigious awards, including the following two Navy Cross citations:

First Navy Cross

The President of the United States of America takes pleasure in presenting the Navy Cross to Lieutenant Commander William Bernard Sieglaff (NSN: 0-70125), United States Navy, for extraordinary heroism in the line of his profession as Commanding Officer of the U.S.S. TAUTOG (SS-199), on the FIFTH and SIXTH War Patrols of that submarine during the period 15 December 1942 to 19 April 1943, in enemy controlled waters of the Pacific War Area. During this period of intense activity, Lieutenant Commander Sieglaff distinguished himself by his brilliant tactical knowledge and sound judgment in maneuvering his vessel into advantageous striking positions so skillfully and aggressively as to destroy three hostile merchant ships, a destroyer and three smaller craft, totaling 13,690 tons, and to damage an additional 9,750 tons consisting of a light cruiser and a tanker. Through his excellent direction of these hazardous operations he was able to complete his vital missions successfully, without serious damage to his ship, despite persistent and violent enemy counter measures. The expert professional ability and valiant devotion to duty displayed by Lieutenant Commander Sieglaff under extremely adverse conditions contributed greatly to the efforts of our forces against a determined and desperate enemy and were in keeping with the highest traditions of the United States Naval Service.

Second Navy Cross

The President of the United States of America takes pleasure in presenting a Gold Star in lieu of a Second Award of the Navy Cross to Commander William Bernard Sieglaff (NSN: 0-70125), United States Navy, for extraordinary heroism in the line of his profession as Commanding Officer of the U.S.S. TAUTOG (SS-199), on the TENTH War Patrol of that submarine during the period 5 to 25 March 1944, in enemy controlled waters of the Pacific War Area. Displaying expert seamanship, Commander Sieglaff directed his ship in attacks on heavily escorted enemy convoys and, despite premature torpedoes and hostile countermeasures, tenaciously pursued his targets to sink five enemy freighters totaling 17,736 tons and to damage two additional freighters totaling 8,000 tons. In spire of the enemy's concentrated efforts to the contrary, he succeeded in bringing his ship to port undamaged. By his forceful initiative and leadership, Commander Sieglaff contributed materially to the over-all success of the Allied operations and upheld the highest traditions of the United States Naval Service.

-

== Death ==
William Bernard Sieglaff died on August 16, 1995, in Urbanna, Middlesex County, Virginia.
