= Japanese submarine I-28 =

History

Empire of Japan
- Name: I-28
- Builder: Mitsubishi
- Laid down: 25 September 1939
- Launched: 17 December 1940
- Commissioned: 6 February 1942
- Fate: Sunk, 17 May 1942

General characteristics
- Class & type: Type B1 submarine
- Displacement: 2,631 tonnes (2,589 long tons) surfaced; 3,713 tonnes (3,654 long tons) submerged
- Length: 108.7 m (356 ft 8 in) overall
- Beam: 9.3 m (30 ft 6 in)
- Draft: 5.1 m (16 ft 9 in)
- Installed power: 12,400 bhp (9,200 kW) (diesel); 2,000 hp (1,500 kW) (electric motor)
- Propulsion: Diesel-electric; 1 × diesel engine; 1 × electric motor
- Speed: 23.5 knots (43.5 km/h; 27.0 mph) surfaced; 8 knots (15 km/h; 9.2 mph) submerged
- Range: 14,000 nmi (26,000 km; 16,000 mi) at 16 knots (30 km/h; 18 mph) surfaced; 96 nmi (178 km; 110 mi) at 3 knots (5.6 km/h; 3.5 mph) submerged
- Test depth: 100 m (330 ft)
- Crew: 94
- Armament: 6 × bow 533 mm (21 in) torpedo tubes; 1 × 14 cm (5.5 in) deck gun; 2 × single 25 mm (1 in) Type 96 anti-aircraft guns
- Aircraft carried: 1 × floatplane
- Aviation facilities: 1 × catapult

The Japanese submarine I-28 was one of 20 Type B cruiser submarines of the B1 sub-class built for the Imperial Japanese Navy (IJN) during the 1940s.

== Design and description ==
The Type B submarines were derived from the earlier KD6 sub-class of the Kaidai class and were equipped with an aircraft to enhance their scouting ability. They displaced 2,631 tonnes (2,589 long tons) surfaced and 3,713 tonnes (3,654 long tons) submerged. The submarines were 108.7 meters (356 ft 8 in) long, had a beam of 9.3 meters (30 ft 6 in) and a draft of 5.1 meters (16 ft 9 in). They had a diving depth of 100 meters (330 ft).

For surface running, the boats were powered by two 6,200-brake-horsepower (4,623 kW) diesel engines, each driving one propeller shaft. When submerged each propeller was driven by a 1,000-horsepower (746 kW) electric motor. They could reach 23.6 knots (43.7 km/h; 27.2 mph) on the surface and 8 knots (15 km/h; 9.2 mph) underwater. On the surface, the B1s had a range of 14,000 nautical miles (26,000 km; 16,000 mi) at 16 knots (30 km/h; 18 mph); submerged, they had a range of 96 nmi (178 km; 110 mi) at 3 knots (5.6 km/h; 3.5 mph).

The boats were armed with six internal bow 53.3 cm (21.0 in) torpedo tubes and carried a total of 17 torpedoes. They were also armed with a single 140 mm (5.5 in)/40 deck gun and two single mounts for 25 mm (1 in) Type 96 anti-aircraft guns. In the Type Bs, the aircraft hangar was faired into the base of the conning tower. A single catapult was positioned on the forward deck.

== Construction and career ==
I-28 was commissioned at Kobe, Japan on February 6, 1942. The submarine participated in the Battle of the Coral Sea in May 1942. Returning to base at Truk in the central Pacific, I-28 was torpedoed and sunk with all hands (88 officers and men) by the United States Navy submarine Tautog at 06°30′N 152°00′E on 17 May 1942.
