= Japanese cruiser Nagara =

Imperial Japanese Navy cruiser

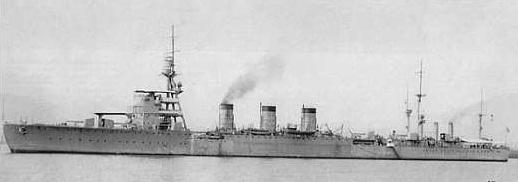
- Japanese light cruiser Nagara

History

Empire of Japan
- Name: Nagara
- Ordered: 1919 Fiscal Year
- Builder: Sasebo Naval Arsenal
- Laid down: 9 September 1920
- Launched: 25 April 1921
- Commissioned: 21 April 1922
- Stricken: 10 October 1944
- Fate: Torpedoed and sunk, 7 August 1944

General characteristics
- Class & type: Nagara-class light cruiser
- Displacement: 5,570 long tons (5,659 t)
- Length: 162.1 m (531 ft 10 in)
- Beam: 14.2 m (46 ft 7 in)
- Draft: 4.8 m (15 ft 9 in)
- Installed power: 12 Kampon boilers; 90,000 shp (67,000 kW)
- Propulsion: 4 shafts; geared steam turbines
- Speed: 36 knots (67 km/h; 41 mph)
- Range: 9,000 nmi (17,000 km; 10,000 mi) at 10 knots (19 km/h; 12 mph)
- Complement: 450
- Armament: As built; 7 × single 14 cm (5.5 in) guns; 2 × single 7.62 cm (3 in) AA guns; 2 x twin, 4 × single 25 mm (1 in) AA guns; 5 × twin 13.2 mm (0.52 in) machine guns; 2 × twin 61 cm (24 in) torpedo tubes; July 1944; 5 × single 14 cm guns; 1 × twin 12.7 cm (5 in) DP guns; 2 × single 7.62 cm AA guns; 2 × triple, 6 × twin, 14 × single 25 mm AA guns; 10 × 13.2 mm machine guns; 2 × quadruple 61 cm torpedo tubes
- Armor: 62 mm (2.4 in) (belt); 30 mm (1.2 in) (deck)
- Aircraft carried: 1 × floatplane
- Aviation facilities: 1 aircraft catapult

Nagara (長良) was the lead ship of her class of light cruiser in the Imperial Japanese Navy. She was named after the Nagara River in the Chūbu region of Japan.

== Background ==
Nagara, as with the other vessels of her class, was intended for use as the flagship of a destroyer flotilla, and it was in that role that she participated in the invasions of the Philippines and the Dutch East Indies after the attack on Pearl Harbor.

== Design ==
The Nagara-class vessels were essentially identical to the earlier Kuma-class cruisers, using the same hull design, powerplant and layout of armament. The main differences were in the design of the bridge, which was raised to allow for an aircraft hangar and launch platform above the No.2 gun in front of the bridge. Another change was the installation of the new, larger Type 93 torpedoes, which required an extension of the main deck.

All vessels in the class were modified extensively during their operational lives, with no two vessels modified in the same way.

== Service career ==
=== Early career ===
Nagara was laid down on 9 September 1920, launched on 25 April 1921 and completed at Sasebo Naval Arsenal, and commissioned on 21 April 1922. Soon after commissioning, Nagara was assigned to the Japanese naval base at Port Arthur, from where she patrolled the China coast to Qingdao. She was commanded by Captain Takeo Takagi from November 1933 to November 1934 and by Captain Sadamichi Kajioka from November 1935 to December 1936.

As the Second Sino-Japanese War continued to escalate, Nagara was assigned to provide cover for Japanese transports during the Battle of Shanghai, and remained on station patrolling the China coast and the Yangtze River through 1939. With the heavy cruisers Myōkō and Nachi, Nagara participated in the Hainan Island Operation in February 1939 under Vice Admiral Nobutake Kondō. From 30 January 1941 to 8 April 1941, Nagara assisted in the Invasion of French Indochina. From 10 June 1941 to 9 September 1941, Nagara provided coverage for the landings of Japanese troops in southern China.

=== Invasion of the Philippines and Dutch East Indies ===
On 10 September 1941. Nagara was assigned to Vice Admiral Ibō Takahashi's 16th Cruiser Division of the IJN 3rd Fleet, together with the heavy cruiser Ashigara, light cruisers Kuma and Natori and the 5th Destroyer Flotilla. On 26 November 1941, as flagship of Rear Admiral Kyuji Kubo's Fourth Surprise Attack Unit, Nagara was based at Palau at the time of the attack on Pearl Harbor.

From 11–12 December 1941, Nagara covered the landings of troops at Legaspi, Luzon, Philippines, returning again from 24–30 December 1941 to cover additional landings at several points on southeast Luzon.

In January 1942, Nagara was tasked with escorting the convoy landing the Sasebo No. 1 Special Naval Landing Force (SNLF) at Menado and Kendari in the Celebes. On 25 January 1942, while at Kendari, the destroyer Hatsuharu collided with Nagara, damaging the cruiser's hull. Rear Admiral Kubo transferred his flag to the destroyer Hatsushimo, and Nagara withdrew to Davao for repairs. Returning to the Celebes on 4 February 1942, Rear Admiral Kubō transferred his flag back to Nagara, which then covered the invasion of Makassar. In the middle of the night of 6 February 1942, the invasion force was sighted by the submarine USS Sculpin, which mistook Nagara for a Tenryū-class cruiser and fired two Mark 14 torpedoes; one missed and the other prematurely exploded. On 17 February 1942, Nagara provided escort for transports with the Imperial Japanese Army's 48th Infantry Division for the invasion of Bali and Java. During the operation, the Royal Navy submarine HMS Truant fired six torpedoes at Nagara, scoring two hits, but both failed to explode.

On 10 March 1942, the Third Fleet was replaced by the Second Southern Expeditionary Fleet under Vice Admiral Takahashi. Nagara remained in Rear Admiral Kenzaburō Hara's 16th Cruiser Division with the light cruisers Kinu and Natori. On 29 March 1942, Nagara was part of the force sent to capture Christmas Island. During the operation, the submarine USS Seawolf fired three torpedoes at Nagara, but all missed.

Nagara departed for Japan on 2 April 1942, where she was in drydock at Maizuru Naval Arsenal from 12 to 24 April 1942.

Nagara was assigned as flagship of Rear Admiral Susumu Kimura's 10th Destroyer Flotilla with the destroyers Nowaki, Arashi, Hagikaze, Maikaze, Makigumo, Kazagumo, Yūgumo, Urakaze, Isokaze, Hamakaze, and Tanikaze under Admiral Chuichi Nagumo's IJN 1st Fleet.

=== Battle of Midway ===
In the Battle of Midway Nagara accompanied Admiral Nagumo's Carrier Striking Force, with the aircraft carriers Akagi, Kaga, Sōryū, Hiryū, battleships Haruna and Kirishima and cruisers Tone and Chikuma. On 4 June 1942 Nagara unsuccessfully counter-attacked the submarine USS Nautilus after the latter attempted to torpedo Kirishima. After Akagi was hit and set afire by dive bombers from USS Enterprise, Vice-Admiral Nagumo transferred his flag to Nowaki and then to Nagara.

Nagara returned safely to Japan on 13 June 1942. She brought about 500 wounded to Hashirajima, where they were transferred to the hospital ship Hikawa Maru on 15 June.

=== Battle of the Solomon Islands ===
On 14 July 1942, the 10th Destroyer Flotilla with Nagara was reassigned to the Third Fleet, which departed for Truk, Caroline Islands on 16 August 1942. The fleet included the aircraft carriers Shōkaku, Zuikaku, Ryūjō, battleships Hiei and Kirishima, cruisers Tone and Chikuma, and destroyers Akigumo, Makigumo, Kazagumo, Yūgumo, Akizuki, Hatsukaze, Nowaki, Amatsukaze, Maikaze, Tanikaze and Tokitsukaze.

On 25 August 1942, Nagara participated in the Battle of the Eastern Solomons, which it survived without damage, arriving at Truk on 5 September 1942. From Truk, Nagara made a number of sorties towards the Solomon Islands in September. On 25–26 October 1942, Nagara participated in the Battle of Santa Cruz, and again returned to Truk undamaged.

=== Naval battle of Guadalcanal ===
On 9 November 1942, Rear Admiral Kimura and the Nagara squadron was assigned to screen Hiei and Kirishima during a reinforcement plan to land 14,500 men, heavy weapons and supplies on Guadalcanal. The landing was preceded by a bombardment of Henderson Field by the battleships. This action became the First Naval Battle of Guadalcanal on 13 November 1942. During the engagement, Akatsuki and Yūdachi were sunk, while Amatsukaze, Murasame and Ikazuchi were damaged. Most notably, Hiei had been struck by two 8-inch (203 mm) shells from the heavy cruiser USS San Francisco which jammed her rudder in a hard turn, unable to maneuver.

For her part, Nagara combined fire with the destroyer Yukikaze to sink the destroyer USS Cushing, but in exchange she was straddled by shells from San Francisco and took a direct hit by one 5-inch (127 mm) shell which killed six crewmen, but which caused only minor hull damage. Nagara retired westward around Savo Island escorting Kirishima with Hiei in tow, but Hiei was later scuttled following attacks by planes from Henderson Field, USS Enterprise and B-17 Flying Fortress bombers from Espiritu Santo.

Vice Admiral Gunichi Mikawa sortied from the Shortland Islands for Guadalcanal in Chōkai with the Kinugasa, light cruiser Isuzu, and destroyers Arashio and Asashio to carry out Kondō's original plan and bombard Henderson Field with his cruisers where Abe failed with his battleships. The cruisers Maya, Suzuya, Tenryū and destroyers Kazagumo, Makigumo, Michishio and Yūgumo accompanied, while Kirishima, Atago, Takao, Nagara and six destroyers formed a screening unit.

This led to the 2nd Naval Battle of Guadalcanal on 15 November 1942. Nagara and her destroyers engaged the Americans with gunfire and Type 93 "Long Lance" torpedoes, taking part in the initial successful action against US destroyers. Nagara sank the destroyer USS Preston with gunfire, particularly a hit which detonated Preston's 5-inch (127 mm) gun magazines, causing a massive explosion. Meanwhile, the destroyer Ayanami torpedoed and sank the destroyer USS Walke, while the destroyer Uranami sank the destroyer USS Benham with a torpedo, before both Ayanami and Uranami combined fire to cripple the destroyer USS Gwin. During the action, more than 30 torpedoes were launched at the battleship USS South Dakota, but all missed. On the Japanese side, the battleship USS Washington surprise attacked Kirishima at mere point blank range, crippling the ship with seventeen 5-inch shells and twenty 16-inch (406 mm) shells, and crippled Ayanami but Nagara was undamaged, and returned to Truk on 18 November 1942. Kirishima succumbed to her damage and sank the next morning after the battle, while Ayanami was promptly scuttled by Uranami.

On 20 November 1942, Nagara became flagship of Rear Admiral Takama's 4th Destroyer Flotilla. The newly commissioned Agano replaced Nagara as flagship of 10th Destroyer Flotilla. The 4th Destroyer Flotilla consisted of three divisions of nine destroyers: 2nd Destroyer Division with three destroyers, 9th Destroyer Division with two and 27th Destroyer Division with four.

After returning to Maizuru for refit at the end of 1942, Nagara's No. 5 140 mm gun was removed. During gunnery exercises off Saipan, Nagara sustained minor superstructure damage after an accidental shell explosion. Nagara returned to Truk on 25 January 1943.

In early February, Nagara participated in the evacuation of Guadalcanal, recovering 11,700 surviving Imperial Japanese Army troops.

In June 1943, Nagara transported the Yokosuka No. 2 Special Naval Landing Force for the occupation of Nauru.

=== Operations in the South Pacific ===
In July 1943, Nagara was involved in escorting the aircraft carrier Jun'yō while ferrying aircraft to Kavieng, New Guinea. While mooring, Nagara detonated a mine laid at night by Australian PBY Catalina flying boats. The mine slightly damaged her bottom under the stern, and she was able to operate.

On 20 July 1943, the 4th Destroyer Flotilla was deactivated and Nagara replaced the Jintsū as flagship of Rear Admiral Shunji Isaki's 2nd Destroyer Flotilla of the IJN 2nd Fleet, consisting of Destroyer Divisions 24, 27, 31, plus three attached destroyers. Nagara was relieved as flagship of 2nd Destroyer Flotilla by the newly commissioned cruiser Noshiro on 20 August 1943, and was reassigned to the IJN 8th Fleet under Vice Admiral, Baron Tomoshige Samejima. Nagara also returned to Maizuru for refit with a Type 21 air-search radar and four twin-mount Type 96 25 mm AA guns.

On 1 November 1943, Nagara relieved Kashima as flagship of the Fourth Fleet under Vice Admiral Masami Kobayashi. On 14 November 1943, she assisted in towing the light cruiser Agano back to Truk after the cruiser had been torpedoed by the submarine USS Skate.

On 22 November 1943, Nagara sortied from Truk in response to the American invasion of Tarawa and the Gilbert Islands, arriving at Kwajalein on 26 November 1943. It was attacked by Grumman TBF Avenger torpedo bombers and Douglas SBD Dauntless dive bombers from Task Group 50.3's aircraft carriers USS Enterprise and Essex and damaged enough to justify a return to Japan in January 1944.

At Maizuru Naval Arsenal from 26 January 1944, Nagara was again modified. The No. 7 140 mm gun mount was removed and replaced by a 127 mm unshielded HA gun mount. The fore and aft twin torpedo tubes were removed and replaced by two quadruple mounts aft. The aircraft catapult was removed and replaced by two triple-mount Type 96 25 mm AA gun mounts bringing the Nagara's 25 mm total to 22 barrels (2x3, 6x2, 4x1). Depth charge rails were installed in the stern and a Type 93 hydrophone set was fitted in the bow.

On 15 May 1944, Nagara replaced the cruiser Tatsuta as flagship of 11th Destroyer Flotilla, directly under the Combined Fleet. She remained in Japanese home waters training with new destroyers and escorting a convoy to the Ogasawara Islands in June and to Okinawa in July. In another refit at Yokosuka Naval Arsenal on 2 July 1944, ten single-mount Type 96 25 mm AA guns were installed, bringing Nagara's 25 mm total to 32 barrels (2X3, 6x2, 14x1). A Type 22 surface-search radar was fitted.

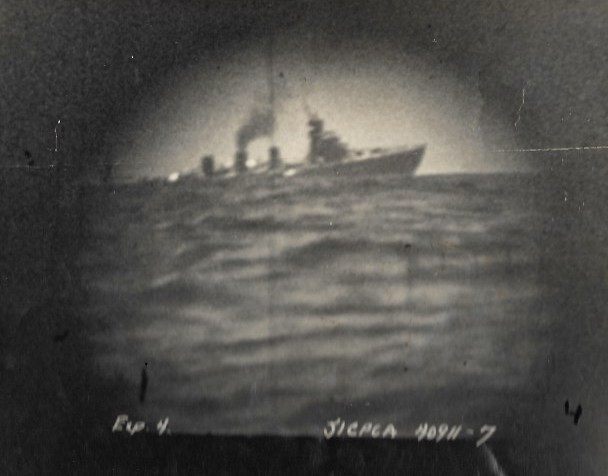
Photo of the sinking through Croaker's periscope

On 7 August 1944, en route from Kagoshima to Sasebo, Nagara was spotted by the submarine USS Croaker on her first war patrol. Croaker closed to 1,300 yards (1,200 m) and fired a salvo of four stern torpedoes, with one hitting Nagara starboard aft. Nagara sank by the stern off the Amakusa Islands at 32°09′N 129°53′E. The captain and 348 crewmen went down with the ship, but 235 crewmen were rescued. Nagara was removed from the Navy List on 10 October 1944.

Nagara's wreck was located in August 1981 by a Japanese research vessel, ship is broken in two. The wreck was photographed for the first time on 21 July 2026 by diver Yoshitaka Isaji.
