= Nagara-class cruiser =

Class of light cruisers of the Imperial Japanese Navy

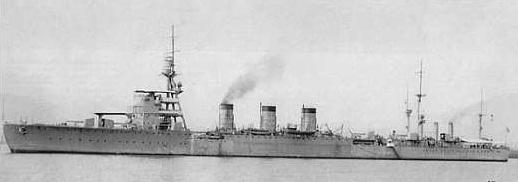
- Japanese light cruiser Nagara

Class overview
- Name: Nagara class
- Builders: Sasebo Naval Arsenal (2); Uraga Dock Company (2); Mitsubishi Shipbuilding, Nagasaki (1); Kawasaki Dockyard, Kobe (1)
- Operators: Imperial Japanese Navy
- Preceded by: Kuma class
- Succeeded by: Yūbari (chronologically); Sendai class (design)
- Built: 1920–1924
- In service: 1922–1944
- In commission: 1920–1945
- Planned: 6
- Completed: 6
- Lost: 6

General characteristics
- Type: Light cruiser
- Displacement: 5,570 long tons (5,659 t) normal (7203 t deep load)
- Length: 162.1 m (531 ft 10 in) o/a; 158.6 m (520 ft 4 in) w/l
- Beam: 14.2 m (46 ft 7 in)
- Draft: 4.8 m (15 ft 9 in)
- Installed power: 154kW 110V electrical
- Propulsion: 4 shaft Gihon geared turbines; 12 Kampon boilers; 90,000 shp (67,000 kW)
- Speed: 36 knots (41 mph; 67 km/h)
- Range: 6,000 nmi (11,000 km) at 14 kn (26 km/h)
- Complement: 450
- Armament: 7 × 14 cm/50 3rd Year Type naval guns; 2 × 8 cm/40 3rd Year Type naval gun s; 8 × 610 mm (24 in) torpedo tubes (4x2); 48 naval mines
- Armor: Belt: 60 mm (2.4 in); Deck: 30 mm (1.2 in)

The Nagara-class light cruisers (長良型軽巡洋艦, Nagaragata keijun'yōkan) were a class of six light cruisers built for and operated by the Imperial Japanese Navy. The Nagara-class cruisers proved useful in combat operations ranging from the Aleutian Islands to the Indian Ocean throughout World War II. Most served as flagships for destroyer or submarine squadrons, and were deployed for transport or local defense missions. Towards the end of the war, the surviving vessels were increasingly obsolete and were retained as second-line units.

The Nagara class was followed by the very similar Sendai class.

== Background ==
A final three 5,500 ton class light cruisers authorized under the 8-4 Fleet Program were ordered by the Imperial Japanese Navy in 1920. Due to minor changes in design, primarily due to advances in torpedo technology, these three vessels were initially designated as "modified Kuma-class", or "5500-ton class Type II", before being re-designated after the lead vessel, Nagara. A second set of three vessels was authorized in late 1920. These final three vessels were initially to be named Suzuka, Otonase, and Minase until November 1921.

== Design ==
The Nagara class was the second class of light cruisers in the Imperial Japanese Navy based on a standardized 5,500 ton displacement. In terms of dimensions and performance, it is almost identical to the previous Kuma-class cruisers; however, it was the first class of cruisers to be equipped with the new 610-millimetre (24 in) Type 93 Long Lance torpedo, which required a larger launcher.

The Nagara class used the same hull, engine, and armaments layout as the Kuma class. The Nagara-class hull design was based on a 5,500 ton nominal displacement, with a high freeboard and light bridge structure, behind which was a tripod mast with the fire control platform and two searchlights, the same as the Kuma class.

The propulsion system for the Nagara class was based on four axial deceleration turbines with 12 boilers, providing 90,000 hp (67,000 kW). Ten boilers were designed to burn heavy oil, and the remaining two burned a mixture of coal and oil. The Nagara-class vessels were capable of 36 knots (67 km/h; 41 mph), and a range of 9,000 nmi (17,000 km) at 10 kn (19 km/h; 12 mph).

The main battery consisted of seven 14 cm/50 3rd Year Type naval guns in individual gun turrets, (two fore, three aft, and one on either side of the bridge). The positioning meant that only six of the guns could be brought to bear in a broadside. As with the Kuma class, the Nagara class was highly deficient in anti-aircraft protection, with only two 8 cm/40 3rd Year Type naval guns and two 6.5 mm machine guns. Provision was made for 48 naval mines.

A major difference from the Kuma class was in the configuration of the bridge, which incorporated an aircraft hangar. Initially, a 33-foot (10 m) platform was mounted above the No.2 turret, extending over the forward superstructure below the bridge. This was later replaced by an aircraft catapult. Even so, the arrangement proved unwieldy, and during retrofits in 1929-1934, the catapult was moved to the rear of each ship, between the No. 5 and No. 6 turrets. The silhouette of the bridges varied somewhat from ship to ship, as Abukuma had a 20-foot (6.1 m) rangefinder located on top of the bridge, whereas Nagara and Isuzu had 15-foot (4.6 m) instruments, Natori had a 13-foot (4.0 m), and Yura and Kinu were equipped with 12-foot (3.7 m) instruments.

=== In service modifications ===
Near the start of World War II, Abukuma and Kinu were scheduled to be fitted as flagships for destroyer squadrons, with the new Type 93 torpedoes. However, due to shortages, only Abukuma received the twin quadruple-mount launcher as planned, and her forward launchers were removed. After the start of the war, each of the vessels in the Nagara class was modified and upgraded, especially to enhance anti-aircraft capabilities, but no two vessels were modified in the same way.

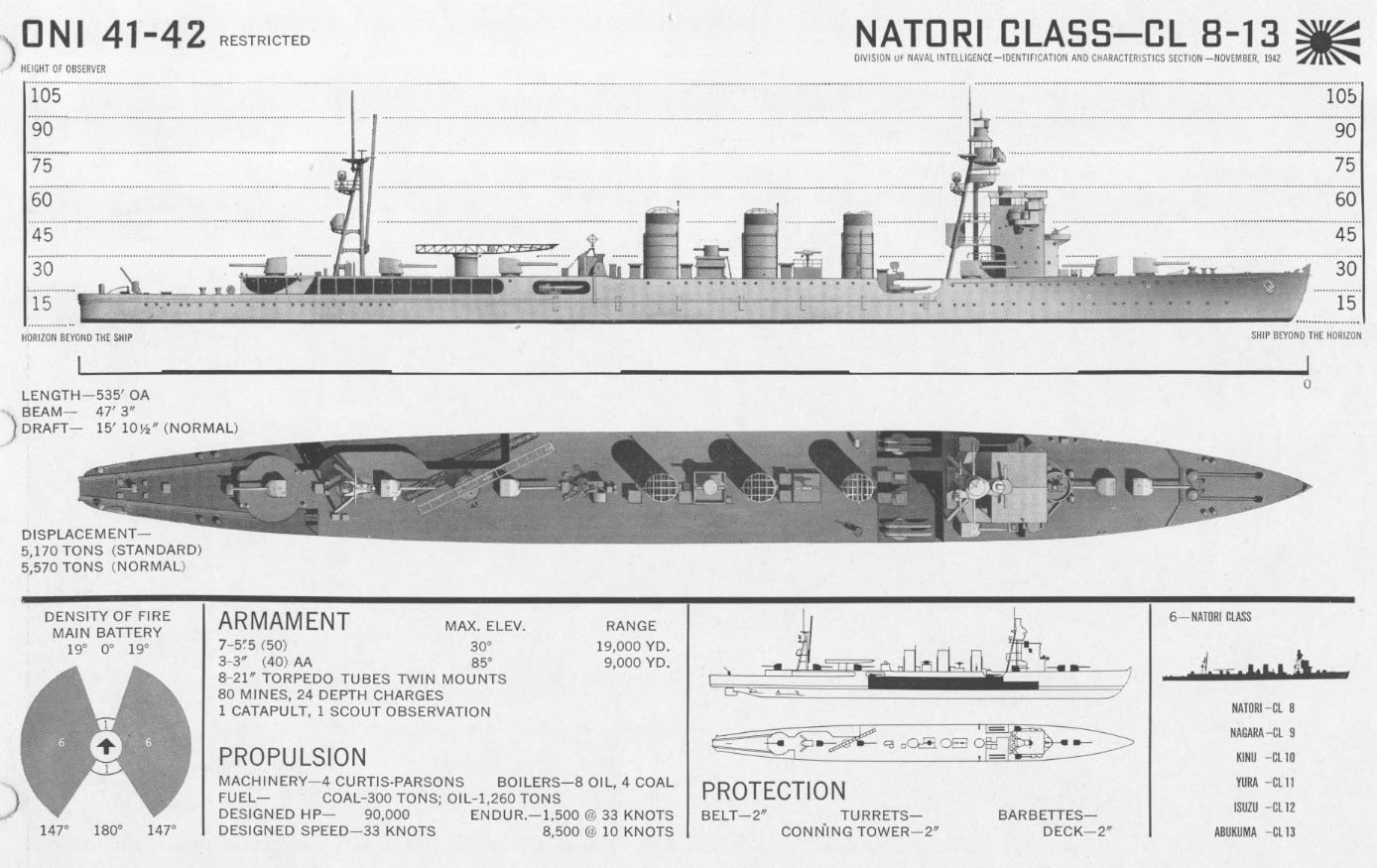
ONI drawing of the Nagara class (here designated as the Natori class)

To keep weight within design limits, the catapults were removed, and on almost all vessels, the No. 5 turret was replaced by a 12.7 cm/40 Type 89 naval gun twin mount, and the No. 7 turret was replaced by additional single and triple-mount Type 96 25 mm AA guns, wherever room permitted, supplemented by 13-mm machine guns.

From 1943-1944, the five surviving ships in the class received radar.

Isuzu was the only cruiser which underwent conversion into a dedicated anti-aircraft/anti-submarine cruiser. From May–September 1944, all of her main guns were removed and replaced by a total of three Type 89 twin-mounted anti-aircraft guns, with a Type 94 fire-control system added to the foremast. Her Type 96 25 mm AA guns were increased to a total of 11 triple-mounts and 17 single-mounts. Her torpedo launchers were replaced by two quadruple launchers mounted in the stern, along with two depth charge rails. She was given a complete set of the latest radar, hydrophones and sonar.

== Ships History ==
Six vessels were built in the Nagara class. None survived the Pacific War.

Nagara (長良)
Built by the Sasebo Naval Arsenal and commissioned on 22 April 1922, Nagara served in the initial battles of the Second Sino-Japanese War, including the Battle of Shanghai and the Invasion of French Indochina. After the attack on Pearl Harbor, Nagara covered the landings of Japanese troops in Malaya and the Dutch East Indies. She accompanied Admiral Nagumo's Carrier Striking Force during the Battle of Midway, at the end of which she took over from the destroyer Nowaki as the flagship of Admiral Nagumo after the loss of his flagship Akagi. Afterwards, she participated in the battles of the Eastern Solomons, Santa Cruz, and the Naval Battle of Guadalcanal (where she is credited with sinking the destroyer USS Preston). She was sunk by the submarine USS Croaker en route between Kagoshima and Sasebo on 7 August 1944.
Isuzu (五十鈴)
Built by the Uraga Dock Company, and commissioned on 15 August 1923, Isuzu covered the landings of Japanese troops in China, and the seizure of Hong Kong in early World War II. Afterwards assigned to the Dutch East Indies, during the Solomon Islands campaign she was active at the Battle of Santa Cruz and Naval Battle of Guadalcanal. Suffering severe damage in air attacks in late 1943, she was forced to return to Japan, where she underwent an extensive conversion into an anti-aircraft/anti-submarine cruiser. She survived the Battle of Leyte Gulf, but was sunk by a wolfpack of four submarines (three American and one British) off Sumbawa on 7 April 1945.
Natori (名取)
Completed by Mitsubishi Shipbuilding and Engineering Company Nagasaki on 15 September 1922, Natori covered the landings of Japanese troops in the Philippines and the Dutch East Indies. During the Battle of Sunda Strait, she contributed to sinking the cruisers USS Houston and HMAS Perth. Subsequently assigned to patrols in the Dutch East Indies, she returned to Japan to repair damage from air attack in June 1943, and was only able to resume duties in April 1944. She was sunk off Samar by the submarine USS Hardhead on 18 August 1944.
Yura (由良)
Commissioned at Sasebo Naval Arsenal on 20 March 1923, Yura was involved in the sinking of Prince of Wales and Repulse, and covered the landings of Japanese troops in Malaya and Sarawak. Afterwards, she participated in the Indian Ocean raid, the Battle of Midway, and the Battle of the Eastern Solomons. She was fatally damaged by United States Navy and United States Army Air Forces aircraft in the Solomon Islands and scuttled on 25 October 1942.
Kinu (鬼怒)
Completed at Kawasaki Dockyard Company in Kobe on 10 November 1922, Kinu was involved in the sinking of Prince of Wales and Repulse, and covered the landings of Japanese troops in Malaya and the Dutch East Indies. She was involved in various operations in the Solomon Islands and the Philippines, but was sunk by U.S. Navy aircraft in the Visayan Sea on 26 October 1944.
Abukuma (阿武隈)
Completed by the Uraga Dock Company on 26 May 1925, Abukuma took part in the attack on Pearl Harbor. She was later involved in the Battle of the Komandorski Islands, and remained active in northern waters under the IJN 5th Fleet until October 1944. However, when sent south to counter the American invasion of the Philippines, she was severely damaged by an American PT boat at the Battle of Surigao Strait on 25 October, and a subsequent attack by American land-based bombers fatally damaged her, causing her to be scuttled on 26 October 1944.

== Ships of the class ==
Construction data
Ship name	Namesake	Builder	Laid down	Launched	Commissioned	Sunk	Fate
Nagara (長良)	Nagara River (Japan) (長良川, Nagara-gawa))	Sasebo Naval Arsenal in Sasebo	09 September 1920	25 April 1921	21 April 1922	7 August 1944	Torpedoed and sunk by the submarine USS Croaker 7 August 1944.
Isuzu (五十鈴)	Isuzu River (五十鈴川, Isuzu-gawa)	Uraga Dock Company	10 August 1920	29 October 1921	15 August 1923	07 April 1945	Torpedoed and sunk by a group of four submarines on 7 April 1945.
Natori (名取)	Natori River (名取川, Natorigawa)	Mitsubishi Shipbuilding & Engineering Company in Nagasaki	14 December 1920	16 February 1922	15 September 1922	18 August 1944	Torpedoed by the submarine USS Hardhead on 18 August 1944.
Yura (由良)	Yura River (由良川, Yuragawa)	Sasebo Naval Arsenal in Sasebo	21 May 1921	15 February 1922	20 March 1923	25 October 1942	Scuttled, 25 October 1942
Kinu (鬼怒)	Kinu River (鬼怒川, Kinu-gawa)	Kawasaki Dockyard Company in Kobe	17 January 1921	29 May 1922	10 November 1922	26 October 1944	Sunk by U.S. Navy aircraft 26 October 1944.
Abukuma (阿武隈)	Abukuma River (阿武隈川, Abukuma-gawa)	Uraga Dock Company	08 December 1921	16 March 1923	26 May 1925	26 October 1944	Fatally damaged by American land-based bombers, abandoned on 26 October 1944
