= Japanese destroyer Shirakumo (1927) =

Fubuki-class destroyer

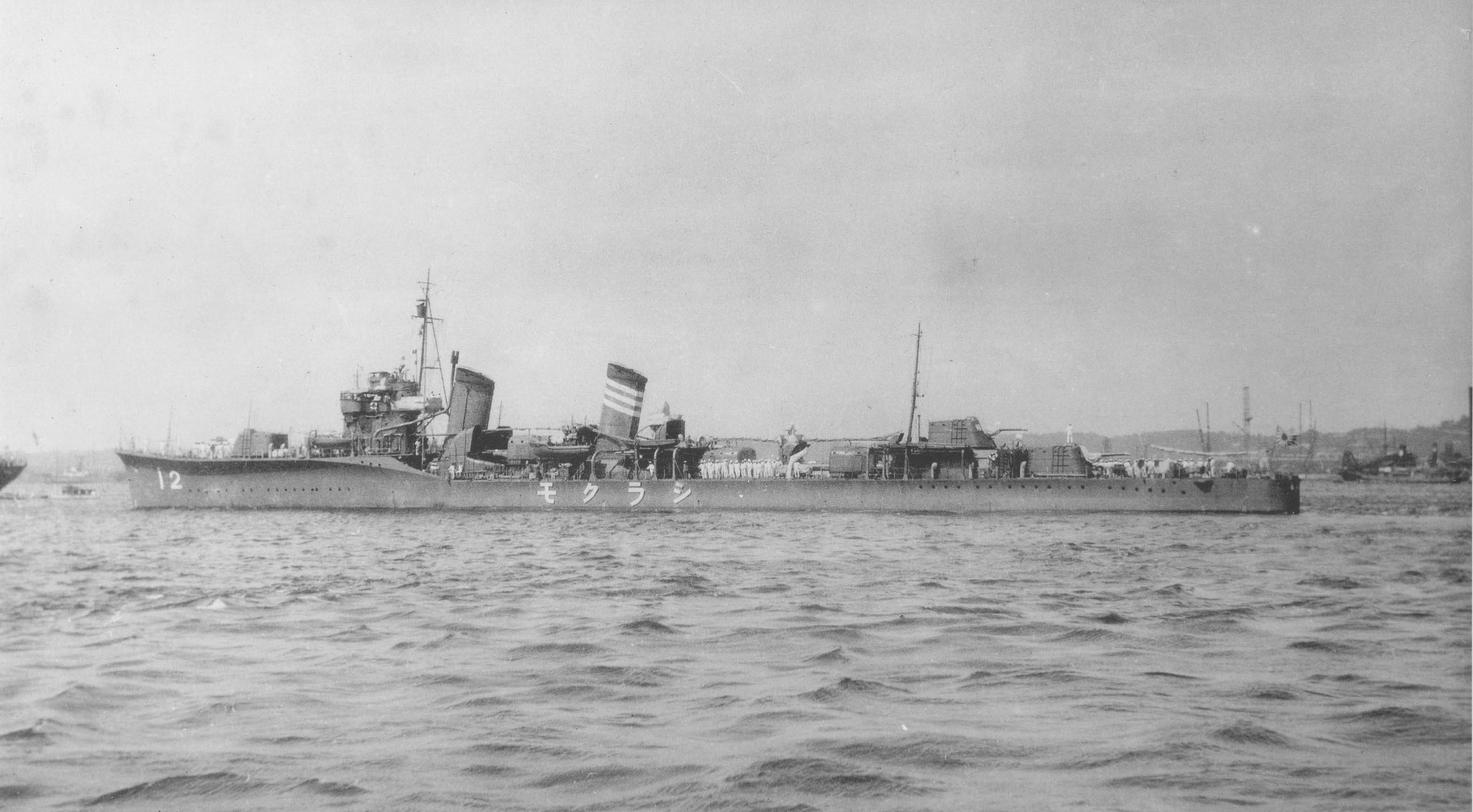
- Shirakumo on 5 September 1931

History

Empire of Japan
- Name: Shirakumo
- Namesake: Japanese destroyer Shirakumo (1901)
- Ordered: 1923 Fiscal Year
- Builder: Fujinagata Shipyards
- Yard number: Destroyer No.42
- Laid down: 27 October 1926
- Launched: 27 December 1927
- Commissioned: 28 July 1928
- Stricken: 31 March 1944
- Fate: Torpedoed and sunk, 16 March 1944

General characteristics
- Class & type: Fubuki-class destroyer
- Displacement: 1,750 long tons (1,780 t) standard; 2,050 long tons (2,080 t) re-built
- Length: 111.96 m (367.3 ft) pp; 115.3 m (378 ft) waterline; 118.41 m (388.5 ft) overall
- Beam: 10.4 m (34 ft 1 in)
- Draft: 3.2 m (10 ft 6 in)
- Propulsion: 4 × Kampon type boilers; 2 × Kampon Type Ro geared turbines; 2 × shafts at 50,000 ihp (37,000 kW)
- Speed: 38 knots (44 mph; 70 km/h)
- Range: 5,000 nmi (9,300 km) at 14 knots (26 km/h)
- Complement: 219
- Armament: 6 × Type 3 127 mm 50 caliber naval guns (3×2); up to 22 × Type 96 25 mm AT/AA guns; up to 10 × 13 mm AA guns; 9 × 610 mm (24 in) torpedo tubes; 36 × depth charges

Service record
- Operations: Second Sino-Japanese War; Battle of Malaya; Battle of Midway; Indian Ocean raid; Solomon Islands campaign

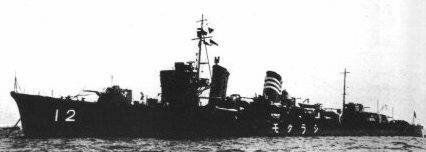
Shirakumo at anchor, 1932.

Shirakumo (白雲, ”White Cloud”) was a Fubuki-class destroyer and the eighth in a class of twenty-four vessels built for the Imperial Japanese Navy following World War I.

== History ==
Construction of the advanced Fubuki-class destroyers was authorized as part of the Imperial Japanese Navy's expansion program from fiscal 1923, intended to give Japan a qualitative edge with the world's most modern ships. The Fubuki class had performance that was a quantum leap over previous destroyer designs, so much so that they were designated Special Type destroyers (特型, Tokugata). The large size, powerful engines, high speed, large radius of action and unprecedented armament gave these destroyers the firepower similar to many light cruisers in other navies. Shirakumo, built at the Fujinagata Shipyards in Osaka was laid down on 27 October 1926, launched on 27 December 1927 and commissioned on 28 July 1928. Originally assigned hull designation “Destroyer No. 42”, she was completed as Shirakumo.

== Operational history ==
On completion, Shirakumo was assigned to Destroyer Division 11 under the IJN 2nd Fleet. During the Second Sino-Japanese War, Shirakumo was assigned to patrols of the southern China coast and participated in the Invasion of French Indochina in 1940.

=== World War II history ===
At the time of the attack on Pearl Harbor, Shirakumo was assigned to Destroyer Division 12 of Destroyer Squadron 3 of the IJN 1st Fleet, and had deployed from Kure Naval District to the port of Samah on Hainan Island. From 4 December 1941 to the end of the year, Shirakumo covered the landings of Japanese troops in Malaya and in "Operation B" (the invasion of British Borneo). She rescued survivors from the torpedoed destroyer Sagiri on 23 December.

In February 1942, Shirakumo was part of the escort for the heavy cruiser Chōkai during "Operation L" (the invasion of Banka and Palembang in the Netherlands East Indies. On 14 February she sank a British cable-laying ship off Singapore.

Subsequently, Shirakumo was assigned to "Operation J" (the invasion of Java) and on 1 March at the Battle of Sunda Strait she assisted in the sinking of the Royal Australian Navy cruiser HMAS Perth the United States Navy cruiser USS Houston and the Dutch destroyer HNLMS Evertsen. On 10 March, Shirakumo was reassigned to Destroyer Division 20 of Destroyer Squadron 3 of the IJN 1st Fleet, and subsequently was involved in "Operation T" (the invasion of northern Sumatra) on 12 March and "Operation D" (the invasion of the Andaman Islands on 23 March. On 6 April during the Indian Ocean raids, Shirakumo, together with Kumano and Suzuya sank the British steamships Silksworth, Autolycus, Malda and Shinkuang and the American steamship Exmoor. From 13–22 April Shirakumo returned via Singapore and Camranh Bay to Kure Naval Arsenal, for maintenance.

During the Battle of Midway, Shirakumo was part of "Operation AL" - the diversionary invasion of the Aleutian Islands. In July 1942, Shirakumo sailed from Amami-Ōshima to Mako Guard District, Singapore, Sabang and Mergui for a projected second Indian Ocean raid. The operation was cancelled due to the Guadalcanal campaign, and Shirakumo was ordered to Truk instead. In August, Shirakumo was used for “Tokyo Express” high speed transport missions in the Solomon Islands. On 28 August, after having aborted a troop transport mission to Guadalcanal, Shirakumo suffered heavy damage in an attack by American dive bombers, and was left dead in the water with a direct hit to her engine room, although only two crewmen were wounded. She was towed by the destroyer Amagiri, followed by the minelayer Tsugaru to Shortland Island, and by the tanker Koa Maru back to Truk for emergency repairs, which enabled her to limp back to Kure by 8 October.

After repairs were completed by 1 April 1943, Shirakumo was reassigned to Destroyer Division 9 of Destroyer Squadron 1 in the IJN 5th Fleet, for patrols and escort missions off Hokkaidō and the Chishima Islands. On 6 June 1943, she collided with the destroyer Numakaze in heavy fog off Paramushiro, and was forced to put into Hakodate for repairs, which were not completed to the end of September, when she resumed her patrol and escort duties.

On 16 March 1944, after departing Kushiro in northern Hokkaidō with a troop convoy for Uruppu Island, Shirakumo was torpedoed by the US submarine USS Tautog 170 nautical miles (310 km) east of Muroran at position 42°25′N 144°55′E. She sank instantly; there were no survivors.

On 31 March 1944, Shirakumo was struck from the navy list.
