= Tama Maru =

Tama Maru may refer to the following ships:

- Japanese minesweeper Tama Maru (1936), Japanese World War II-era auxiliary minesweeper
- Japanese minesweeper Tama Maru (1939), Japanese World War II-era auxiliary minesweeper
- Japanese minesweeper Tama Maru No. 2, Japanese World War II-era auxiliary minesweeper
- Japanese minesweeper Tama Maru No. 3, Japanese World War II-era auxiliary minesweeper
- Japanese minesweeper Tama Maru No. 5, Japanese World War II-era auxiliary minesweeper
- Japanese minesweeper Tama Maru No. 6, Japanese World War II-era auxiliary minesweeper
- Japanese minesweeper Tama Maru No. 7, Japanese World War II-era auxiliary minesweeper
