= Yokohama Maru (1912) =

History
- Name: Yokohama Maru
- Owner: Nippon Yusen Kabushiki Kaisha (1912–??); Imperial Japanese Army (??-1942)
- Builder: Mitsubishi Dockyard & Engine Works, Nagaski
- Launched: 30 January 1912
- Fate: Sunk by United States Navy aircraft

General characteristics
- Tonnage: 6,143 GRT
- Length: 406 feet (124 m)
- Beam: 49 feet (15 m)
- Draught: 27 feet (8 m)

Yokohama Maru was a 6,143 GRT passenger and cargo vessel built by Mitsubishi Dockyard & Engine Works, Nagaski for Nippon Yusen Kabushiki Kaisha and launched in 1912. The ship was used on the Guam to Japan route. She was requisitioned by the Imperial Japanese Army and fitted out as a troop transport.

== Invasion of Guam ==
On 8 December 1941, she was assigned to Operation "G", the invasion of Guam as one of 10 transports carrying Major General Horii Tomitaro's 55th Infantry Corps. The naval operation was headed by the 4th Fleet operating out of Saipan consisting of minelayer Tsugaru as flagship; seaplane tender Kiyokawa Maru; 4 cruisers, Aoba, Furutaka, Kako, Kinugasa (Cruiser Division 6, detached from 1st Fleet); and 4 destroyers, Oboro (detached from Carrier Division 5 of the IJN 1st Air Fleet), and Kikuzuki, Uzuki, and Yūzuki (Destroyer Division 23, detached from Carrier Division 2, IJN 1st Air Fleet). The remaining ships all belonged to the Fifth Base Force, 4th Fleet consisting of Gunboat Division 7 (Hirotama Maru, Shotoku Maru), Subchaser Division 59 (subchasers Shonan Maru No. 5, Shonan Maru No. 6; netlayer Shofuku Maru), Subchaser Division 60 (subchasers Kyo Maru No. 8, Kyo Maru No. 10; netlayer Shuko Maru), and Minesweeper Division 15 (Fumi Maru No. 2, Seki Maru No. 3).

== Invasion of Salamaua–Lae ==
On 10 March 1942, while being unloaded off Salamaua, Yokohama Maru was attacked as part of the invasion fleet at Lae and Salamaua and was sunk at 07°01′S 147°07′E. She was the first ever victim of American aerial torpedo Mk. 13
