= Kamikawa Maru-class seaplane tender =

Japanese cargo ship

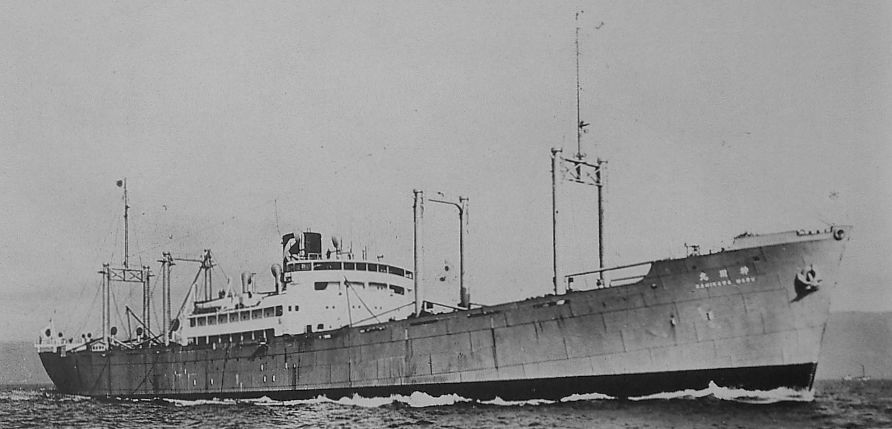
- Kamikawa Maru

Class overview
- Name: Kamikawa Maru-class Cargo ship
- Builders: Kawasaki Shipbuilding Corporation
- Operators: Kawasaki Line; Imperial Japanese Navy; Imperial Japanese Army; Kōbe Line
- Built: 1936–1940
- In commission: 1937–1969
- Planned: 5
- Completed: 5
- Lost: 4
- Retired: 1 (Kiyokawa Maru)

General characteristics
- Type: Cargo ship/Seaplane tender
- Displacement: 6,853 to 6,872 long tons (6,963 to 6,982 t) gross
- Length: 145.0 m (475 ft 9 in) Lpp; 146.15 m (479 ft 6 in) waterline
- Beam: 19.0 m (62 ft 4 in)
- Draught: 8.23 m (27 ft 0 in)
- Propulsion: Kamikawa Maru; 1 × MAN-Kawasaki D7Z-70/120T diesel; single shaft, 9,137 bhp; Kiyokawa Maru; 1 × MAN-Kawasaki D7Z-70/120T diesel; single shaft, 8,810 bhp; Kimikawa Maru; 1 × MAN-Kawasaki D7Z-70/120T diesel; single shaft, 8,867 bhp; Kunikawa Maru; 1 × MAN-Kawasaki D7Z-70/120T diesel; single shaft, 8,880 bhp; Hirokawa Maru; 1 × MAN-Kawasaki D8Z-70/120T diesel, single shaft, 9,980 bhp
- Speed: Kamikawa Maru and Kiyokawa Maru; 19.5 knots (22.4 mph; 36.1 km/h); Kimikawa Maru and Kunikawa Maru; 19.4 knots (22.3 mph; 35.9 km/h); Hirokawa Maru; 19.2 knots (22.1 mph; 35.6 km/h)
- Capacity: 650,000 ft^{3} (18,000 m^{3}) freight as cargo ship
- Crew: 65 as cargo ship
- Armament: Kamikawa Maru, 1937; 2 × 4.7 in (120 mm)/45 AA guns; 2 × 7.7 mm machine guns; Kiyokawa Maru, Kimikawa Maru and Kunikawa Maru, 1941; 2 × 150 mm (5.9 in) L/40 naval guns; 2 × 76.2 mm (3.00 in) L/23.5 AA guns; 4 × Type 96 25 mm AA guns; 2 × 7.7 mm machine guns; Hirokawa Maru, 1941; 6 × Type 88 75 mm AA guns; 4 × Type 98 20 mm AA guns
- Aircraft carried: Kamikawa Maru, Kiyokawa Maru, Kimikawa Maru and Kunikawa Maru; up to 12 float plane
- Aviation facilities: Kamikawa Maru, Kiyokawa Maru, Kimikawa Maru and Kunikawa Maru; catapult and deck

The Kamikawa Maru-class cargo ship (神川丸型貨物船, Kamikawa Maru-gata Kamotsusen) was a type of cargo ship of Japan, serving during the 1930s and World War II. Four of the five ships of the class were converted to seaplane tenders during the war.

== History ==
In 1930, the Ōsaka Mercantile Steamship Co.Ltd. (O.S.K. Lines) put into service the Kinai Maru-class cargo ship on the Japan-New York route. Competing Japanese steamship companies produced and placed their own cargo ships on the North America route.

In 1936, the Kawasaki Line built four Kamikawa Maru-class ships. They had much higher cruising speeds and capacity than their competitors. However, they were commandeered in sequence and did not survive to the end of the war.

== Ships in class ==
Construction data
Name	Kanji	Builder	Laid down	Launched	Completed	Owner
Kamikawa Maru	神川丸	Kawasaki, Kōbe Shipyard	5 August 1936	13 December 1936	15 March 1937	Kawasaki Line
Kiyokawa Maru	聖川丸	Kawasaki, Kōbe Shipyard	21 October 1936	16 February 1937	15 May 1937	Kawasaki Line; Kōbe Line (and after 15 August 1963)
Kimikawa Maru	君川丸	Kawasaki, Kōbe Shipyard	2 November 1936	11 March 1937	15 July 1937	Kawasaki Line
Kunikawa Maru	國川丸	Kawasaki, Kōbe Shipyard	11 March 1937	12 June 1937	1 November 1937	Kawasaki Line
Hirokawa Maru	宏川丸	Kawasaki, Kōbe Shipyard	6 April 1939	10 May 1940	12 October 1940	Kawasaki Line

== Service ==
Kamikawa Maru
Date	Event
18 September 1937	Enlisted by the Navy
19 September 1937	classified to Auxiliary seaplane tender
1 October 1937	Assigned to the 3rd Fleet
1 December 1937	Assigned to the 3rd Carrier Division, 3rd Fleet
1 February 1938	3rd Carrier Division was transferred to the 5th Fleet
1 July 1938	Assigned to the 3rd Fleet
15 December 1938	Classified to Auxiliary aircraft transport
15 November 1939	Classified to Auxiliary seaplane tender, assigned to the China Area Fleet
1 April 1940	Assigned to the 2nd China Expeditionary Fleet
15 November 1940	Assigned to the 6th Carrier Division, Combined Fleet
10 April 1941	Assigned to the 12th Carrier Division, 3rd Fleet
7 December 1941	Sortie for the Battle of Malaya
10 March 1942	Assigned to the 4th Fleet
18 April 1942	Sortie for Operation MO
20 May 1942	Assigned to the 11th Carrier Division, Southeast Area Fleet
28 May 1942	Sortie for Operation MI
15 June 1942	Sortie for Operation AL
14 July 1942	11th Carrier Division was moved to the 2nd Fleet
23 August 1942	Sortie for the Guadalcanal Campaign
1 April 1943	11th Carrier Division was moved to the Southeast Area Fleet
15 April 1943	11th Carrier Division was disbanded
29 May 1943	Sunk by USS Scamp at northwest of Kavieng 01°36′S 150°24′E
15 July 1943	Removed from naval ship list and discharged

Kiyokawa Maru
Date	Event
28 September 1941	Enlisted by the Navy
5 October 1941	Classified to Auxiliary seaplane tender
10 November 1941	Assigned to the 4th Fleet
6 December 1941	Sortie for the Battle of Guam
23 December 1941	Sortie for the Battle of Wake Island
6 January 1942	Sortie for the Battle of Rabaul
1 December 1942	Classified to Auxiliary transport, and assigned to the Yokosuka Naval District
1 April 1943	Classified to Auxiliary seaplane tender, and assigned to the 2nd Southern Expeditionary Fleet, Southwest Area Fleet
1 July 1943	Assigned to the Southwest Area Fleet
1 October 1943	Classified to Auxiliary transport
1 June 1944	Assigned to the Yokosuka Naval District
14 July 1944	Entry to the Hi-68 Convoy
20 August 1944	Entry to the TaMo-26 Convoy
14 November 1944	Entry to the Convoy Hi-81
8 December 1944	Entry to the MaMo-25 Convoy
29 January 1945	Entry to the Hi-93 Convoy
11 February 1945	Entry to the Hi-88C Convoy
25 February 1945	Entry to the TaMo-44 Convoy
16 March 1945	Entry to the MoTa-43 Convoy
1 April 1945	Entry to the TaMo-53 Convoy
20 July 1945	Sunk by air raid at Kaminoseki
30 November 1945	Discharged
9 December 1947	Refloated
20 October 1949	Repairs were completed
15 August 1963	Sold to Kōbe Line
14 December 1969	Scrapped

Kimikawa Maru
Date	Event
6 July 1941	Enlisted by the Navy
25 July 1941	Classified to Auxiliary seaplane tender
1 September 1941	Assigned to the 5th Fleet
10 December 1941	Assigned to the 21st Division, 5th Fleet
1 September 1941	Removed from 21st Division
8 June 1942	Sortie for the Operation AL
1 October 1943	Classified to Auxiliary transport and assigned to the Northeast Area Fleet
20 November 1943	Assigned to the Combined Fleet
13 July 1944	Entry to the Hi-69 Convoy
2 October 1944	Entry to the Hi-76 Convoy
21 October 1944	Entry to the Mata-30 Convoy
23 October 1944	Sunk by submarine USS Sawfish at WNW of Cape Bojeador 18°58′S 118°40′E
10 December 1944	Removed from naval ship list and discharged

Kunikawa Maru
Date	Event
31 October 1941	Enlisted by the Navy
10 November 1941	Classified to Auxiliary transport
10 December 1941	Assigned to the Combined Fleet
14 July 1942	Classified to Auxiliary seaplane tender, and assigned to the 4th Fleet
24 August 1942	Sortie for the Solomon Islands campaign
1 April 1943	Assigned to the 11th Carrier Division, Southeast Area Fleet
15 April 1943	Removed from 11th Carrier Division
3 May 1943	Entry to the No. 2023 Convoy
8 May 1943	Entry to the No. 4508 Convoy
1 June 1943	Entry to the No. 3601A Convoy
5 August 1943	Entry to the No. 4805 Convoy
15 September 1943	Entry to the No. 3914 Convoy
28 September 1943	Entry to the No. 1292 Convoy
1 October 1943	Classified to Auxiliary transport, and assigned to the Kure Naval District
16 October 1943	Entry to the O-602B Convoy
1 November 1943	Entry to the No. 7101 Convoy
21 December 1943	Entry to the Hi-27 Convoy
20 March 1944	Entry to the H-22 Convoy
29 March 1944	Struck a naval mine at Balikpapan
8 May 1944	Temporary repairs were completed, however struck a naval mine once again; Later sank in shallow water
26 September 1944	Refloated and temporary repairs were completed
21 May 1945	Sunk by air raid
30 November 1945	Discharged
3 May 1947	Removed from naval ship list

Hirokawa Maru
Date	Event
8 February 1941	Enlisted by the Army; Classified to Nucleus Anti-Aircraft vessel
8 December 1941	Sortie for the Battle of Malaya; Landed the Andō Detachment, 5th Infantry Division at Pattani
20 February 1942	Sortie for the Dutch East Indies campaign; Landed the 16th Army at Palembang
23 March 1942	Sortie for the Invasion of the Andaman Islands; Landed the one battalion of the 18th Division at Ross Island
14 October 1942	Sortie for the Guadalcanal Campaign
15 October 1942	Landed the one battalion of the 38th Division at Guadalcanal; Damaged by U.S. aircraft and artillery, sunk by destroyer USS Meade at Tassafaronga Point

== Photos ==
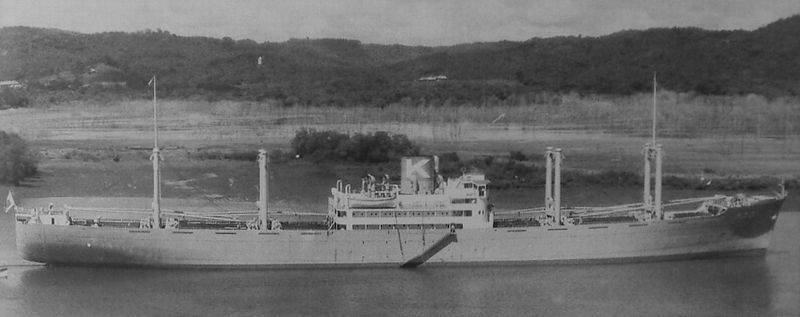
Kawasaki Line Kiyokawa Maru

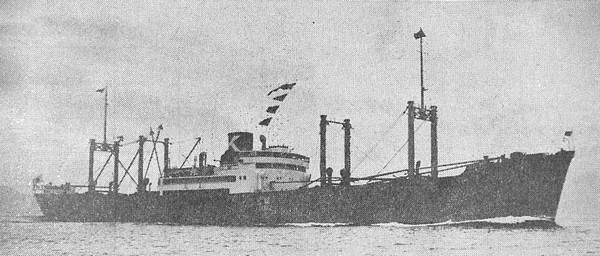
Kawasaki Line Kimikawa Maru

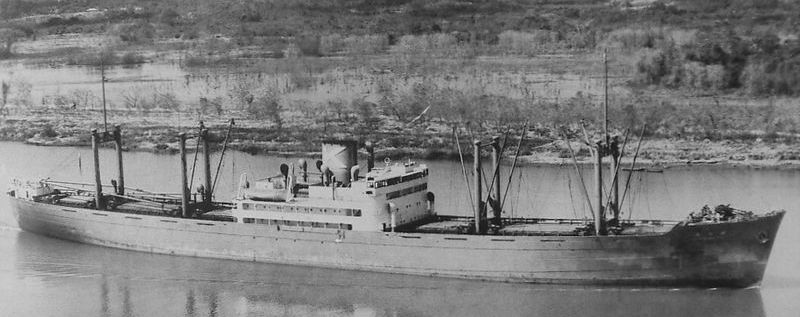
Kawasaki Line Kunikawa Maru

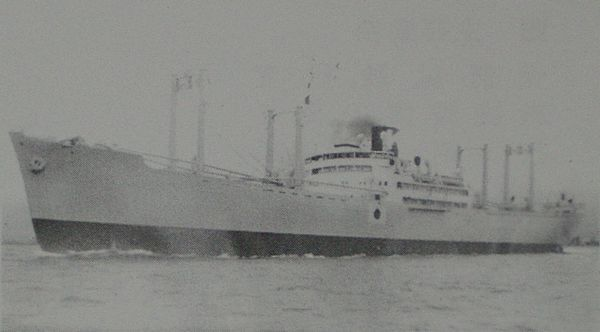
Kawasaki Line Hirokawa Maru
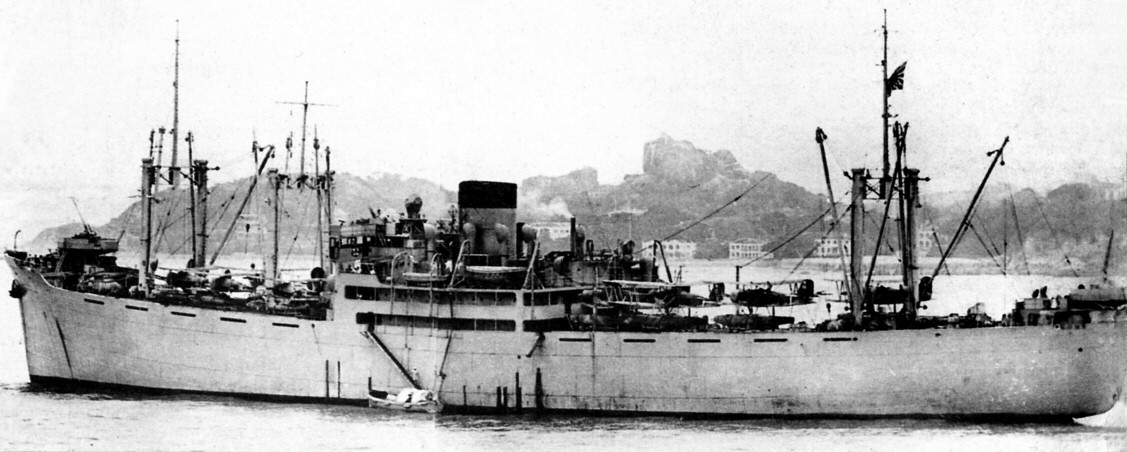
IJN Kamikawa Maru circa 1939 at Xiamen

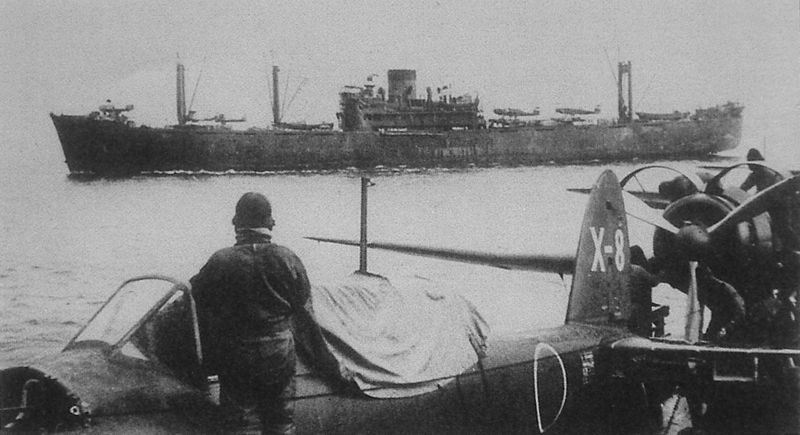
IJN Kamikawa Maru in June 1942 at Kiska

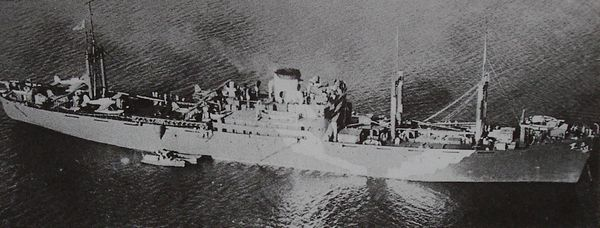
IJN Kimikawa Maru in Autumn 1942 at Ōminato Naval Base

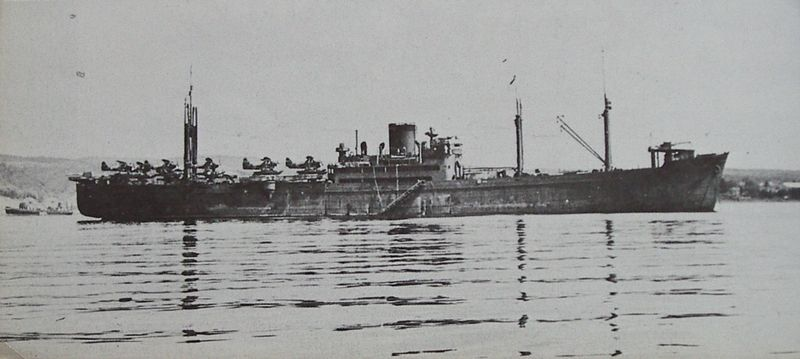
IJN Kimikawa Maru in April 1943 at Ōminato Naval Base
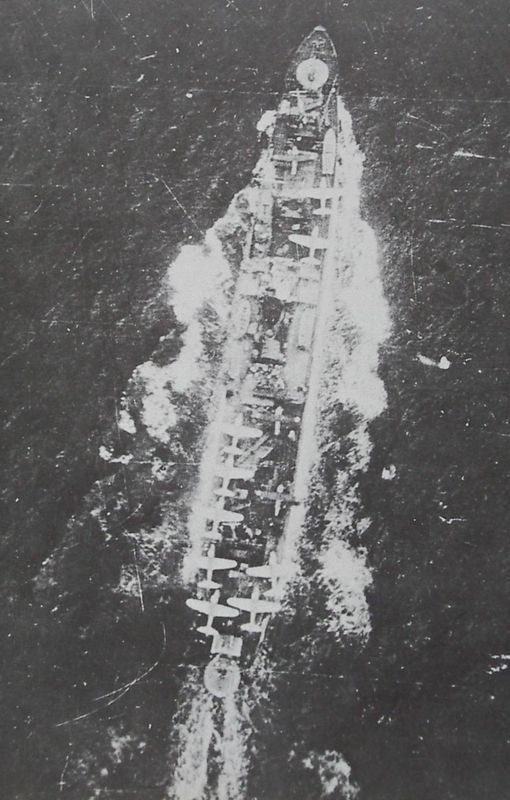
IJN Kamikawa Maru-class in 1943

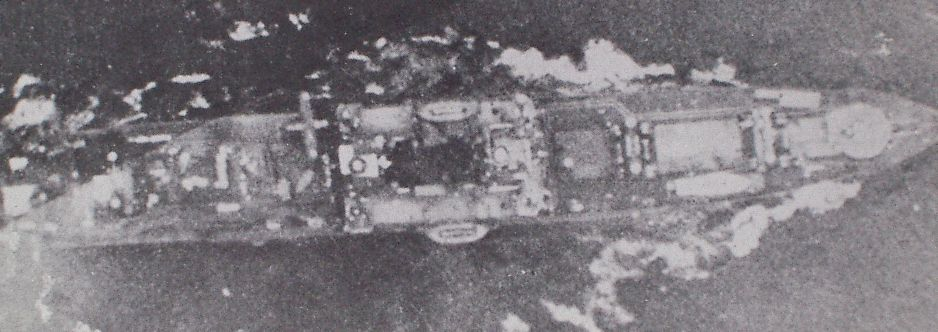
IJN Kimikawa Maru in Summer 1943

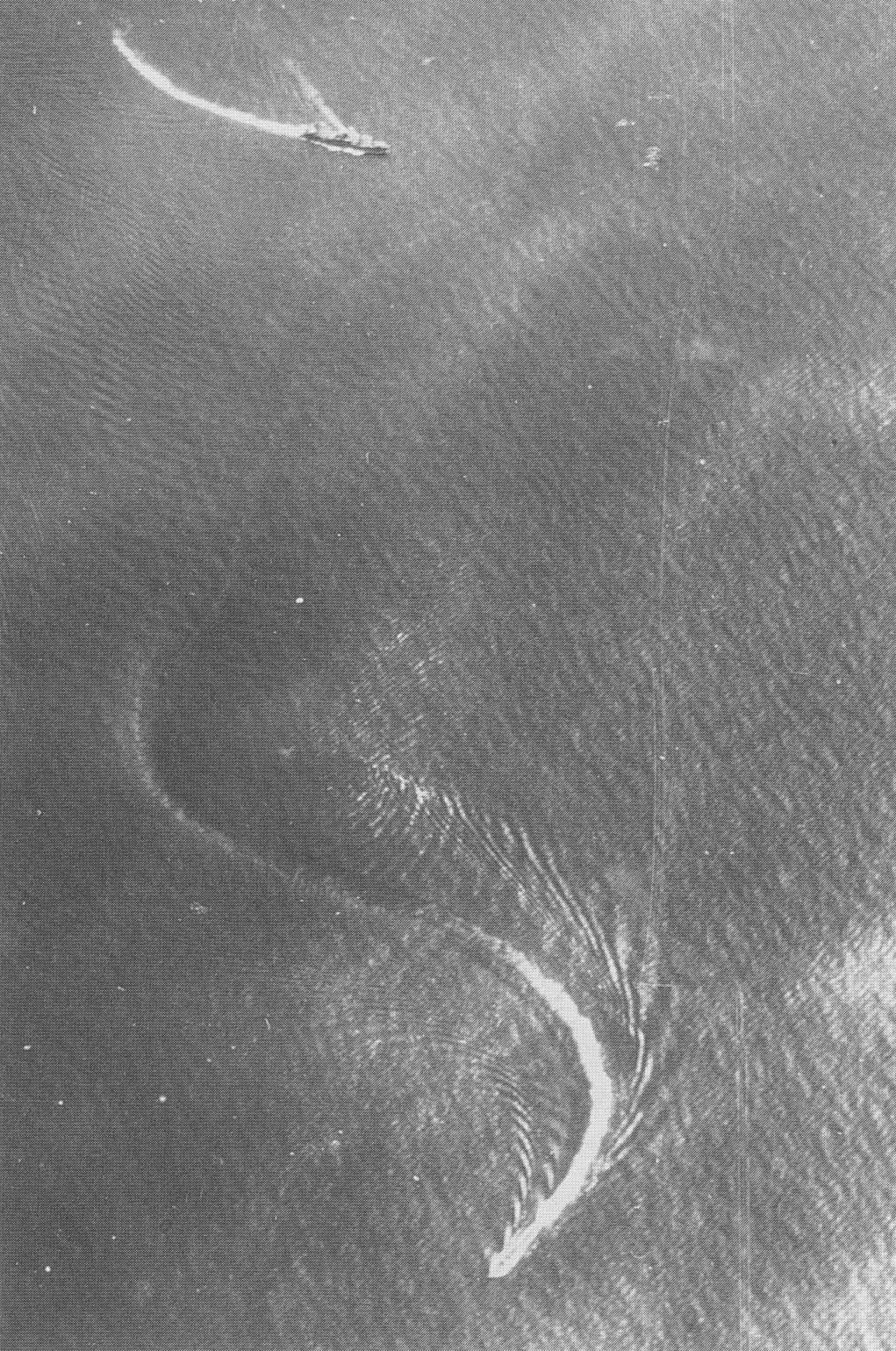
IJN Kiyokawa Maru (above) and Mochizuki on 10 March 1942, manoeuvring to avoid attacks by aircraft from USS Yorktown

== Bibliography ==
- Tashirō Iwashige, The visual guide of Japanese wartime merchant marine, "Dainippon Kaiga". Archived from the original on 2002-12-07. (Japan), May 2009
- Shinshichirō Komamiya, The Wartime Convoy Histories, "Shuppan Kyōdōsha". Archived from the original on 2011-07-22. (Japan), October 1987
- Monthly Ships of the World, "Kaijinsha". (Japan)
  - No. 481, Special issue Vol. 40, History of Japanese aircraft carriers, May 1994
  - No. 525, June 1997
  - No. 600, September 2002
- Science of the Ships No. 403, Ministry of Transport, May 1982
- The Maru Special, Japanese Naval Vessels No. 25, Japanese seaplane tenders w/ auxiliary seaplane tenders, "Ushio Shobō". (Japan), March 1979
