= SS China Maru =

Japanese cargo ship

History

Japan
- Name: China Maru
- Owner: Kawasaki Kisen Kabushiki Kaisha (1920–1941); Imperial Japanese Navy (1941–1944)
- Builder: Kawasaki Dockyard Company, Kobe
- Launched: 1920
- Fate: Sunk by US aircraft on 21 September 1944

General characteristics
- Tonnage: 5,870 GRT
- Length: 385 feet (117 m)
- Beam: 51 feet (16 m)
- Draught: 36 feet (11 m)
- Propulsion: Triple expansion engines (437 nhp)
- Speed: 11 knots (20 km/h; 13 mph)

SS China Maru was a 5,870-gross register ton cargo ship built by Kawasaki Dockyard Company, Kobe, for Kawasaki Kisen KK in 1920.

== History ==
The cargo ship ran aground off Balum Island, Feni Islands, Papua New Guinea, on 26 June 1939, while steaming to Sydney from Yokohama, and was later refloated. She was requisitioned in 1941 by the Imperial Japanese Navy for use during World War II.

== Invasion of Guam ==
On 8 December 1941, she was assigned to Operation "G", the invasion of Guam as one of 10 transports carrying Major General Horii Tomitaro's 55th Infantry Corps. The naval operation was headed by the 4th Fleet operating out of Saipan consisting of minelayer Tsugaru as flagship; seaplane tender Kiyokawa Maru; 4 cruisers, Aoba, Furutaka, Kako, Kinugasa (Cruiser Division 6, detached from 1st Fleet); and 4 destroyers, Oboro (detached from Carrier Division 5 of the IJN 1st Air Fleet), and Kikuzuki, Uzuki, and Yūzuki (Destroyer Division 23, detached from Carrier Division 2, IJN 1st Air Fleet). The remaining ships all belonged to the Fifth Base Force, 4th Fleet consisting of Gunboat Division 7 (Hirotama Maru, Shotoku Maru), Subchaser Division 59 (subchasers Shonan Maru No. 5, Shonan Maru No. 6; netlayer Shofuku Maru), Subchaser Division 60 (subchasers Kyo Maru No. 8, Kyo Maru No. 10; netlayer Shuko Maru), and Minesweeper Division 15 (Fumi Maru No. 2, Seki Maru No. 3).

== Invasion of Salamaua–Lae ==
On 10 March 1942, during the invasion of Lae-Salamaua, China Maru was damaged by SBD aircraft from the United States Navy aircraft carriers USS Lexington and USS Yorktown off Lae, New Guinea.

== Fate ==
On 21 September 1944, while anchored off Manila, Philippines, China Maru was hit by bombs from US Navy Task Force 38.1, 38.2, and 38.3 aircraft, and sunk at 14°35′N 120°55′E.

== See also ==
- Foreign commerce and shipping of Empire of Japan
