= Japan–Liechtenstein relations =

- Japan: Liechtenstein

Foreign relations exist between Japan and Liechtenstein. Both countries established diplomatic relations in June 1996. Since then, the relations between the two countries have been stable.

Japan does not have an embassy in Liechtenstein, but there is an honorary consulate located in Schaan. The Japanese ambassador to Switzerland, located in Bern, is also accredited to Liechtenstein. Similarly, the Swiss embassy in Tokyo also represents Liechtenstein.

== Diplomatic and economic cooperation ==
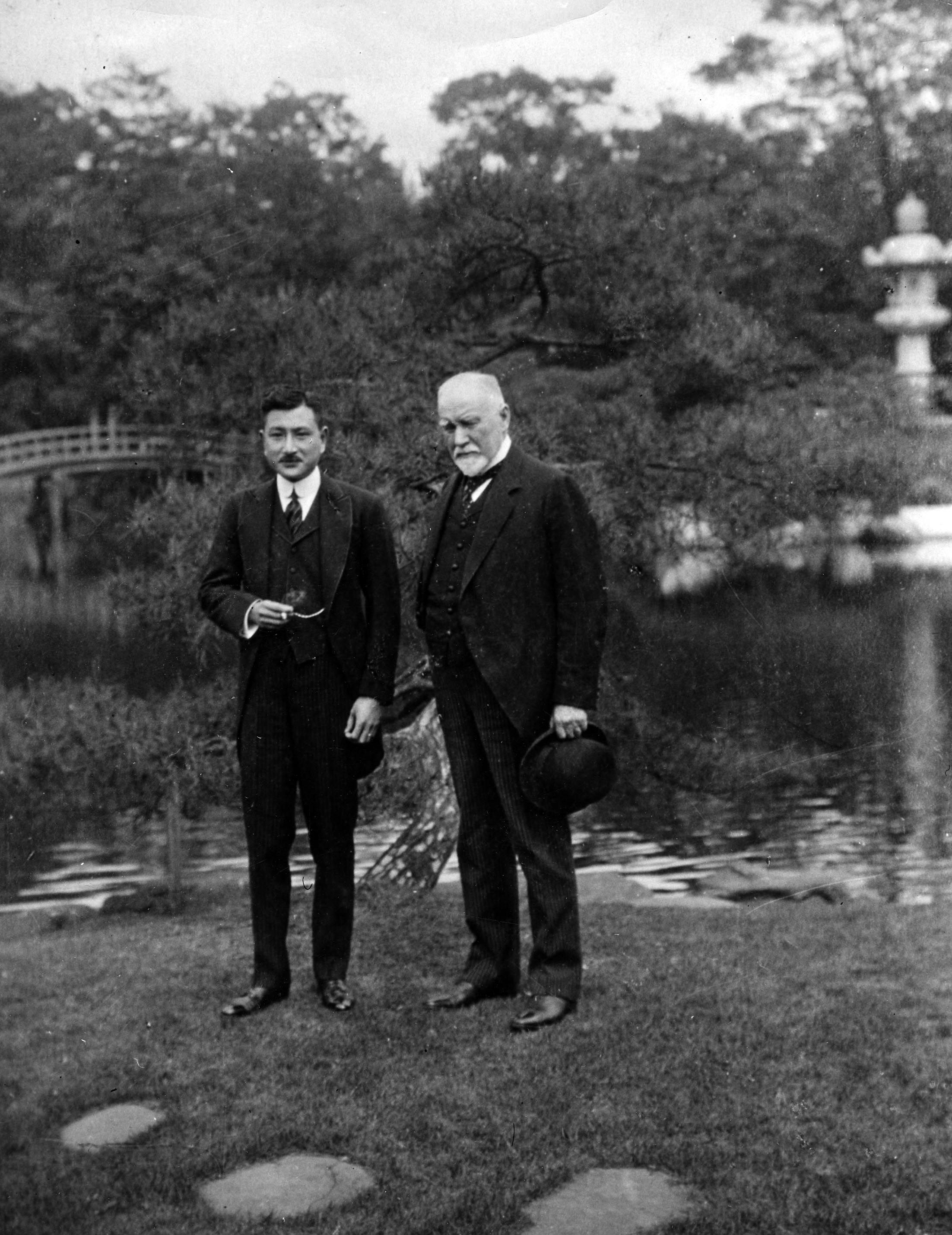
Hermann Kessler and Toranosuke Furukawa in 1921.

Economic cooperation between the two countries go back to 1887 with the starting of engineering missions from Liechtenstein to Japan. Vaduz-born engineer Hermann Kessler would contribute to the building of the first hydroelectric power plant in Japan, Keage power plant [ja], in 1890.

Following the Fukushima nuclear accident in 2011, Liechtenstein, in accordance with Switzerland, imposed food import restrictions on Japan in fear of radioactive contamination. These restrictions were lifted in August 2023 following a corresponding lifting by the European Union.

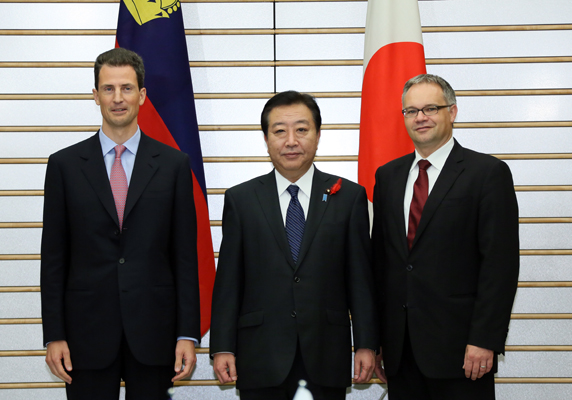
Alois, Hereditary Prince of Liechtenstein, Yoshihiko Noda and Klaus Tschütscher in Vaduz, 2011

== Agreements ==
The two countries signed a tax treaty on 5 July 2012, intended to prevent tax evasion in their respective countries.

== High level visits and diplomatic meetings ==
- In 1984, Prince Naruhito visited Liechtenstein. This was the first time a Japanese royal had visited the country.
- In 1986, then Hereditary Prince Hans-Adam and his wife Hereditary Princess Marie visited Japan.
- In July 2012, Prime Minister of Japan Yoshihiko Noda met with Alois, Hereditary Prince of Liechtenstein and Prime Minister of Liechtenstein Klaus Tschütscher in Vaduz. They discussed a tax treaty between the two countries, which was signed on 5 July 2012.
