= Kure Naval District =

Administrative unit of Imperial Japanese Navy

Kure Naval District (呉鎮守府, Kure chinjufu) was the second of four main administrative districts of the pre-war Imperial Japanese Navy. Its territory included the Inland Sea of Japan and the Pacific coasts of southern Honshū from Wakayama to Yamaguchi prefectures, eastern and northern Kyūshū and Shikoku.

The area of the Kure Naval District encompassed Hashirajima Anchoring Area located at the south end of Hiroshima Bay, 30-40 kilometers southwest of Kure. When not in need of repairs ships usually anchored in this area to free up pier space at Kure. Hashirajima was also a major staging area for fleet operations.

Tokuyama port, was also part of Kure Naval District, and had the largest fuel depot in the Japanese Navy.

== History ==
The location of Kure within the sheltered Inland Sea of Japan was recognized of strategic importance in controlling the sea lanes around western Japan by the Meiji government and early Imperial Japanese Navy. With the formation of the navy in 1886, Japan was divided into five naval districts for recruiting and supply. During the administrative re-organization of the Japanese Navy in 1889, Kure was designated as the "Second Naval District" (第二海軍区, dai-ni kaigunku), and its harbor was dredged, a breakwater constructed and docking facilities for warships were established. The following year, work began on the Kure Naval Arsenal, which would eventually expand to become one of the largest shipyards in Japan for the construction of large capital ships. The facilities of Kure Naval District included armories, production factories for torpedoes, naval mines and naval artillery (and associated ammunition), and also a naval hospital and training centers.

The Imperial Japanese Naval Academy and Naval Staff College were relocated from Tokyo to nearby Etajima, and thus also came within the borders of the Kure Naval District, but did not come under the command of Kure Naval District itself.

In 1920, the Imperial Japanese Navy established its main submarine base and submarine warfare training school in Kure. An air wing was established in 1932, and a telecommunications center in 1937.

At the time of the attack on Pearl Harbor in 1941, Kure Naval District encompassed the following

- Kure Naval District HQ
  - Kure Naval Base
    - Kure Naval Guard Unit
      - Destroyer Yakaze
      - Submarines I-52, Ro-30, Ro-31, Ro-32
      - Minelayer Katsuriki
      - Kaibokan Yakumo
    - Kure Naval Arsenal
    - Kure Naval Hospital
    - Kure Naval Prison
    - Kure Naval Fuel Deport
    - Kure Special Naval Landing Forces
  - Kure Submarine Base
  - Otake Naval Infantry Barracks
  - Tokuyama Naval Fuel Depot
  - Kure Security Squadron
    - C.M. cruiser Saigon Maru, Bangkok Maru
    - C.M. gunboat Hong Kong Maru
  - Kure Local Defence Squadron
    - Destroyer Division 13
      - Destroyer Wakatake, Kuretake, Sanae
    - No.13-class submarine chasers CH-19, CH-20, CH-21
    - C.M. cruiser Kinjōsan Maru
    - Minesweeper Division 31
      - C.M. minesweeper Takunan Maru No. 3, Takunan Maru No. 8, Tama Maru, Tama Maru No. 6, Tama Maru No. 7, Ōi Maru
    - Minesweeper Division 33
      - C.M. minesweeper Bizan Maru, Meshima Maru, Tokuhō Maru No. 5, Dai-2-Gō Asahi Maru, Kiri Maru No. 5, Miyo Maru
    - Saeki Defence Unit
    - Shimonoseki Defence Unit
  - 12th Combined Air Group (training)
    - Ōita Naval Air Group
    - Usa Naval Air Group
    - Hakata Naval Air Group
    - Ōmura Naval Air Group
  - Kure Naval Air Group
  - Saeki Naval Air Group
  - Submarine Division Six (training)
    - Submarine Ro-57
    - Submarine Ro-58
    - Submarine Ro-59

Kure was heavily bombed by United States Navy and United States Army Air Forces bombers in the final stages of the Pacific War, and many of its facilities were destroyed. The Kure area came under occupation by Australian and British forces during the occupation of Japan, and was largely demilitarized. A small portion of the area continued to be occupied by the modern post-war Japanese Maritime Self-Defense Force, which has preserved a portion of the original red brick gates and couple of buildings as commemorative museums.

== List of commanders ==
=== Commanding officers ===
No.	Name	Portrait	Rank	Term of Office	
No.	Name	Portrait	Rank	Start	End
1	Nagayoshi Maki		Vice Admiral	26 September 1887	8 March 1889
2	Nakamuta Kuranosuke		Vice Admiral	8 March 1889	12 December 1892
3	Arichi Shinanojō		Vice Admiral	12 December 1892	12 May 1895
4	Abo Kiyoyasu		Vice Admiral	12 May 1895	26 February 1896
5	Inoue Yoshika		Vice Admiral	26 February 1896	20 May 1900
6	Shibayama Yahachi		Vice Admiral	20 May 1900	6 February 1905
7	Arima Shinichi		Vice Admiral	6 February 1905	2 February 1906
8	Yamanouchi Masuji		Vice Admiral	2 February 1906	1 December 1909
9	Katō Tomosaburō		Vice Admiral	1 December 1909	1 December 1913
10	Matsumoto Kazu		Vice Admiral	1 December 1913	25 March 1914
11	Yoshimatsu Motarō		Vice Admiral	25 March 1914	23 September 1915
12	Ijichi Suetaka		Vice Admiral	23 September 1915	1 December 1916
13	Katō Sadakichi		Vice Admiral Admiral (after 2 July 1918)	1 December 1916	1 December 1919
14	Murakami Kakuichi		Admiral	1 December 1919	27 July 1922
15	Suzuki Kantarō		Vice Admiral Admiral (after 3 August 1923)	27 July 1922	27 January 1924
16	Takeshita Isamu		Vice Admiral	27 January 1924	15 April 1925
17	Abo Kiyokazu		Vice Admiral	15 April 1925	10 December 1926
18	Taniguchi Naomi		Vice Admiral Admiral (after 2 April 1928)	10 December 1926	10 December 1928
19	Ōtani Koshirō		Vice Admiral	10 December 1928	11 November 1929
20	Taniguchi Naomi		Admiral	11 November 1929	11 June 1930
21	Nomura Kichisaburō		Vice Admiral	11 June 1930	1 December 1931
22	Yamanashi Katsunoshin		Vice Admiral Admiral (after 1 April 1932)	1 December 1931	1 December 1932
23	Nakamura Ryōzō		Vice Admiral Admiral (after 30 March 1934)	1 December 1932	10 May 1934
24	Fujita Hisanori		Vice Admiral Admiral (after 1 April 1936)	10 May 1934	1 December 1936
25	Katō Takayoshi		Vice Admiral	1 December 1936	15 November 1938
26	Shimada Shigetarō		Vice Admiral	15 November 1938	15 April 1940
27	Hibino Masaharu		Vice Admiral	15 April 1940	18 September 1941
28	Toyoda Soemu		Admiral	18 September 1941	10 November 1942
29	Takahashi Ibō		Vice Admiral	10 November 1942	21 June 1943
30	Nagumo Chūichi		Vice Admiral	21 June 1943	20 October 1943
31	Nomura Naokuni		Vice Admiral Admiral (after 1 March 1944)	20 October 1943	17 July 1944
32	Sawamoto Yorio		Admiral	17 July 1944	1 May 1945
33	Kanazawa Masao		Vice Admiral	1 May 1945	30 November 1945

=== Chief of Staff ===
- Rear-Admiral Shizuo Sato (1 April 1889 – 13 May 1890)
- Fleet Admiral Marquis Heihachiro Togo (13 May 1890 – 14 December 1891)
- Rear-Admiral Tokiyasu Yoshijima (14 December 1891 – 20 May 1893)
- Rear-Admiral Fukusaburo Hirao (20 May 1893 – 11 May 1895)
- Rear-Admiral Katsumi Miyoshi (11 May 1895 – 27 December 1897)
- Vice-Admiral Baron Masamichi Togo (27 December 1897 – 23 March 1899)
- Captain Isamu Yajima (23 March 1899 – 6 December 1900)
- Rear-Admiral Hisamaro Oinoue (6 December 1900 – 3 February 1904)
- Vice-Admiral Baron Tokutaro Nakamizo (3 February 1904 – 10 May 1905)
- Rear-Admiral Ichiro Nijima (10 May 1905 – 2 February 1906)
- Admiral Motaro Yoshimatsu (2 February 1906 – 22 November 1906)
- Rear-Admiral Shinjiro Uehara (22 November 1906 – 27 December 1907)
- Rear-Admiral Heitaro Takeuchi (27 December 1907 – 22 May 1910)
- Admiral Matahichiro Nawa (22 May 1910 – 20 April 1912)
- Admiral Kaneo Nomaguchi (20 April 1912 – 10 January 1913)
- Rear-Admiral Kishichiro Osawa (10 January 1913 – 1 December 1913)
- Vice-Admiral Naoe Nakano (1 December 1913 – 17 April 1914)
- Admiral Kenji Ide (17 April 1914 – 13 December 1915)
- Vice-Admiral Shibakichi Yamanaka (13 December 1915 – 13 July 1917)
- Vice-Admiral Junichi Matsumura (18 July 1917 – 1 December 1918)
- Vice-Admiral Shichigoro Saito (1 December 1918 – 1 December 1920)
- Vice-Admiral Yoshimoto Masaki (1 December 1920 – 1 December 1922)
- Vice-Admiral Naomoto Komatsu (1 December 1922 – 6 November 1923)
- Vice-Admiral Naotaro Nagasawa (6 November 1923 – 1 December 1924)
- Rear-Admiral Bekinari Kabayama (1 December 1924 – 16 December 1924)
- Vice-Admiral Tokujiro Tateno (16 December 1924 – 1 December 1926)
- Vice-Admiral Kiyohiro Ijichi (1 December 1926 – 10 December 1928)
- Admiral Koshirō Oikawa (10 December 1928 – 10 June 1930)
- Vice-Admiral Giichi Suzuki (10 June 1930 – 1 December 1931)
- Vice-Admiral Choji Inoue (1 December 1931 – 15 November 1932)
- Vice-Admiral Tokutaro Sumiyama (15 November 1932 – 15 November 1934)
- Vice-Admiral Umataro Tanimoto (15 November 1934 – 15 November 1935)
- Vice-Admiral Masaichi Niimi (15 November 1935 – 1 April 1936)
- Vice-Admiral Ichiro Sato (1 April 1936 – 1 December 1936)
- Vice-Admiral Takamoto Togari (1 December 1936 – 15 December 1938)
- Vice-Admiral Toshihisa Nakamura (15 December 1938 – 10 October 1939)
- Vice-Admiral Matome Ugaki (10 October 1939 – 20 August 1941)
- Vice-Admiral Torahiko Nakajima (20 August 1941 – 6 January 1943)
- Vice-Admiral Kengo Kobayashi (6 January 1943 – 11 June 1943)
- Vice-Admiral Shinzo Onishi (11 June 1943 – 9 September 1944)
- Vice-Admiral Shozo Hashimoto (10 September 1944 – 15 October 1945)
- Rear-Admiral Tametsugu Okada (15 October 1945 – 30 November 1945)

== See also ==
- Naval Academy Etajima
- Etajima
- Attack on Kure (March 1945)
- Attacks on Kure and the Inland Sea (July 1945)
