= Japanese seaplane tender Kamikawa Maru =

1936 Kamikawa Maru-class cargo ship

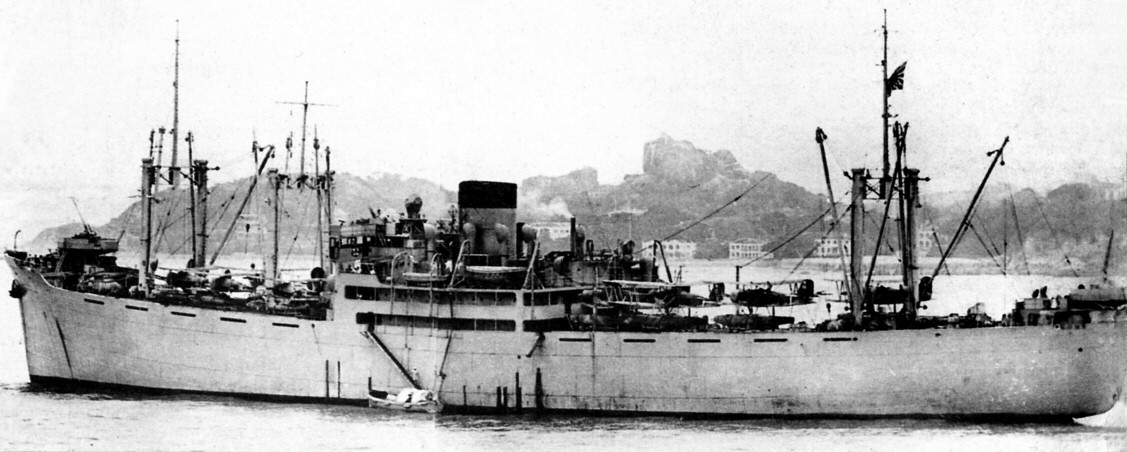
- Kamikawa Maru at Amoi, China sometime between 1938 and 1940.

History

Empire of Japan
- Name: Kamikawa Maru
- Builder: Kawasaki, Kōbe Shipyard
- Laid down: August 5, 1936
- Launched: December 13, 1936
- Acquired: March 15, 1937
- Commissioned: September 18, 1937
- Out of service: May 29, 1943
- Stricken: July 15, 1943
- Fate: Torpedoed and sunk May 29, 1943

General characteristics
- Class & type: Kamikawa Maru-class seaplane tender
- Displacement: 6,863 tons standard
- Length: 479 ft (146.0 m)
- Beam: 62 ft (18.9 m)
- Draft: 30 ft (9.1 m)
- Installed power: 7,600 shp (5,700 kW)
- Propulsion: 1 Kawasaki-MAN diesel engine, 1 shaft
- Speed: 28 knots (52 km/h; 32 mph)
- Armament: 2 x 5.9 in (150 mm) guns; 2 x Type 96 25 mm (0.98 in) AA guns; 2 x 13.2 mm (0.52 in) machine guns
- Aircraft carried: 12 seaplanes (24 stored)
- Aviation facilities: Two catapults, cranes

Kamikawa Maru (神川丸) was a seaplane tender in the Imperial Japanese Navy (IJN). The ship was initially built at Kawasaki's Kōbe Shipyard and launched on 13 December 1936 as a merchant vessel for the Kawasaki Kisen K. K. Line. On 18 September 1937 the IJN requisitioned her as an aircraft transport ship and she was refitted in 1939 as a seaplane tender. The ship subsequently saw service in the Second Sino-Japanese War and the Pacific Campaign of World War II. On May 29, 1943, Kamikawa Maru was torpedoed and sunk by the submarine USS Scamp approximately 250 miles (400 km) northwest of Kavieng, New Ireland at 01°36′S 150°24′E.
