= Palawan Passage =

Southeastern South China Sea natural waterway

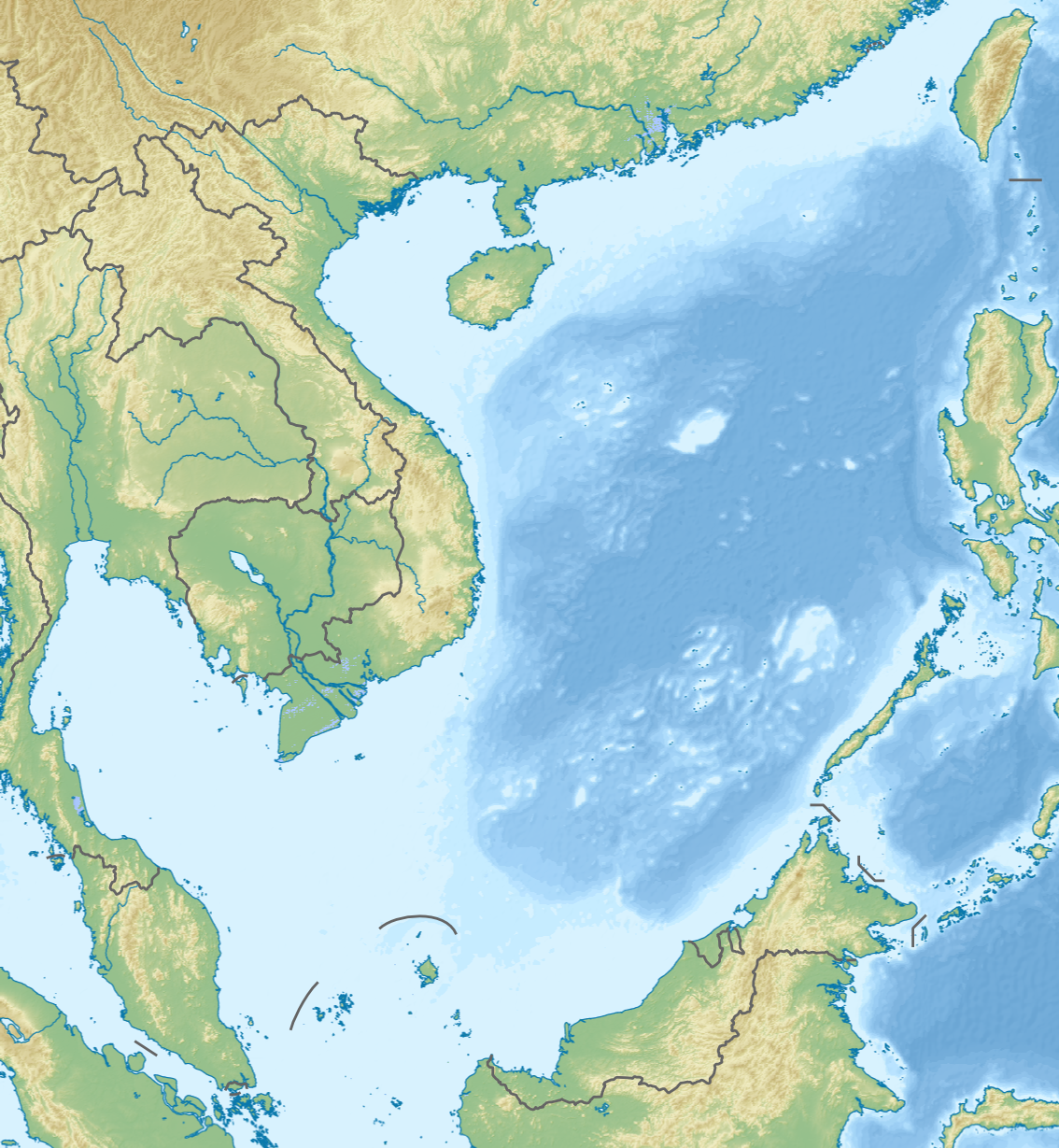
- Location within Philippines Location within South China Sea Location within Southeast Asia
- Location: Southeastern South China Sea
- Coordinates: 10°00′00″N 118°00′00″E
- Max. width: 40 nmi (74 km; 46 mi)
- Min. width: 35 nmi (65 km; 40 mi)
- Islands: None

The Palawan Passage is a natural waterway in the southeastern South China Sea to the west of the island of Palawan in the Philippine Islands. It is deep and relatively free of navigational hazards, making it an important shipping route. The entire Palawan Passage lies within the exclusive economic zone of the Philippines and in waters the Government of the Philippines refers to as the West Philippine Sea.

== Geography ==
The Palawan Passage is a deep-water channel in the southeastern South China Sea lying between the island of Palawan in the Philippine Islands to its east and Dangerous Ground, an area of the South China Sea, to its west. It is centered roughly around 10°N 118°E.

The Palawan Passage is 35 to 40 nautical miles (65 to 74 km; 40 to 46 mi) wide. Its eastern edge is marked by the 100-fathom (600 ft; 183 m) curve, which lies from 20 to 30 nautical miles (37 to 56 km; 23 to 35 mi) off the west coast of Palawan. The area between the coast of Palawan and the 100-fathom curve is a bank studded with reefs and shoals. To the west of the passage lies Dangerous Ground, a poorly surveyed and charted area of the southeastern South China Sea which includes numerous reefs, shoals, and rocks. In contrast to the dangers to navigation in the waters to its east and west, the Palawan Passage offers a deep-water, northeast–southwest shipping channel with only two hazards in its fairway, Royal Captain Shoal with its northernmost point at Observation Rock at 09°02′N 116°39′E, and Bombay Shoal with its northeastern extremity at Madagascar Rock at 09°26′N 116°56′E. The narrowest part of Palawan Passage lies between Royal Captain Shoal and the bank off Palawan.

Typhoons rarely cross the Palawan Passage, although when they pass to its north they can create strong winds and unsettled weather in the passage. Monsoon weather is somewhat unpredictable, but generally the passage enjoys its calmest weather in May and early June. In late June and July, weather becomes more unsettled, with periods of seven to ten days of rain, clouds, and squalls alternating with good weather. A strong west-southwesterly wind usually blows along the passage during September and October, with dark clouds and rain common. The weather is variable in November and December, with November particularly prone to strong southwesterly winds. During the northeast monsoon, between October and December, the passage tends to enjoy calmer weather than the area of the South China Sea to the west of Dangerous Ground. Currents in the Palawan Passage tend to be weak.

The Palawan Passage offers a direct route from the Indian Ocean via the Sunda Strait to Manila in the Philippines, as well as an alternative to routes farther west in the South China Sea between Manila, Hong Kong and Singapore for ships seeking to avoid some of the rougher weather associated with the northeast monsoon.

== History ==
During the Pacific campaign of World War II, United States Navy submarines operated in the Palawan Passage to attack Japanese shipping. On October 23, 1944, the first day of the Battle of Leyte Gulf, the U.S. submarines USS Darter (SS-227) and USS Dace (SS-247) attacked an Imperial Japanese Navy task force under the command of Vice Admiral Takeo Kurita as it passed through the Palawan Passage on its way from Brunei to the Sibuyan Sea and San Bernardino Strait. Darter torpedoed the heavy cruisers Atago — Kurita′s flagship — and Takao, sinking Atago and badly damaging Takao, and Dace torpedoed and sank the heavy cruiser Maya. Takao turned back for Brunei, and as Darter and Dace shadowed her, Darter was wrecked without loss of life on Bombay Shoal. Takao eventually reached Singapore, but was never seaworthy again.

In 2011, the Government of the Philippines began to refer to the waters of the South China Sea that lie within the exclusive economic zone of the Philippines as the West Philippine Sea. The entire Palawan Passage lies within the West Philippine Sea.

== Cultural site ==
The Tabon Caves, a cave system at Quezon on Palawan and the site of prehistoric human remains and jar burials, is located at Lipuun Point between two arms of the Palawan Passage, Malanut Bay to the east and Nakoda Bay to the west.
