= Japanese minesweeper Tama Maru No. 6 =

Naval vessel

- Japanese auxiliary minesweeper Tama Maru No. 6

History

Empire of Japan
- Name: Tama Maru No. 6
- Builder: Fujinagata Zosensho
- Laid down: 1 March 1936
- Launched: 20 July 1936
- Sponsored by: Taiyo Hogei
- Completed: 1 September 1936
- Acquired: Requisitioned by Imperial Japanese Navy, 11 April 1941
- Decommissioned: 31 March 1944
- Reclassified: Reclassified as a submarine chaser, 10 May 1944
- Stricken: 10 August 1944
- Identification: 42329
- Fate: Sunk, 8 August 1944
- Notes: Call sign: JIUK

General characteristics
- Class & type: Tama Maru-class
- Tonnage: 275 GRT
- Length: 38.4 m (126 ft 0 in) overall
- Beam: 7.3 m (23 ft 11 in)
- Draught: 4.1 m (13 ft 5 in)

Tama Maru No. 6 (Japanese: 第六玉丸) was an auxiliary minesweeper of the Imperial Japanese Navy during World War II. She was later reclassified as a submarine chaser.

== History ==
Tama Maru No. 6 was laid down on 1 March 1936 at the shipyard of Fujinagata Zosensho at the behest of shipping company, Taiyo Hogei. She was launched on 20 July 1936 and completed 1 September 1936. She was one of 8 ships built of her class (Tama Maru, Tama Maru No. 2, Tama Maru No. 3, Tama Maru No. 5, Tama Maru No. 6, Tama Maru No. 7, Tama Maru No. 8, Tama Maru No. 9 (later Nagato Maru)). On 11 April 1941, she was requisitioned by the Imperial Japanese Navy and converted to an auxiliary minesweeper under Reserve Lieutenant (Junior Grade) Nishida Hiroshi (西田祐志). Nishida served until 25 July 1943 when he was replaced by Reserve Lieutenant Ishii Hideo (石井英夫). On 10 May 1944, she was reclassified as a submarine chaser. On 8 August 1944, she was torpedoed and sunk in the Pacific Ocean off Honshu west of Chichi Jima (28°11′N 141°06′E) by USS Sterlet. She was removed from the navy list on 10 August 1944.
