= Siemens scandal =

1914 scandal in Japan

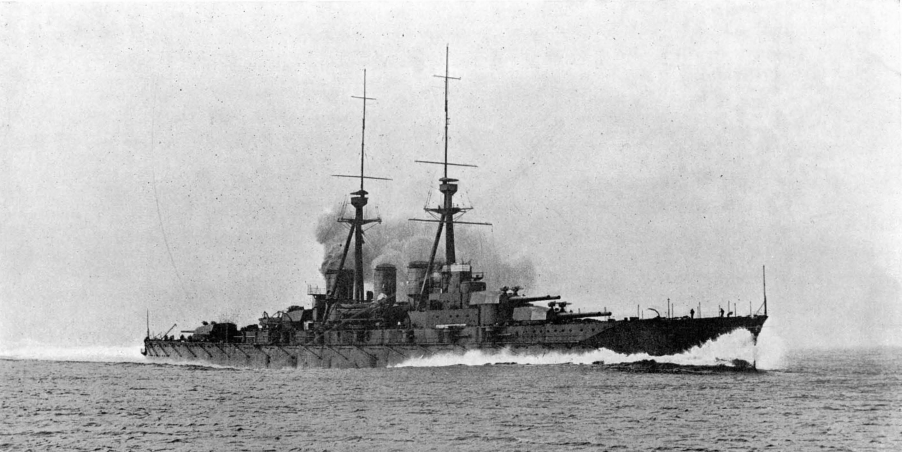
Procurement of the battlecruiser Kongō was the underlying issue of the Siemens Scandal

The Siemens Scandal (シーメンス事件, Shīmensu jiken) of January 1914 involved collusion between several high-ranking members of the Imperial Japanese Navy, the British company Vickers, and the German industrial conglomerate of Siemens. It was one of several spectacular political scandals of late Meiji and Taishō period Japanese politics, leading to the fall of the cabinet of Yamamoto Gonnohyoe.

== Kickbacks in shipbuilding ==
The Japanese navy engaged in a massive expansion program during the late Meiji period and early Taishō period. Many major orders of materiel (such as advanced warships and weaponry) were imported from Europe. Siemens had secured a virtual monopoly over Japanese naval contracts in return for a secret 15% kickback to the Japanese naval authorities responsible for procurement.

In 1914, the British firm of Vickers (via their Japanese agents Mitsui Bussan) offered the Japanese naval authorities a more lucrative deal, involving a 25% kickback, with 40,000 yen for Vice Admiral Matsumoto Kazu, the former Chief of the Navy Technical Department, specifically involving the procurement of the battlecruiser Kongō. (Note: Kongō was rebuilt in 1931 and redesignated as a battleship at that time.) When the German headquarters of Siemens found out about the deal, they sent a telegram to their Tokyo office demanding a clarification. An expatriate employee of the Siemens Tokyo office (Karl Richter) stole incriminating documents indicating that Siemens had previously paid a bribe of 1000 pounds sterling (~142,000 today) to the Japanese navy in return for a wireless contract, sold the documents to the Reuters news agency together with a copy of the telegram and fled back to Germany.

== Breaking of the scandal ==
The London Daily Telegraph newspaper edition of 21 January 1914 reported on the scandal, specifically the criminal proceedings against Karl Richter. Japanese newspapers, notably the Asahi Shimbun, immediately reported the details of the corruption scandal, and the issue was raised in the Diet by members of the Rikken Doshikai political party. Both the Army and Navy Intelligence Services and the Kempeitai launched investigations.

Another newspaper, Japan Weekly Chronicle, reported that an Admiral Fuji (Fujii Terugoro) of the navy procurement office had confessed to receiving payments from Vickers of a total 210,000 yen in 1911 and 1912 on various occasions. It reminded its readers that whether or not the money was received illegally under Japanese law, it was certainly illegal under the British Prevention of Corruption Act, 1906.

Karl Richter was arrested in Germany for his theft of the incriminating papers, and sentenced to two years in prison. The head of the Siemens subsidiary in Japan, Hermann Kessler faced a public accusation in the German Reichstag by Karl Liebknecht, but was not charged.

== Japanese political fallout ==
Large-scale demonstrations erupted in Tokyo in early February 1914, which turned violent on 10 February and 14 February. The largest protest drew some 50,000 attendees. The navy, backed by the Prime Minister Yamamoto, had earlier demanded a huge increase of 70 million yen for its budget, but this was so large that it would reduce the scope for a business tax reduction that had previously been expected and lobbied for. Public opinion was outraged. Although Prime Minister Yamamoto was not directly implicated in the bribery, public dissatisfaction with him continued to grow, and he was challenged to explain the bribery allegations before the House of Peers. Minister of the Navy Saito Makoto offered a reduced budget request of 30 million yen as a compromise, but this failed to stem the scandal.

After both houses of the Diet refused to pass the 1914 Navy budget on 24 March 1914, and with the cabinet facing a vote of censure in the lower house, Yamamoto resigned the same day, bringing down his entire cabinet with him. Given that Yamamoto was also an officer of the Japanese Navy, a court martial demoted Yamamoto and Saito Makoto, both of whom had previously held the rank of Admiral. Subsequent courts martial sentenced several leading members of the navy procurement department to prison sentences, issued heavy fines to Vickers and Siemens, and banned both companies from future participation in contracts. Still, prosecutor-general Kiichirō Hiranuma declined to prosecute some of the navy officers alleged to be involved, perhaps due to fears of sullying the navy's reputation too much.

Yamamoto's cabinet was further damaged by influential politician Hara Takashi revoking his support. While Hara expected his Rikken Seiyūkai political party to fill the resulting power vacuum, Ōkuma Shigenobu became the new prime minister instead.

== See also ==
- Siemens Greek bribery scandal of 2008
