= SS Kokai Maru =

Japanese cargo ship sunk in the Second World War

History

Japan
- Name: Kokai Maru
- Owner: Simatani Kisen Kabushiki Kaisha
- Operator: 1941: Imperial Japanese Navy
- Port of registry: Kobe
- Builder: Hakodate Dock Company, Hakodate
- Completed: 1939
- Identification: call sign JOSJ
- Fate: Sunk by air attack, 21 February 1944

General characteristics
- Type: cargo ship
- Tonnage: 3,871 GRT, 2,286 NRT
- Length: 340.4 ft (103.8 m)
- Beam: 48.2 ft (14.7 m)
- Depth: 26.2 ft (8.0 m)
- Decks: 2
- Installed power: 232 NHP
- Propulsion: triple expansion engine driving steam compressor
- Sensors & processing systems: wireless direction finding, echo sounding device

Kokai Maru was a Japanese cargo steamship. She was built in Hokkaido in 1939, and sunk in the Pacific Ocean by United States Army Air Force aircraft in 1944.

== Building ==
The Hakodate Dock Company built Kokai Maru, completing her in 1939. Her registered length was 340.4 ft (103.8 m), her beam was 48.2 ft (14.7 m) and her depth was 26.2 ft (8.0 m). Her tonnages were 3,871 GRT and 2,286 NRT.

She had a single screw, driven by a three-cylinder triple expansion engine. Exhaust steam from her engine's low-pressure cylinder drove a compressor, which re-pressurised steam exhausted from the high-pressure cylinder before it entered the intermediate-pressure cylinder. Compressing the steam also increased its temperature, counter-acting steam's tendency to condense as it expands.

Kokai Maru's owner was Simatani Kisen Kabushiki Kaisha, who registered her at Kobe. Her wireless telegraph call sign was JOSJ.

== War service and loss ==
In 1941 the Imperial Japanese Navy requisitioned Kokai Maru. On 10 March 1942, during the Japanese invasion of Salamaua–Lae, US Navy SBD Dauntless aircraft from the carriers USS Lexington and Yorktown damaged her off Lae, New Guinea.

On 21 February 1944 Kokai Maru was part of a convoy off New Hanover Island. USAAF B-25 Mitchell aircraft bombed her, and she sank at position 02°16′S 150°12′E. Fifty people aboard the ship were killed.

== Bibliography ==
- Hardy, AC (1954) [1948]. Modern Marine Engineering. Vol. I (revised ed.). London: Caxton Publishing.
- Lloyd's Register of Shipping (PDF). Vol. II.–Steamers and Motorships of 300 tons gross and over. London: Lloyd's Register of Shipping. 1939 – via Southampton City Council.
