= USS Darter (SS-227) =

United States Navy Gato-class submarine

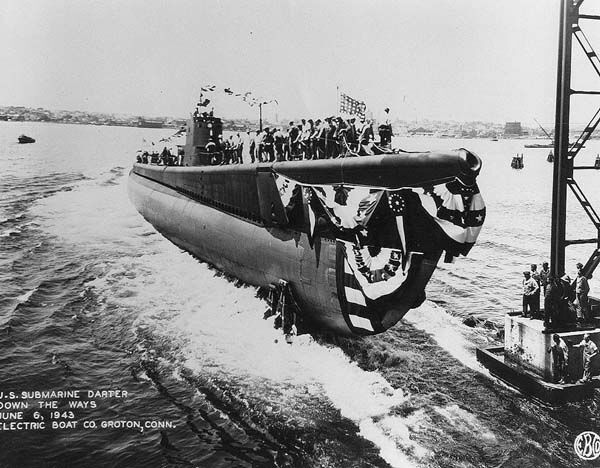
- Darter (SS-227), "Down the Ways", 6 June 1943

History

United States
- Name: USS Darter
- Builder: Electric Boat Company, Groton, Connecticut
- Laid down: 20 October 1942
- Launched: 6 June 1943
- Sponsored by: Mrs. E. B. Wheeler
- Commissioned: 7 September 1943
- Fate: Grounded in the Palawan Passage and scuttled on 24 October 1944

General characteristics
- Class & type: Gato-class diesel-electric submarine
- Displacement: 1,525 long tons (1,549 t) surfaced, 2,424 long tons (2,463 t) submerged
- Length: 311 ft 9 in (95.02 m)
- Beam: 27 ft 3 in (8.31 m)
- Draft: 17 ft (5.2 m) maximum
- Propulsion: 4 × General Motors Model 16-248 V16 Diesel engines driving electric generators; 2 × 126-cell Sargo batteries; 4 × high-speed General Electric electric motors with reduction gears; two propellers; 5,400 shp (4.0 MW) surfaced; 2,740 shp (2.0 MW) submerged
- Speed: 21 kn (24 mph; 39 km/h) surfaced, 9 kn (10 mph; 17 km/h) submerged
- Range: 11,000 nmi (13,000 mi; 20,000 km) surfaced @ 10 kn (12 mph; 19 km/h)
- Endurance: 48 hours @ 2 kn (2.3 mph; 3.7 km/h) submerged, 75 days on patrol
- Test depth: 300 ft (91 m)
- Complement: 6 officers, 54 enlisted
- Armament: 10 × 21-inch (533 mm) torpedo tubes; 6 forward, 4 aft; 24 torpedoes; 1 × 3-inch (76 mm) / 50 caliber deck gun; Bofors 40 mm and Oerlikon 20 mm cannon

USS Darter (SS-227), a Gato-class submarine, was the first boat of the United States Navy to be named for the darter.

== Construction and commissioning ==
Darter′s keel was laid down on 20 October 1942 by the Electric Boat Company of Groton, Connecticut. She was launched on 6 June 1943, sponsored by Mrs. E. B. Wheeler, wife of Edwin B. Wheeler, shipbuilding manager of Electric Boat, and commissioned on 7 September 1943.

== World War II ==
Darter put out from New London, Connecticut, on 31 October 1943 for Pearl Harbor, arriving on 26 November.

=== First patrol ===
On 21 December 1943, she cleared harbor on her first war patrol, bound for the heavily traveled shipping lanes south and west of Truk. This patrol was twice interrupted for repairs, at Pearl Harbor from 29 December 1943 – 3 January 1944, and at Tulagi and Milne Bay from 30 January–8 February. She performed a reconnaissance of Eniwetok on 12 January, and the next day scored a torpedo hit on a large ship, only to receive a severe depth charge attack from her target's escorts. She stood by on patrol during the carrier air strikes on Truk of 16–17 February, then fueled at Milne Bay on her way to refit at Brisbane from 29 February–17 March. She suffered her only casualty of the war during this refit when Motor Machinist's Mate, Second Class Robert Richard Gould, Jr. was electrocuted.

=== Second patrol ===
On her way to her second war patrol north of Western New Guinea and south of Davao, Darter topped off fuel at Milne Bay on 21–22 March 1944. On 30 March, she sank a ship, then patrolled off New Guinea during Allied landings on its coast. She put into Darwin to refuel on 29–30 April, then returned to her patrol area until 23 May, when she arrived at Manus Island.

=== Third patrol ===
Refitted, she put out for action waters once more on 21 June on her third war patrol off Halmahera and Mindanao. She sank the IJN minelayer Tsugaru off Morotai on 29 June 1944 and again endured a heavy depth charge barrage as a result of her attack.

=== Fourth patrol ===
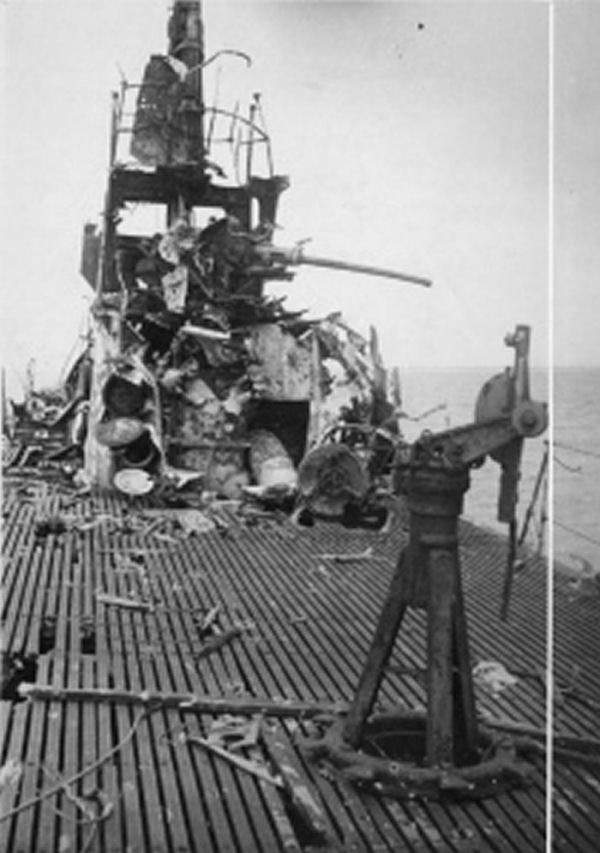
Destruction on the deck after she was grounded and destroyed by shellfire on Bombay Shoal off Palawan

Returning to Brisbane on 8 August 1944, Darter cleared on her fourth and last war patrol. She searched the Celebes Sea and South China Sea, returned to Darwin to fuel and make minor repairs on 10 September, and put back to the Celebes Sea. She pulled into Mios Woendi on 27 September for additional fuel and sailed on 1 October with Dace to patrol the South China Sea in coordination with the forthcoming invasion of Leyte. She attacked a tanker convoy on 12 October, and on 21 October, she headed with Dace for the Balabac Strait to watch for Japanese shipping moving to reinforce the Philippines or attack the landing forces.

In an outstanding performance of duty, which was to award both submarines the Navy Unit Commendation and Darter's commanding officer, David Hayward McClintock, the Navy Cross, Darter and Dace made contact with the Japanese Center Force approaching Palawan Passage on 23 October. Immediately, Darter flashed the contact report, one of the most important of the war, since the location of this Japanese task force had been unknown for some days. The two submarines closed the task force, and with attacks on the cruisers of Center Force, initiated the attacks in the Palawan Passage, the first action of the decisive Battle for Leyte Gulf. Darter sank the heavy cruiser Atago and seriously damaged the cruiser Takao. With Dace, she tracked the damaged cruiser through the tortuous channels of Palawan Passage until just after midnight of 24–25 October, when Darter grounded on Bombay Shoal 9.456°N 116.933°E.

As efforts to get the submarine off the shoal began, the Japanese destroyer Naganami closed, unsuccessfully tried to tow her off the reef or to destroy her, but then sailed on. With the tide receding, all Dace's and Darter's efforts to get her off failed. All confidential papers and equipment were destroyed, and the entire crew taken off to Dace. When the demolition charges planted in Darter failed to destroy her, Dace fired torpedoes, which exploded on the reef due to the shallow water. Dace did, however, score 21 hits with her 3 in (76 mm) gun. Rock was called in and fired 10 torpedoes at Darter with similar lack of success. Finally, Nautilus arrived on 31 October and scored 55 hits with her 6 in (150 mm) guns. Her report states, "It is doubtful that any equipment in DARTER at 1130 this date would be of any value to Japan – except as scrap. Estimated draft of DARTER – 4 feet." With the scuttling occurring late in the war, the Japanese made no further efforts to recover the wreck, and her hull remained remarkably intact as late as 1962.

Dace reached Fremantle safely with Darter's men on 6 November. To retain their high esprit de corps, the entire Darter crew was ordered to take over Menhaden, then being built at Manitowoc, Wisconsin.

== Postwar ==
In October 1951, a salvage party from the US Navy arrived at the wreck to dispose of the six torpedoes left on board in the forward torpedo room. Charges were placed around the torpedoes, and the resulting detonation blew off the entire bow. In 1998, her badly deteriorated remains could be seen protruding above the surface on the reef, but as of 2023, no evidence of the wreck was visible.

== Awards ==
In addition to the Navy Unit Commendation, Darter received four battle stars earned during her four war patrols, the last three of which were designated as "successful". She is credited with having sunk a total of 19429 tons of Japanese shipping.
