= Matsumoto Kazu =

Japanese admiral (1860–1940)

- 松本 和
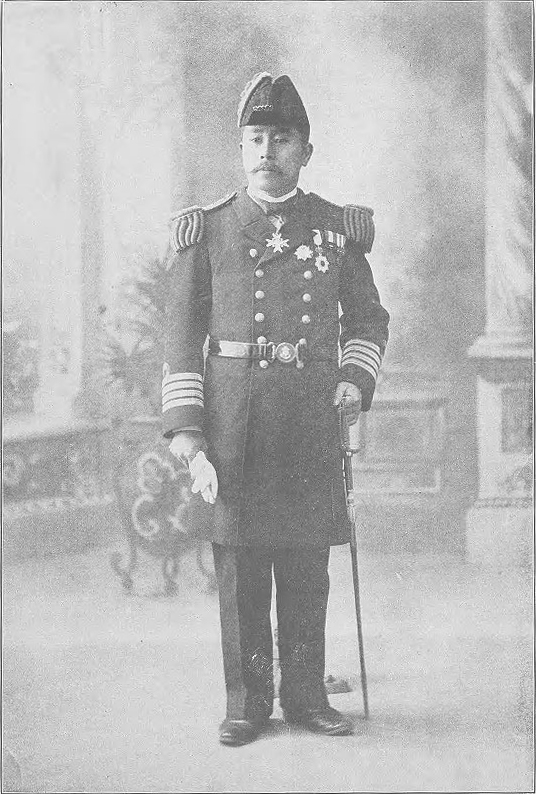
- Matsumoto as captain (1899-1905)
- Born: 15 March 1860; Edo, Japan
- Died: January 20, 1940 (aged 79)
- Military career
- Allegiance: Empire of Japan
- Branch: Imperial Japanese Navy
- Service years: 1880–1914
- Rank: Vice Admiral
- Commands: Yaeyama, Itsukushima, Fuji, Naval Hydrography Bureau, Naval Construction Bureau, Kure Naval District
- Conflicts: First Sino-Japanese War; Russo-Japanese War

Matsumoto Kazu (松本 和; 15 March 1860 – 20 January 1940) was a vice admiral in the Imperial Japanese Navy, noted for his role in the Siemens scandal.

== Biography ==
Matsumoto was born in Edo (now Tokyo) as the younger son of a direct retainer of the Tokugawa shogunate. He graduated in 1880 from the 7th class of the Imperial Japanese Naval Academy, ranked 19 out of 30 cadets. He served on a number of ships in the early Imperial Japanese Navy, including the corvettes Tsukuba, Settsu, Ryūjō, and Tsukushi. Promoted to lieutenant in 1886, he graduated from the first class of the Naval Staff College in 1888. He was the chief navigator on the cruiser Itsukushima in 1891–1892 on its year-long voyage to France.

Matsumoto then served in various postings within the Imperial Japanese Navy General Staff after his return to Japan in May 1892, and on the staff of the Readiness Fleet. During the First Sino-Japanese War he was in charge of coordinating transportation for Imperial Japanese Army units and supplies to the Asian continent, winning much praise for his abilities. Although not in a combat command, he was awarded the Order of the Golden Kite, 4th class.

In June 1899, Matsumoto received his first command, that of the Yaeyama. He was promoted to captain three months later. He became commanding officer of Itsukushima in October 1903, and was given command of the battleship Fuji in September 1903.

During the Russo-Japanese War, Matsumoto participated at the Battle of Port Arthur and the Battle of the Yellow Sea. He was captain during the Battle of Tsushima, during which Fuji sank the Russian battleship Borodino. After the end of the war, Matsumoto was promoted to rear admiral and became commandant of Yokosuka Naval Arsenal in November 1906 and director of Naval Construction Bureau from October 1908. He was promoted to vice admiral in December 1909 and commander of Kure Naval District from December 1913. Matsumoto was widely regarded as the future Naval Minister. However, in the Siemens scandal, he was implicated of taking a bribe for facilitating the procurement of the Kongō. He was found guilty at a court-martial in May 1914, stripped of his rank and honors, fined 409,800 Yen and sentenced to three years in prison. After his release, he lived the rest of his life in obscurity.

== Sources ==
- Dupuy, Trevor N. (1992). Encyclopedia of Military Biography. I B Tauris & Co Ltd. ISBN 1-85043-569-3.
- Schencking, J. Charles (2005). Making Waves: Politics, Propaganda, And The Emergence Of The Imperial Japanese Navy, 1868–1922. Stanford University Press. ISBN 0-8047-4977-9.
- Kowner, Rotem (2006). Historical Dictionary of the Russo-Japanese War. Scarecrow. ISBN 0-8108-4927-5.

Military offices
Preceded by Katō Tomosaburō	Commander-in-chief of Kure Naval District; 1 December 1913 - 25 March 1914	Succeeded by Yoshimatsu Motarō
