= Japanese submarine I-152 =

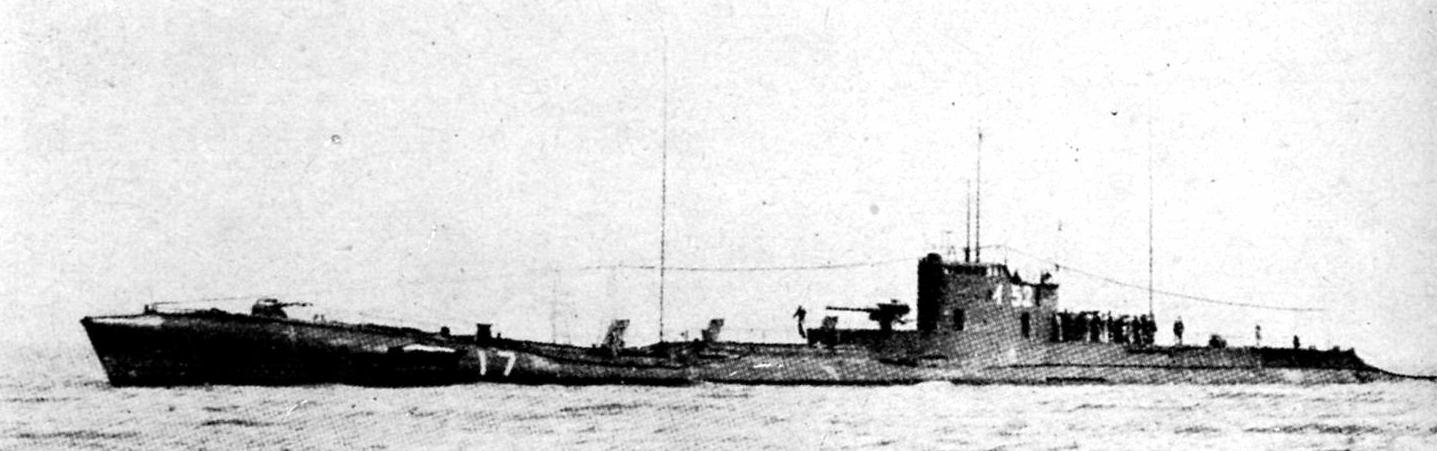
- I-52 in 1930.

History

Japan
- Name: Submarine No. 51
- Ordered: 1919 fiscal year
- Builder: Kure Naval Arsenal, Kure, Japan
- Laid down: 14 February 1922 or 2 April 1922 (see text)
- Launched: 12 June 1923
- Renamed: I-52 on 1 November 1924
- Completed: 20 May 1925
- Commissioned: 20 May 1925
- Renamed: I-152 on 20 May 1942
- Decommissioned: 14 July 1942
- Stricken: 1 August 1942
- Renamed: Haikan No. 14 on 1 August 1942
- Fate: Hulked 1 August 1942; Scrapped 1946-1948

General characteristics
- Class & type: Kaidai-class submarine (Type II)
- Displacement: 1,500 long tons (1,524 t) surfaced; 2,500 long tons (2,540 t) submerged
- Length: 100.85 m (330 ft 10 in)
- Beam: 7.64 m (25 ft 1 in)
- Draught: 5.14 m (16 ft 10 in)
- Propulsion: 2 × Sulzer diesel engines, 6,800 hp (5.1 MW); 2 x Electric motors, 2,000 hp (1.5 MW)
- Speed: 21.5 knots (39.8 km/h; 24.7 mph) (surfaced); 7.7 kn (14.3 km/h; 8.9 mph) (submerged)
- Range: 10,000 nmi (19,000 km) @ 10 kn (19 km/h; 12 mph) (surfaced); 100 nmi (190 km) @ 4 kn (7.4 km/h; 4.6 mph) (submerged)
- Test depth: 45.7 m (150 ft)
- Complement: 58 officers and men
- Armament: 6 × 533 mm (21 in) forward torpedo tubes; 2 × 533 mm (21 in) aft torpedo tubes; 1 x 12 cm/45 10th Year Type naval gun 16 × naval mines

I-52 (伊号第五十二潜水艦, I-go dai-go-jyuni sensuikan), later I-152 (伊号第百五十二潜水艦, I-go dai-hyaku-go-jyuni sensuikan), was the second prototype of the Kaidai-class submarine of the Imperial Japanese Navy. Commissioned in 1925, she became a training ship in 1935 and was decommissioned in 1942 during the early months of the Pacific campaign of World War II. She subsequently served as the stationary training hulk Haikan No. 14 and was scrapped after the war.

== Background ==
Following World War I, the Imperial Japanese Navy General Staff began to re-consider submarine warfare as an element of fleet strategy. Before the war, the Imperial Japanese Navy regarded submarines as useful only for short-range coastal point defense. However, based on the success of the Imperial German Navy in the deployment of long-range cruiser submarines for commerce raiding Japanese strategists came to realize possibilities for using the weapon for long range reconnaissance, and in a war of attrition against an enemy fleet approaching Japan. Although a large, long-range Japanese submarine had already been authorized in fiscal 1918 under the Eight-six fleet program as Project S22 (later designated I-51), a second prototype with a different design (the future I-52) was authorized in fiscal year 1919.

== Design ==
The first Kaidai prototype, Project S22, was based on the latest Royal Navy design, the British K class submarine; it became the Kaidai I type submarine I-51. The second Kaidai prototype, the Kaidai II type, was based on the German Type U 139 submarine. This second prototype was designated Project S25.

With improved Sulzer diesel engines, I-52 had a single hull and two engines, rather than the double-hull, four-engine design of I-51. The greater power and more streamlined shape gave a slightly higher surface speed than that of I-51, or even the Imperial German Navy submarine U-135, but with reduced range. I-52 had a design speed of 22 knots (41 km/h; 25 mph) on the surface and 10 knots (19 km/h; 12 mph) submerged, but as completed, achieved only 19.5 knots (36.1 km/h; 22.4 mph) on the surface. Her unrefueled range on the surface was 10,000 nautical miles (19,000 km; 12,000 mi), only half that of I-51.

The Japanese did not regard I-52 as a completely successful design despite the various technical achievements her design and construction represented and her superior performance to that of I-51. They planned several more submarines of the same Kaidai II design, but cancelled all of them before formally signing contracts for their construction after the arrival of seven Imperial German Navy U-boats Japan received as war reparations at the end of World War I prompted a review of Japanese submarine design concepts. I-52 thus was the only Kaidai II-type submarine constructed.

== Construction and commissioning ==
Project S25 was laid down as Submarine No.51 (第五十一号潜水艦, Dai-go-jyu-ichi-go sensuikan) at the Kure Naval Arsenal in Kure, Japan, on either 14 February or 2 April 1922, according to different sources, and she was launched on 12 June 1923. Renumbered I-52 伊号第五十二潜水艦 (I-go dai-go-jyuni sensuikan) on 1 November 1924, she was completed and commissioned on 20 May 1925.

== Operational history ==
=== Pre-World War II ===
On the day of her commissioning, I-52 was attached to the Kure Naval District. On 1 December 1925, she was assigned to Submarine Division 17 in Submarine Squadron 2 in the 2nd Fleet, a component of the Combined Fleet. On 25 October 1926, she was in Hiroshima Bay when the Hakata Bay Railway Company train ferry Fukuoka Maru accidentally rammed her in her port side, damaging her. She participated in the Grand Naval Maneuvers ("Special Great Maneuvers") of August to October 1927.

Submarine Division 17 was reassigned to the Kure Naval District on 10 December 1928, and while assigned to the district had two stints in the Kure Defense Squadron, from 30 November 1929 to 1 December 1930 and from 1 October 1932 to 1 January 1933. Unsuccessful in fleet service due to problems with her diesel engines, I-52 never returned to the fleet after Submarine Division 17′s reassignment to the Kure Naval District in 1928. Instead, she was retained as part of Submarine Division 17 at the Kure Naval Arsenal for crew training. Submarine Division 17 was deactivated on 15 November 1935, and I-52 was assigned directly to the Kure Naval District that day.

Sources are unclear on I-52′s status in the latter half of the 1930s and at the beginning of the 1940s. She may have become a stationary training ship at the Maizuru Naval Engineering School as early as mid-1935, or her assignment to the school may not have occurred until 15 December 1938. She also was reassigned to the Maizuru Naval District for this duty, but sources disagree on whether this reassignment took place on 15 December 1938 or 1 February 1939. She was reattached to the Kure Naval District either on 31 July 1941 or 8 December 1941.

=== World War II ===
On 8 December 1941 — the day the Pacific campaign of World War II began in East Asia, which was 7 December 1941 on the other side of the International Date Line in Hawaii, where Japan began the war in the Pacific with its attack on Pearl Harbor — I-52 was assigned to the Kure Guard Force in the Kure Naval District for duty as a training ship in the Seto Inland Sea, based at Kure. Sometime after 10 April 1942, she also took part in testing different submarine garbage disposal units. She was renumbered I-152 (伊号第百五十二潜水艦, I-go dai-hyaku-go-jyuni sensuikan) on 20 May 1942.

I-152 was placed in reserve on 14 July 1942 and removed from the navy list on 1 August 1942. Renamed Haikan No. 14 ("Hulk No. 14"), she became a stationary training hulk at the submarine school at Kure. She later was transferred to the Hirao branch of the Ōtake Submarine School in Yamaguchi Prefecture. When hostilities with the Allies of World War II ended on 15 August 1945, she was laid up at Hirao. Haikan No. 14 was scrapped at the former Kure Naval Arsenal between 1946 and 1948.
