= Hermann Kessler =

Liechtensteiner-German engineer and entrepreneur (1933–2016)

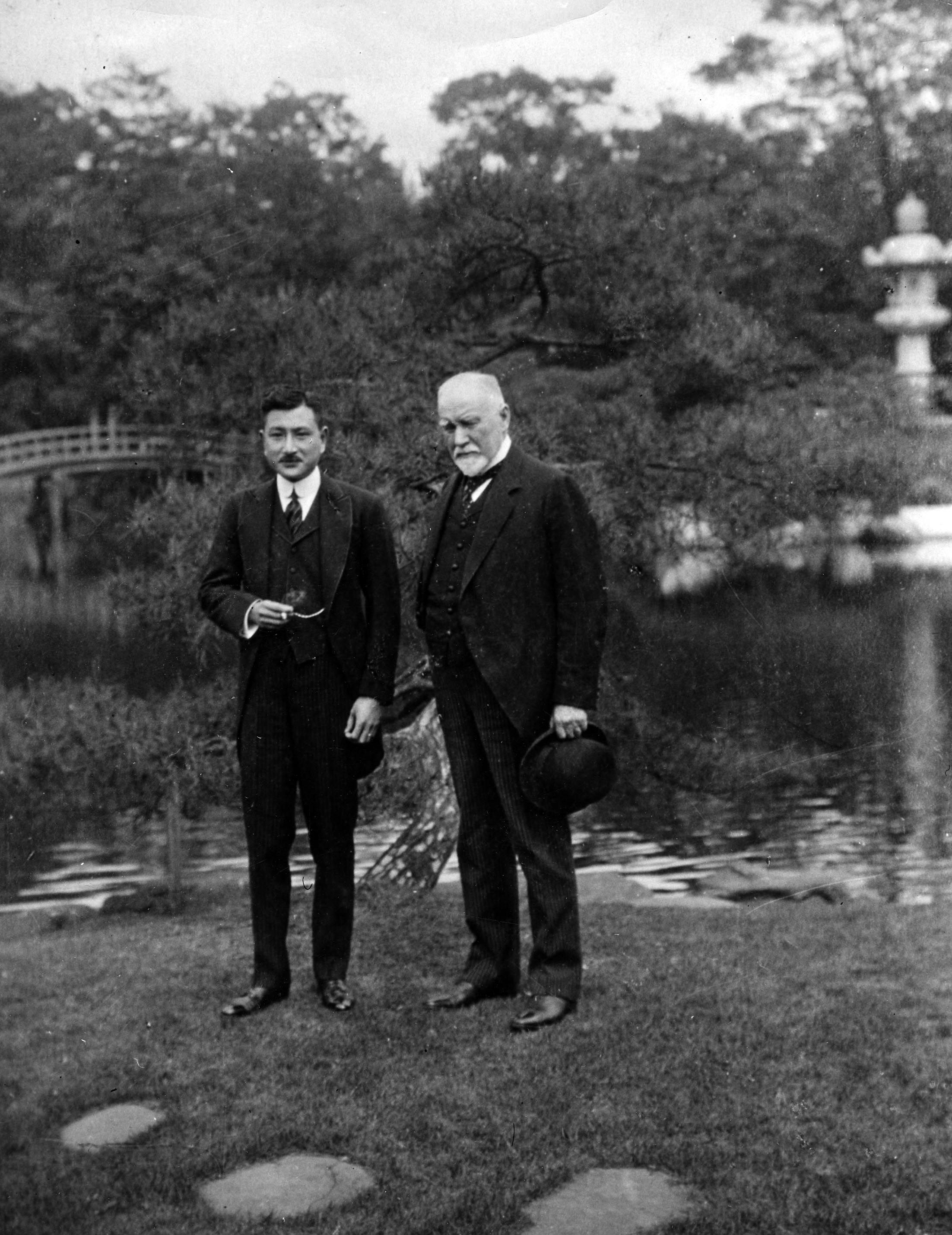
- Kessler (right) with Toranosuke Furukawa, 1921
- Born: 12 April 1870; Vaduz, Liechtenstein
- Died: 23 November 1927 (aged 67); Berlin, Germany
- Organization: Siemens & Halske
- Spouse: Ingeborg Huber (died 1893) Renate Waldhuber
- Children: 6
- Parent(s): Markus Kessler; Anna Amalie Menzingeri

Hermann Kessler (/kˈɛslər/ German: [hˈɜːmən kˈɛslɚ]; 12 April 1860 – 23 November 1927) was a Liechtensteiner-German engineer and entrepreneur.

== Early life ==
Kessler was born on 12 April 1860 in Vaduz as one of the six children of the son of Landtag of Liechtenstein member and district judge Markus Kessler and Anna Amalie Menzinger.

He attended high school in Feldkirch and then studied natural sciences, mechanical engineering and electrical engineering in Zurich and Stuttgart.

== Career ==
After completing his studies, he worked at Fein in Stuttgart and from 1883 he worked at Siemens & Halske in Berlin. The company sent Kessler to Tokyo in 1887 as an electrical engineer, there he built up Siemens' East Asia and Japanese business and as general representative of the subsidiary "Siemens & Halske, Japan Agency" which was founded in 1893. This was involved in building the first hydroelectric power plant in Japan, Keage power plant.

He returned to Germany in 1908, where he continued to manage the company's business in Japan from Berlin. In this position he was complicate in the Siemens scandal, where it was revealed that the company has previously given a 1000 (~142,000 today) pound sterling bribe to the Imperial Japanese Navy in return for a wireless contract. As a result, Kessler faced a public accusation from the German Reichstag by Karl Liebknecht, but was not charged. His influence over Japanese business waned after Japan's entry into World War I against Germany.

Kessler died on 23 November 1927, aged 67 years old.

== Personal life ==
Kessler married Emma Holzboog (18 March 18 1860 – 30 May 1893) and then Hedwig Henle (27 July 1866 – 5 November 1934). He had six children.

After his return to Germany in 1908, Kessler visited his home-country of Liechtenstein every year. In 1906 he had a holiday home built in the country. He frequently commented on politics within the country and acted as a charitable donor in Liechtenstein.
