= Japanese minesweeper Tama Maru No. 2 =

Whaling ship converted and used by the Japanese Navy during World War II

History

Empire of Japan
- Name: Tama Maru No. 2
- Owner: Taiyo Hogei Kabushiki Kaisha (1936-1941); Imperial Japanese Navy (1941-1944)
- Builder: Mitsubishi Jukogyo Kabushiki Kaisha
- Launched: 1936
- Home port: Kobe
- Identification: 42340
- Fate: Sunk as a result of damage by US aircraft on 24 December 1942
- Notes: Call sign: JGIL

General characteristics
- Class & type: Tama Maru-class
- Tonnage: 515 GRT 254 NRT
- Length: 119.7 feet (36.5 m)
- Beam: 24.1 feet (7.3 m)
- Draught: 13.7 feet (4.2 m)
- Propulsion: Triple expansion engines (76 NHP)

Tama Maru No. 2 (Japanese: 第二玉丸) was a 264 gross register tons (GRT) whaler built by Mitsubishi Jukogyo Kabushiki Kaisha, Kobe for Taiyo Hogei Kabushiki Kaisha in 1936. She was one of 19 Type F ships built. She was requisitioned in 1941 by the Imperial Japanese Navy during World War II and converted into a minesweeper. On 24 December 1942, during the invasion of Lae-Salamaua, Tama Maru No. 2 was attacked and sunk by Douglas SBD Dauntless dive bombers from the United States Navy aircraft carriers USS Lexington and USS Yorktown off Lae, New Guinea.
