= Japanese seaplane tender Kiyokawa Maru =

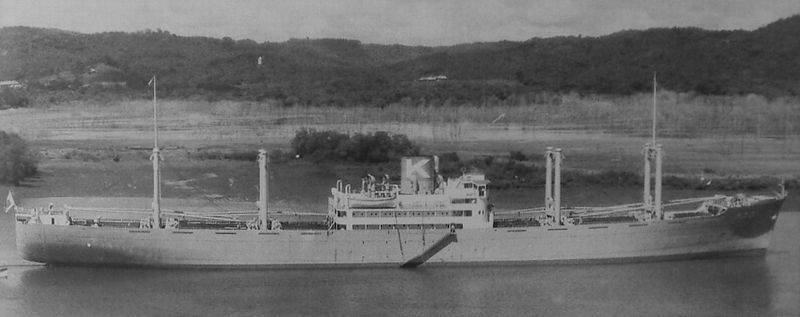
- Kiyokawa Maru at the Panama Canal on 29 September 1937

History

Japan
- Name: Kiyokawa Maru
- Builder: Kawasaki, Kōbe Shipyard
- Laid down: October 21, 1936
- Launched: February 16, 1937
- Acquired: September 28, 1941
- Commissioned: October 5, 1941
- Out of service: July 20, 1945
- Stricken: August 10, 1946
- Fate: Scrapped 1969

General characteristics
- Class & type: Kamikawa Maru-class seaplane tender
- Displacement: 6,863 tons standard
- Length: 479 feet
- Beam: 62 feet
- Draft: 30 feet td>
- Installed power: 7,600 shp
- Propulsion: 1 Kawasaki-M.A.N. diesel, 1 shaft
- Speed: 19 knots
- Armament: 2 x 5.9-inch, 2 x Type 96 25 mm (0.98 in) AA, 2 x 13.2 mm (0.52 in) MG
- Aircraft carried: 12 seaplanes (24 stored)
- Aviation facilities: Two catapults, cranes

Kiyokawa Maru (聖川丸) was a Kamikawa Maru-class seaplane tender of the Imperial Japanese Navy (IJN).

== History ==
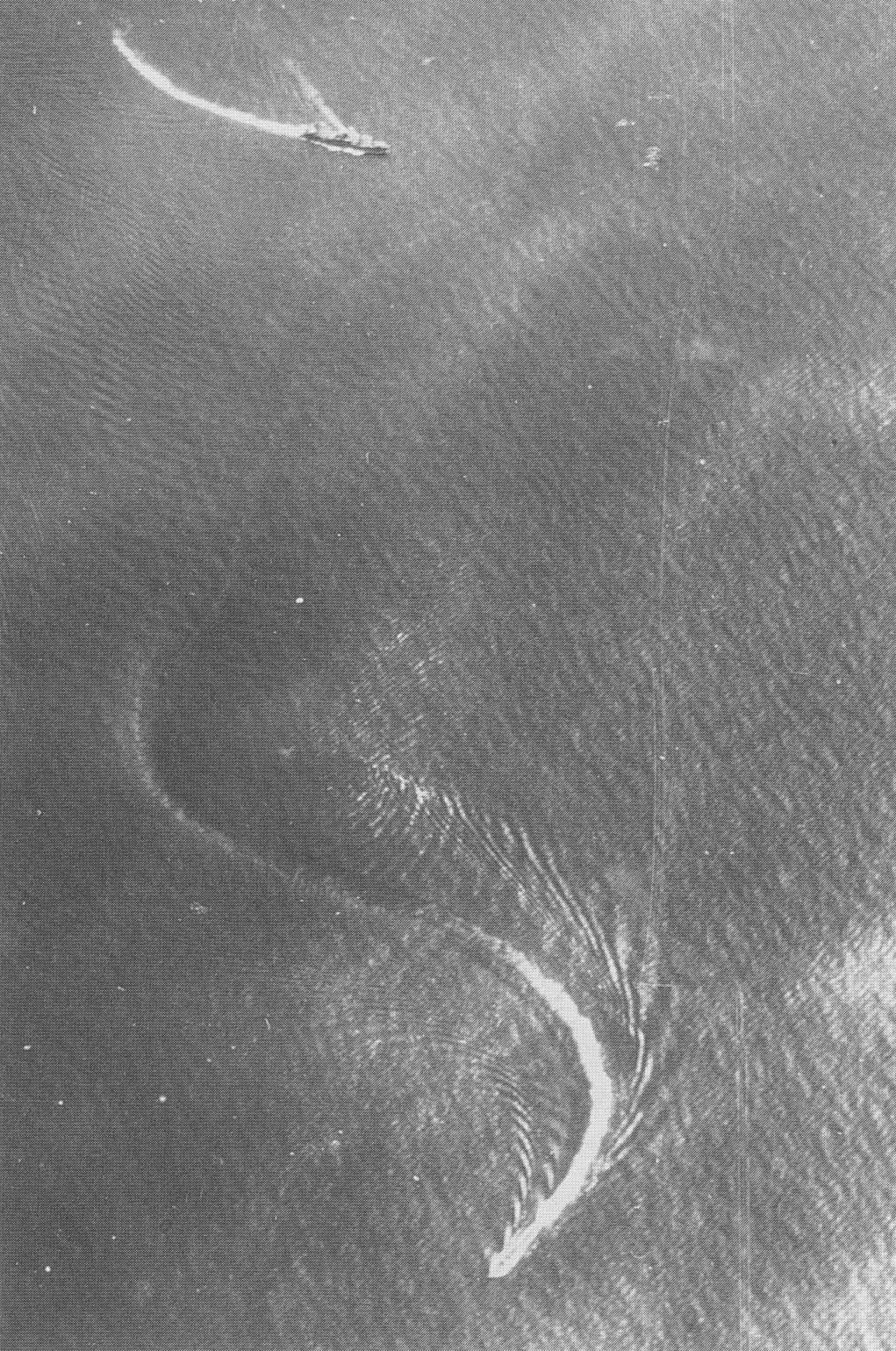
Kiyokawa Maru (top) and destroyer Mochizuki (bottom) maneuver under aerial attack by US Navy aircraft from the carrier Yorktown during the Invasion of Lae-Salamaua on March 10, 1942.

The ship was built at Kawasaki's Kōbe Shipyard and launched on 13 December 1936 as a merchant vessel for the Kawasaki Kisen K. K. Line. Kyokawa Maru was involved in a collision with the small train ferry Uko Maru No. 1 on 19 August 1937 in the Seto Inland Sea, southwest of Nakanose.

Requisitioned by the IJN on 28 September 1941 and was refitted as a seaplane tender. The ship subsequently saw service in the Pacific Campaign of World War II. Kiyokawa Maru was attacked by aircraft from Task Force 38 on 20 July 1945. Hit by bombs and heavily damaged she was beached off Shida beach north of Kaminoseki, Yamaguchi to avoid sinking.

On 22 November 1945 during heavy weather, Kiyokawa Maru sank. Raised in December 1948, later repaired and put in civilian passenger service. Scrapped 1969.
