= Japanese minesweeper Tama Maru No. 7 =

- Japanese minesweeper Tama Maru No. 7

History

Empire of Japan
- Name: Tama Maru No. 7
- Builder: Fujinagata Zosensho
- Laid down: 1 March 1936
- Launched: 22 July 1936
- Sponsored by: Taiyo Hogei
- Completed: 1 September 1936
- Acquired: Requisitioned by Imperial Japanese Navy, 11 April 1941
- Decommissioned: 31 March 1944
- Reclassified: Reclassified as a submarine chaser, 10 May 1944
- Stricken: 10 August 1944
- Identification: 42330
- Fate: Sunk 18 June 1944
- Notes: Call sign: JIVK

General characteristics
- Class & type: Tama Maru-class
- Tonnage: 275 GRT
- Length: 38.4 m (126 ft 0 in) overall
- Beam: 7.3 m (23 ft 11 in)
- Draught: 4.1 m (13 ft 5 in)

Tama Maru No. 7 (Japanese: 第七玉丸 ) was an auxiliary minesweeper of the Imperial Japanese Navy during World War II. She was later reclassified as a submarine chaser.

== History ==
Tama Maru No. 7 was laid down on 1 March 1936 at the shipyard of Fujinagata Zosensho at the behest of shipping company, Taiyo Hogei. She was launched on 22 July 1936 and completed 1 September 1936. On 11 April 1941, she was requisitioned by the Imperial Japanese Navy and converted to an auxiliary minesweeper under Reserve Lieutenant (Junior Grade) Fujita Yoshinao (藤田義直). Fujita served until 20 April 1943 when he was replaced by Reserve Lieutenant Koga Shunji (古賀春次). On 10 May 1944, she was reclassified as a submarine chaser. She was sunk on 18 June 1944 and struck from the Navy list on 10 August 1944.
