= Rapid Naval Armaments Supplement Programme =

Armament expansion plan of the Imperial Japanese Navy (IJN) in 1941

The Rapid Naval Armaments Supplement Programme (出師準備第一着作業建艦計画, Suishi-Junbi Dai-Ichi Chakusagyō Kenkan Keikaku; Deployment Preparations, 1st Naval Armaments Supplement Programm), or Circle Rapid Plan (マル急計画, Maru Kyū Keikaku) was one of the armaments expansion plan of the Imperial Japanese Navy (IJN).

== Background ==
In August 1941, the IJN started building warships for war. It extended to 293 vessels, 300,000 tons.

== Table of vessels ==
Category	Class	Vessel number(s)	Completed	Converted	Cancelled
Heavy cruiser	Ibuki	#300 - 301		#300 was converted to aircraft carrier	#301
Aircraft carrier	Unryū	#302	Unryū (#302)		
Seaplane tender	Akitsushima	#303			#303
Fleet oiler	Kazahaya	#304 - 307	Kazahaya (#304)	#306 was converted to the Hayasui class	#305, 307
Fleet oiler	Hayasui		Hayasui (#306)		
Escort ship Type-A	Etorofu	#310 - 339	Etorofu (#310), Matsuwa (#311), Sado (#312), Oki (#313), Mutsure (#314), Iki (#315), Tsushima (#316), Wakamiya (#317), Hirado (#318), Fukae (#319), Amakusa (#321), Manju (#323), Kanju (#325), Kasado (#330)	#320, #322, #324, #326 - 329 and #331 - 339 were converted to the Mikura class	
Escort ship Type-B	Mikura		Mikura (#320), Miyake (#322), Awaji (#324), Nōmi (#326), Kurahashi (#327), Chiburi (#329), Yashiro (#331), Kusagaki (#334)	#328, #333 and #339 were converted to the Hiburi class #332 and #335 - 338 were converted to the Ukuru class	
Escort ship Type-B	Hiburi		Hiburi (#328), Daitō (#333), Shōnan (#339)		
Escort ship Type-B	Ukuru		Ukuru (#332), Okinawa (#335), Amami (#336), Aguni (#337), Shinnan (#338)		
Destroyer Type-A	Yūgumo	#340 - 355	Hayanami (#340), Hamanami (#341), Okinami (#342), Kishinami (#343), Asashimo (#344), Hayashimo (#345), Akishimo (#346), Kiyoshimo (#347)		#348 - 355
Destroyer Type-B	Akizuki	#360 - 369	Shimotsuki (#360), Fuyutsuki (#361), Harutsuki (#362), Yoizuki (#363), Natsuzuki (#364), Hanazuki (#366)		#367 - 369
Cruiser submarine Type-B	I-40	#370 - 375	I-40 (#370) to I-45 (#375)		
Cruiser submarine Type-C	I-16	#376 - 378	I-46 (#376) to I-48 (#378)		
Cruiser submarine Type-C	S49B	#379 - 381			#379 - 381
Medium-sized submarine	Ro-35	#385 - 396	Ro-44 (#385) to Ro-50 (#391), Ro-55 (#396)		#392 - 395
Medium-sized submarine	Ro-100	#400 - 408	Ro-109 (#400) to Ro-117 (#408),		
Minesweeper	No.19	#410 - 437	No.25 (#410) to No.30 (#415), No.33 (#418), No.34 (#419), No.38 (#423), No.39 (#424), No.41 (#426)		#416 - 417, #420 - 422, #425, #427 - 437
Subchaser	No.13	#440 - 459	No.40 (#440) to No.58 (#458)		#459
Minelayer	Ajiro	#460 - 473	Ajiro (#460)		#461 - 473
Auxiliary minesweeper	Aux. No.1	#480 - 495	Aux. No.7 (#480) to Aux. No.22 (#495)		
Auxiliary subchaser	Aux. No.1	#500 - 599	Aux. No.1 (#500) to Aux. No.100 (#599)		
Patrol torpedo boat	No.10	#600	No.10 (#600)		
Patrol torpedo boat	No.11	#601 - 617	No.11 (#601) to No.16 (#606)		#607 - 617

== See also ==
- 1st Naval Armaments Supplement Programme (Maru 1 Keikaku, 1931)
- 2nd Naval Armaments Supplement Programme (Maru 2 Keikaku, 1934)
- 3rd Naval Armaments Supplement Programme (Maru 3 Keikaku, 1937)
- 4th Naval Armaments Supplement Programme (Maru 4 Keikaku, 1939)
- Temporal Naval Armaments Supplement Programme (Maru Rin Keikaku, 1940)
- Additional Naval Armaments Supplement Programme (Maru Tui Keikaku, 1941)
- 5th Naval Armaments Supplement Programme (Maru 5 Keikaku, 1941)
- 6th Naval Armaments Supplement Programme (Maru 6 Keikaku, 1942)
- Modified 5th Naval Armaments Supplement Programme (Kai-Maru 5 Keikaku, 1942)
- Wartime Naval Armaments Supplement Programme (Maru Sen Keikaku, 1944)
