= Etorofu-class escort ship =

Japanese ship class

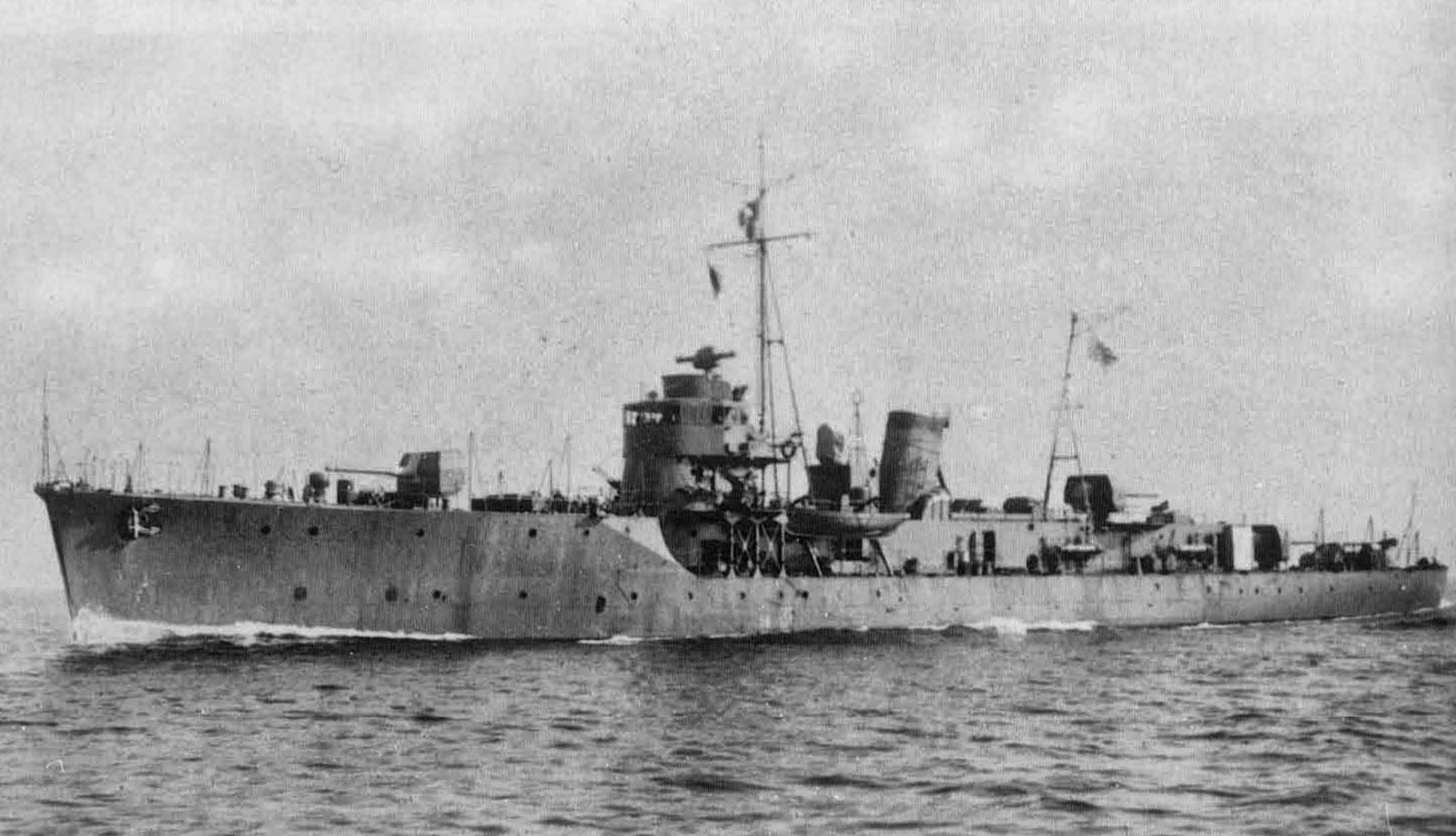
- Etorofu in 1943

Class overview
- Builders: Hitachi Zosen (4); Mitsui, Tama Shipyards (4); Nihon Kōkan (2); Uraga Dock Company (4)
- Operators: Imperial Japanese Navy; Republic of China Navy; People's Liberation Army Navy
- Preceded by: Shimushu class
- Succeeded by: Mikura class
- Built: 1942–1944
- Completed: 14
- Lost: 8

General characteristics
- Type: Escort vessel
- Displacement: 870 long tons (884 t)
- Length: 77.7 m (255 ft)
- Beam: 9.1 m (29 ft 10 in)
- Draught: 3.05 m (10 ft)
- Speed: 19.7 knots (22.7 mph; 36.5 km/h)
- Complement: 150
- Armament: 3 × 120 mm (4.7 in)/45cal DP guns; 4 × Type 96 25 mm (0.98 in) AA guns, later up to 15; 6 × depth charge throwers; 36 × depth charges initially, but later up to 60; 1 × 81 mm (3.2 in) mortar

The Etorofu-class escort ships (択捉型海防艦, Etorofu-gata kaibōkan) were a group of fourteen kaibōkan escort vessels built for the Imperial Japanese Navy during World War II. Eight of the fourteen ships were sunk during the war. The class was also referred to by internal Japanese documents as the "Modified A-class" coastal defense vessel (甲型海防艦, Kō-gata kaibōkan).

== Background ==
The Shimushu-class kaibōkan, as with the Chidori-class torpedo boat, was a consequence of the 1930 London Naval Treaty, which placed limitations on the total destroyer tonnage the Imperial Japanese Navy was permitted. One way in which the treaty could be circumvented was to use a loophole in the treaty which permitted ships of between 600 and 2,000 tons, with no more than four guns over 76 mm (3 in), no torpedoes, and with a maximum speed of no more than 20 knots (37 km/h; 23 mph). A new class of vessel was designed to use this loophole, and was given the obsolete designation of kaibōkan (Kai = sea, ocean, Bo = defence, Kan = ship), which had previously been used to designate obsolete battleships which had been reassigned to coastal defense duties. Immediately before the start of then Pacific War, the Imperial Japanese Navy suddenly decided to give more priority to convoy escorts, possibly in light of the ongoing successes of German U-boats against British shipping in the Atlantic. As the Shimushu class was not suited for mass-production and took too long to build, the 1941 Rapid Naval Armaments Supplement Programme authorized thirty modified versions of the Shimushu class, which were designated the Etorofu class. However, sixteen of the projected thirty ships were subsequently re-ordered to the subsequent Mikura, Hiburi or Ukura designs.

Production began between February 1942 and August 1943. Despite simplification, the design was still too complex for mass production and one of the ships was not completed until early 1944.

== Description ==
The Etorofu class was almost identical to the Shimushu class but with a simplified bow, stern and bridge structure to facilitate production. The ships measured 77.72 meters (255 ft 0 in) overall, with a beam of 9.1 meters (29 ft 10 in) and a draft of 3.05 meters (10 ft 0 in). They displaced 880 metric tons (870 long tons) at standard load and 1,040 metric tons (1,020 long tons) at deep load. The ships had two diesel engines, each driving one propeller shaft, which were rated at a total of 4,200 brake horsepower (3,100 kW) for a speed of 19.7 knots (36.5 km/h; 22.7 mph). The ships had a range of 8,000 nautical miles (15,000 km; 9,200 mi) at a speed of 16 knots (30 km/h; 18 mph).

As with the Shimushu class the main battery of the Etorofu class consisted of three Type 3 120-millimeter (4.7 in) guns in single mounts, one superfiring pair aft and one mount forward of the superstructure. Anti-aircraft protection was by four Type 96 25-millimeter (1.0 in) anti-aircraft guns in two twin-gun mounts abreast the bridge. However, for a ship supposedly designed for convoy escort, only one Model 94 depth charge launcher was installed on the quarterdeck along with a Model 3 loading frame. The number of depth charges was initially 36, but this was increased to 60 while the ships were still in production, which necessitated the deletion of the two paravanes initially in the design for minesweeping. The ships were also equipped with a Model 93 sonar and a Type 93 hydrophone.

During the Pacific War, the number of Type 96 anti-aircraft gun was increased to five triple-mounts and a varying number of single-mounts, up to 15 in total by August 1943. A Type 22 and Type 13 radar were also installed. A Type 97 81-millimeter (3.2 in) trench mortar was also installed front of the bridge

== Operational service ==
The Etorofu class proved to be an inadequate design by the time the final units entered service in 1944. Their speed was slower than most submarines, and with only one depth charge projector, their combat capability against the increasingly effective United States Navy submarine forces was ineffective. The Etorofu-class vessels were mostly deployed to the South China Sea or East China Sea as convoy escorts, but few recorded any attacks against Allied submarines. Conversely, six of the 14 ships in the class were sunk by American submarines. Of the six survivors, three were used as repatriation ships after the war, and were subsequently given as prize of war to Allied navies.

== Ships in class ==
Thirty ships (numbered #310 to #339) were included in the Rapid Naval Armaments Supplement Programme in 1941. These are listed below with the shipyard to which each was allocated:

Number	Name	Builder
#310	Etorofu	Hitachi-Sakurajima Shipyards
#311	Matsuwa	Mitsui-Tamano Shipyards
#312	Sado	NKK-Tsurumi Shipyards
#313	Oki	Uraga Dock Company
#314	Matsure	Hitachi-Sakurajima Shipyards
#315	Iki	Mitsui-Tamano Shipyards
#316	Tsushima	NKK-Tsurumi Shipyards
#317	Wakamiya	Mitsui-Tamano Shipyards
#318	Hirado	Hitachi-Sakurajima Shipyards
#319	Fukae	Uraga Dock Company
#320	Mikura	NKK-Tsurumi Shipyards
#321	Amakusa	Hitachi-Sakurajima Shipyards
#322	Miyake	NKK-Tsurumi Shipyards
#323	Manju	Mitsui-Tamano Shipyards
#324	Awaji	Hitachi-Sakurajima Shipyards

Number	Name	Builder
#325	Kanju	Uraga Dock Company
#326	Nōmi	Hitachi-Sakurajima Shipyards
#327	Kurahashi	NKK-Tsurumi Shipyards
#328	Hiburi	Hitachi-Sakurajima Shipyards
#329	Chiburi	NKK-Tsurumi Shipyards
#330	Kasado	Uraga Dock Company
#331	Yashiro	Hitachi-Sakurajima Shipyards
#332	Ukuru	NKK-Tsurumi Shipyards
#333	Daitō	Hitachi-Sakurajima Shipyards
#334	Kusagaki	NKK-Tsurumi Shipyards
#335	Okinawa	NKK-Tsurumi Shipyards
#336	Amami	NKK-Tsurumi Shipyards
#337	Aguni	NKK-Tsurumi Shipyards
#338	Shinnan	Uraga Dock Company
#339	Shōnan	Hitachi-Sakurajima Shipyards

While fourteen of the above ships were completed to the Etorofu design, eight ships - Mikura (#320), Miyake (#322), Awaji (#324), Nōmi (#326), Kurahashi (#327), Chiburi (#329), Yashiro (#331) and Kusagaki (#334) - were altered to be built to the Mikura design; three ships - Hiburi (#328), Daitō (#333) and Shōnan (#339) - were altered to be built to the Hiburi design; and five ships - Ukuru (#332), Okinawa (#335), Amami (#336), Aguni (#337) and Shinnan (#338) - were altered to be built to the 'Ukuru design. The fourteen completed to the (original) Etorofu design were as follows:

Kanji	Name	Builder	Laid down	Launched	Completed	Fate
択捉	Etorofu	Hitachi-Sakurajima Shipyards	23 February 1942	29 January 1943	15 May 1943	Ceded to the United States, 1946. Scrapped 1947
松輪	Matsuwa	Mitsui-Tamano Shipyards	20 April 1942	13 November 1942	23 March 1943	Sunk by USS Harder on 22 August 1944, Hidai Bay, Philippines [14-15N, 120-25E]
佐渡	Sado	NKK-Tsurumi Shipyards	21 February 1942	28 November 1942	27 March 1943	Sunk by USS Haddo on 22 August 1944, Hidai Bay, Philippines [14-15N, 120-25E]
隠岐	Oki	Uraga Dock Company	27 February 1942	20 October 1942	28 March 1943	Ceded to Republic of China Navy as Gu An (固安) in August 1947, captured by PLAN and renamed Chang Bai (长白) in 1949, scrapped 1982
六連	Mutsure	Hitachi-Sakurajima Shipyards	25 July 1942	10 April 1943	31 July 1943	Sunk by USS Snapper on 2 September 1943, Philippine Sea [08-40N, 151-31E]
壱岐	Iki	Mitsui-Tamano Shipyards	2 May 1942	5 February 1943	31 May 1943	Sunk by USS Raton on 24 May 1944, 150 miles W of Sarawak
対馬	Tsushima	NKK-Tsurumi Shipyards	20 June 1942	20 March 1943	28 July 1943	Ceded to Republic of China Navy as Lin An (臨安) 31 July 1947, scrapped 1963
若宮	Wakamiya	Mitsui-Tamano Shipyards	16 July 1942	19 April 1943	10 August 1943	Sunk by USS Gato on 24 May 1944, East China Sea [28-38N, 122-05E]
平戸	Hirado	Hitachi-Sakurajima Shipyards	2 November 1942	30 June 1943	28 September 1943	Sunk by USS Growler on 12 September 1944, South China Sea [17-54N, 114-49]
福江	Fukae	Uraga Dock Company	30 October 1942	2 April 1943	28 June 1943	Ceded to UK in July 1947, scrapped
天草	Amakusa	Hitachi-Sakurajima Shipyards	5 April 1943	30 September 1943	20 November 1943	Sunk by Royal Navy aircraft 9 August 1945, Onagawa, Japan
満珠	Manju	Mitsui-Tamano Shipyards	15 February 1943	31 July 1943	30 November 1943	Scrapped 1946
干珠	Kanju	Uraga Dock Company	8 April 1943	7 August 1943	30 October 1943	Scuttled after mine damage, 15 August 1945, near Wonson, Korea [39-10N, 127-27E.]
笠戸	Kasado	Uraga Dock Company	10 August 1943	9 December 1943	27 February 1944	Scrapped 1948
