= Japanese escort ship Miyake =

Mikura-class escort ship of the Imperial Japanese Navy

History

Japan
- Name: Miyake; (みやけ)
- Namesake: Miyake-jima
- Builder: NKK, Tsurumi
- Laid down: 12 February 1943
- Launched: 30 August 1943
- Commissioned: 30 November 1943
- Decommissioned: 30 November 1945
- Identification: Pennant number: 320
- Fate: Scrapped, 2 July 1948

General characteristics
- Class & type: Mikura class escort ship
- Displacement: 940 long tons (955 t) standard
- Length: 77.7 m (255 ft)
- Beam: 9.1 m (29 ft 10 in)
- Draught: 3.05 m (10 ft)
- Propulsion: 2 shaft, geared diesel engines, 4,400 hp (3,281 kW)
- Speed: 19.5 knots (36.1 km/h; 22.4 mph)
- Range: 5,000 nmi (9,300 km; 5,800 mi) at 16 kn (30 km/h; 18 mph)
- Complement: 150
- Armament: As built : 3 × 120 mm (4.7 in)/45 cal DP guns; 4 × Type 96 25 mm (0.98 in) AA machine guns (2×2); 6 × depth charge throwers; 120 × depth charges; From 1944 : 3 × 120 mm (4.7 in)/45 cal DP guns; 14-18 × 25 mm (0.98 in) AA machine guns; 6 × depth charge throwers; 120 × depth charges; 1 × 81 mm (3.2 in) mortar

Miyake (三宅) was a Mikura-class escort ship of Imperial Japanese Navy.

== Construction and career ==
She was laid down on 12 February 1943 and launched on 30 August 1943 by the Nippon Kokan Tsurumi Shipyard. She was commissioned on 30 November 1943.

=== 1943 ===
She was homeported in Kure Naval District. She was the Commander-in-Chief of the Maritime Escort General Headquarters (Commander-in-Chief Koshiro Oikawa, Admiral of the Navy, 15 November,) Incorporated into the 1st Maritime Escort Flotilla. After she waits at Yokosuka Port, she escorts the 2705 fleet from 5 to 7 December. She moves to Kure and conducts training. From 21 December of the same year, she was engaged in the escort mission of the 123rd Fleet (from Moji to Kaohsiung Port) consisting of nine transport vessels. On 27 December, of the 27 fleets escorted by the Etorofu-class escort ship Matsuwa and heading for Singapore, the tanker Kueimaru sank due to a torpedo attack from a US submarine. Miyake and escort ships engaged in anti-submarine warfare, and both ships entered Kaohsiung on the 29th (30th).

=== 1944 ===
From 20 January, Miyake and Etorofu-class escort pearls have been engaged in escort missions for the Hi-37 fleet (from Moji, via Manila, to Singapore). At that time, the light aircraft carrier Chitose (belonging to the 3rd Carrier Division) and the 16th Destroyer Flotilla (Amatsukaze and Yukikaze) belonging to the 3rd Fleet of the Combined Fleet (commander-in-chief Jisaburo Ozawa). She was temporarily incorporated into the 3rd Carrier Division and was engaged in a fleet escort mission between the inland and Singapore. However, on 16 January during the escort of the Hi-31 fleet, the destroyer Amatsukaze was sunk by a torpedo strike from USS Redfin and became inoperable. On 20 January, the Hi-31 fleet unit arrived in Singapore. On the return trip, the Hi-31 fleet was renamed the Hi-32 fleet and departed Singapore on 25 January. Miyake was peeked out of the Hi-37 fleet, which went to Singapore. Miyake, who remained in Manila, left the area on the 27th at 07:30 and joined the Hi-32 fleet (Chitose, Yukikaze, Tanker fleet). From 4 to 5 February, each of the Hi-32 fleet units returned to Kitakyushu and Kure.

After replenishment and maintenance in Kure, Miyake moved to Moji. On 16 February, Miyake took the tanker Kuroshio Maru, Tamatsu Maru, and Tatekawa Maru. She escorted the Hi-45 fleet, which consisted of 7 transport vessels (10,090 tons), along with Shiokaze, and left Monji. On the evening of 19 February, the Hi-40 fleet unit (ship escorts, Asama Maru, 5 tankers) heading north toward Kaohsiung was attacked by USS Jack. Shiokaze separates from the fleet and heads for the escort of the Hi-40 fleet. On the 21st, the Hi-45 fleet arrives in Kaohsiung, and Miyake warns against submarine outside Kaohsiung Port. At night, Miyake moved to Zuoying. On the 22nd, the fleet departed Kaohsiung for the escort of the torpedo boat Hayabusa. Shortly thereafter, Miyake, who left Zuoying on the same day, joins. After that, the tanker Kuroshio Maru had an engine failure and headed for Kaohsiung. On the 23rd, Tamatsu Maru separated from the fleet unit with Hayabusa and headed for Manila. On the same day, Shiokaze, finished escorting the Hi-40 fleet, joins the Hi-40 fleet. On the 27th, the Hi-45 convoy arrived in Singapore.

From 4 to 5 March, Miyake temporarily escorted the Hi-47 fleet (Etorofu and Iki) approaching Singapore. The fleet was attacked by USS Bluefish, and the Omineyama Maru sank on the 4th. On 11, 4 March escort ships (Miyake, Shimushu, Iki, and Etorofu) depart Singapore to escort the Hi-48 fleet. After 01:00 am on 18 March, the Hokuriku Maru was sunk by a torpedo attack by USS Rapon, and her survivors were rescued by the escort ships. After stopping at Kaohsiung, the Hi-48 fleet unit returned to Moji on 25 March.

On 30 March, Miyake and Manju were attached to the Combined Fleet. On 28 May, She escorted Ashizuri and Zuihō. On the morning of 5 June, the US Navy USS Puffer attacks the oil tank fleet units while sailing in the Sulu Sea. Ashizuri and Zuihō were sunk.

On the 18th, the Imperial Headquarters launched Operation Sho-go. It was necessary to refuel the 1st Squadron (commonly known as Kurita Squadron or Kurita Fleet) and the 2nd Squadron (commander Kiyohide Shima, Commander-in-Chief of the 5th Fleet, commonly known as Shima Fleet). As a result, the Army and Navy Department of the Great Headquarters was confused over the arrangement of tankers. Vice Admiral Takeo Kurita, Commander-in-Chief of the 2nd Fleet, was forced to secure tankers, and as part of this, ordered the Niei Maru and Ryoei Maru to wait for Sanya on Hainan Island. Eventually, 4 tankers (Niei Maru, Ryoei Maru, Kuroshio Maru, Toho Maru) were pulled out of the Hi-76 fleet to supply the troops. The Hi-76 fleet was virtually disassembled in the air. Miyake and Manju will escort Ryoei Maru and move to Penghu Islands Makou. On the 20th, 09:30, she arrived at Makou and replenished the 2nd Squadron. On the 22nd, 07:00, Secretary Kurita formed a supply unit, and a second supply unit was formed by 3 escort ships (Kurahashi, Miyake, Manju) and two tankers (Niei Maru, Ryoei Maru). On 23 October, Ma departed. After conducting anti-submarine sweeping, she entered Xiamen City on the opposite bank of Taiwan on the 26th. On the 29th, under the command of Captain Kagayama, the captain of Shimo Miyake, Miyake and his consort ship depart from Ma, escorting the special survey ship (special repair ship) Shimo (27 October, as Mi 23 fleet, arrived at Ma). Initially ordered to advance to Brunei, Borneo, but was later relocated to Singapore.

As of 20 November, the 31st Squadron was incorporated into the 5th Fleet (Lt. Gen. Kiyohide Shima, Commander-in-Chief, Lieutenant General Kiyohide Shima, flagship Ashigara, Commander of the 2nd Squadron) and divided into the Battle of Ormoc Bay. On 30 December, the air raid caused damage to the No. 20 Kaibokan and the sinking of the Aobayama Maru, but Miyake was not damaged.

=== 1945 ===
From midnight to early morning on 9 January, in Kaohsiung City, Taiwan, the Hi-87 Convoy Unit (the commander of the unit is the 7th Convoy Commander, General Katsumi Komazawa, Flagship Kamoi, Shigure, Isokaze, Hatakaze, refueling ships such as the escort ship Mikura and Kurahashi, and eight other ships) had arrived. However, she was soon attacked by a carrier-based aircraft of the US 38th Task Force. Kamoi was damaged. At sea, Kaihomaru was sunk and Yashiro was damaged. Miyake left Kaohsiung on 10 January as a unit of the Hi-87 fleet that separated damaged ships and undamaged ships, and left Kaohsiung on 10 January at midnight (14th morning). Arrived in Hong Kong. The Hi-87 fleet unit was also hit by air raids on US MTF carrier-based aircraft in Hong Kong. Others were heavily damaged or sunk, and several ships such as Noumi and Kurahashi were damaged.

On 19 March, there was an attack on Kure and an anti-aircraft battle was conducted. In mid-April, 4 escort ships under the command of Captain Ei Ikeda, commander of the 1st Escort Flotilla (Noumi, No. 31 Kaibokan, Miyake, No. 213 Kaibokan <changed to No. 39 Kaibokan on the way>) Escort the Moshi 02 fleet (cargo ship Kotobukiyama Maru, Dalian Kisen 3,943 tons). The Moshi 02 fleet, which departed from Monji at 6 am on 11 April, stayed at Hiyojima in the northwestern part of Jeju Island at 2:00 pm on 13 April. Before dawn on the 14th, the USS Tirante attacks the Moshi 02 fleet, which was moored inside the harbor. Kotobukiyama Maru, Mikura-class escort ship Nomi, the 31st Kaibokan were sunk. On 18 April, Miyake returned to Moji. On 22 April, she escorted Jilin Maru and left Moji. However, Jilin Maru became unable to navigate through mines, and Miyake engaged in a patrol mission between Jeju Island and Tsushima.

She heads to Qingdao on 8 May. She moved to Ishijima on 17 May, and left Ishijima on 19 May as an escort for the Daiseimaru fleet. She arrived at Daito Bay on the 21st. On 22 May, she left Daito Bay. She escorted Koyo Maru and arrived at Ishijima on the 24th. On the same day, she bombarded the land battle. On 25 May, she left Ishijima. She escorted Tatsumiya Maru and Okitsu Maru and arrived at Daito Bay on the 26th. In June, she entered Sasebo Port. She left Sasebo on 1 August and moved to Yobuko fishing port. She arrived at Wonsan Port in Korea on 7 August. She left Motoyama on the 10th and moved to Yeongil Bay. She ended the war there. She was mined and damaged near Moji, Kitakyushu on 21 August.

After the war, she was engaged in lift transportation as an auxiliary ship. She was dismantled by Sasebo Heavy Industries from May to July 1948.
