= Mikura-class escort ship =

1943 class of Japanese escort ships

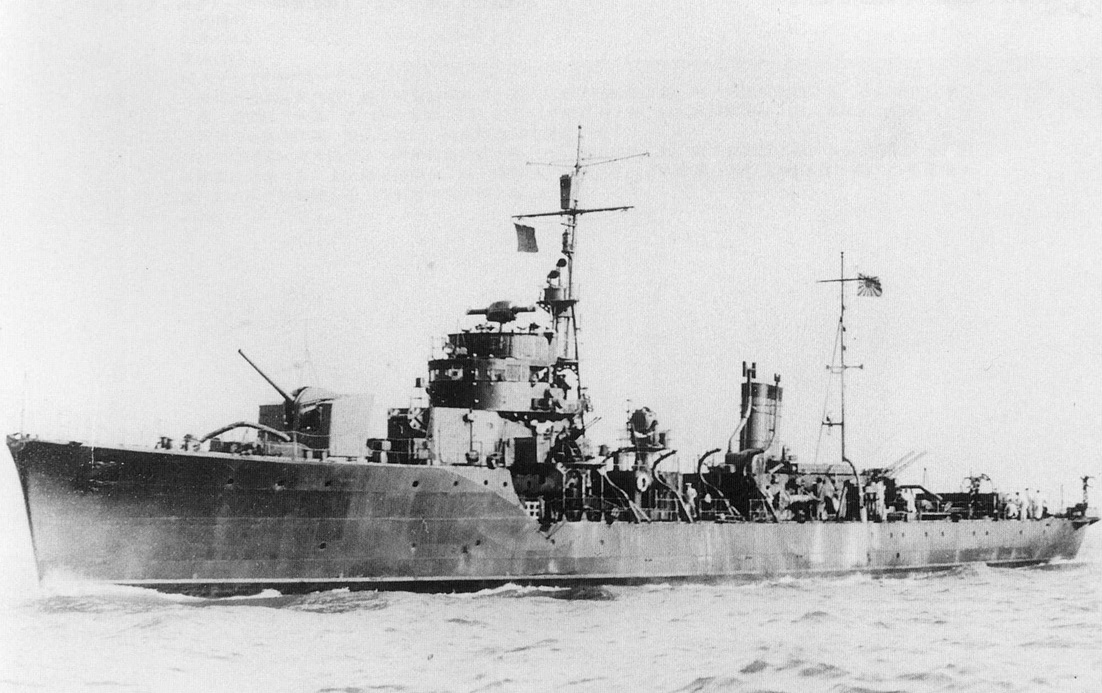
- Nomi in 1944

Class overview
- Name: Mikura class
- Builders: Nihon Kōkan (5); Hitachi Zōsen (3)
- Operators: Imperial Japanese Navy; Republic of China Navy
- Preceded by: Etorofu class
- Succeeded by: Ukuru class
- Built: 1942–1944
- In commission: 1943–1948
- Completed: 8
- Lost: 5

General characteristics
- Type: Escort ship
- Displacement: 940 long tons (955 t) standard
- Length: 77.7 m (255 ft)
- Beam: 9.1 m (29 ft 10 in)
- Draught: 3.05 m (10 ft)
- Propulsion: 2 shaft, geared diesel engines, 4,400 hp (3,281 kW)
- Speed: 19.5 knots (36.1 km/h; 22.4 mph)
- Range: 5,000 nmi (9,300 km; 5,800 mi) at 16 kn (30 km/h; 18 mph)
- Complement: 150
- Armament: As built : 3 × 120 mm (4.7 in)/45 cal DP guns; 4 × Type 96 25 mm (0.98 in) AA machine guns (2×2); 6 × depth charge throwers; 120 × depth charges; From 1944 : 3 × 120 mm (4.7 in)/45 cal DP guns; 14-18 × 25 mm (0.98 in) AA machine guns; 6 × depth charge throwers; 120 × depth charges; 1 × 81 mm (3.2 in) mortar

The Mikura-class escort ships (御蔵型海防艦, Mikura-gata kaibōkan) were a class of eight kaibōkan escort vessels built for the Imperial Japanese Navy during World War II. Five of the eight ships were sunk during the war. The class was also referred to by internal Japanese documents as the "B-class" coastal defense vessel (乙型海防艦, Otsu-gata kaibōkan).

== Background ==
The Mikura-class kaibōkan, as with the Chidori class torpedo boat, was a consequence of the 1930 London Naval Treaty, which placed limitations on the total destroyer tonnage the Imperial Japanese Navy was permitted. One way in which the treaty could be circumvented was to use a loophole in the treaty which permitted ships of between 600 and 2,000 tons, with no more than four guns over 76mm, no torpedoes, and with a maximum speed of no more than 20 knots. A new class of vessel was designed to use this loophole, and was given the obsolete designation of kaibōkan (Kai = sea, ocean, Bo = defence, Kan = ship), which had previously been used to designate obsolete battleships which had been reassigned to coastal defense duties. The first of these vessels were the Shimushu class and Etorofu; however, after the start of the Pacific War, it became apparent that a design more capable of anti-submarine warfare was needed. The 1941 Rapid Naval Armaments Supplement Programme authorized eight of these new vessels, which were designated the Mikura-class.

Production began in late 1942 concurrently with later Etorofu-class vessels.

== Description ==
Although the Mikura-class was based on the two previous classes of escort vessels and used a simplified version of the Etorofu-class hull, it presented a much different appearance, with a stepped bridge, smaller single smokestack located further aft, shape of the aft deckhouse, and the type of main gun.

The ships measured 77.7 meters (254 ft 11 in) overall, with a beam of 9.1 meters (29 ft 10 in) and a draft of 3.05 meters (10 ft 0 in). They displaced 960 metric tons (940 long tons) at standard load and 970 metric tons (955 long tons) at deep load. The ships had two diesel engines, each driving one propeller shaft, which were rated at a total of 4,400 brake horsepower (3,300 kW) for a speed of 19.5 knots (36.1 km/h; 22.4 mph). The ships had a range of 5,000 nautical miles (9,300 km; 5,800 mi) at a speed of 16 knots (30 km/h; 18 mph).

The main battery of the Mikura-class consisted of three Type 10 120 mm AA guns — one in an enclosed turret forward and two in an open twin mount aft. These were dual-purpose guns capable of attacking both surface and aircraft targets. Anti-aircraft protection was by four Type 96 25-millimeter (1.0 in) anti-aircraft guns in two twin-gun mounts abreast the bridge. The Mikura class was initially armed with 120 Type 95 depth charges with two Type 94 depth charge launchers and had a Model 93 sonar and a Type 93 hydrophone.

Later in the war, a third Type 94 depth charge launcher was added on the stern and the paravanes were removed. During the Pacific War, the number of Type 96 anti-aircraft guns was increased with the addition of a triple-mount in front of the bridge and an additional four single-mounts. A Type 22 and a Type 13 radar were also added. A Type 97 81-millimeter (3.2 in) trench mortar was also installed front of the bridge

== Operational service ==
All eight vessels in the class saw extensive combat service in the South China Sea and the East China Sea, where they were used for convoy escort. Two American submarines may have been destroyed by Mikura-class vessels, with Chiburi given credit for the sinking of USS Growler on 8 November 1944 and Mikura given credit for assisting in the destruction of USS Trigger on March 28, 1945. Of the eight vessels in the class, five were lost in combat (four to USN submarines). One ship survived the war to be used for repatriation duties and one was given as a reparations to the Republic of China Navy, under whose flag it continued to serve until scrapped in 1963.

== Ships in class ==
Number	Kanji	Name	Builder	Laid down	Launched	Completed	Fate
#320	御蔵	Mikura	Nihon Kōkan	1 October 1942	16 July 1943	31 October 1943	Sunk by USS Threadfin on 28 March 1945, SW of Shikoku [31-45N, 131-45E]
#322	三宅	Miyake	Nihon Kōkan	12 February 1943	30 August 1943	30 November 1943	Scrapped 2 July 1948
#324	淡路	Awaji	Hitachi Zōsen	1 June 1943	30 October 1943	25 January 1944	Sunk by USS Picuda on 2 June 1944, Bashi Strait [22-34N, 121-51E]
#326	能美	Nōmi	Hitachi Zōsen	10 August 1943	3 December 1943	28 February 1944	Sunk by USS Tirante on 14 April 1945, NW of Jeju Island [33-25N, 126-15E]
#327	倉橋	Kurahashi	Nihon Kōkan	1 June 1943	15 October 1943	19 February 1944	Ceded to UK in 1947, scrapped 1948
#329	千振	Chiburi	Nihon Kōkan	20 July 1943	30 November 1943	3 April 1944	Sunk by USN aircraft 12 January 1945 off Cape St. Jacques [10-20N, 107-50E]
#331	屋代	Yashiro	Hitachi Zōsen	18 November 1943	16 February 1944	10 May 1944	Ceded to Republic of China Navy 29 August 1947, renamed Cheng An, scrapped 1963
#334	草垣	Kusagaki	Nihon Kōkan	7 September 1943	12 January 1944	1 July 1944	Sunk by USS Guitarro on 14 April 1945, Off Capones Island, Luzon [14-50N, 119-57E]

== See also ==
- Etorofu-class escort ship
- Hiburi-class escort ship
- Ukuru-class escort ship
- Type C escort ship
- Type D escort ship
- Destroyer escort
- Tacoma-class frigate
- Flower-class corvette
