= W26 =

W26 may refer to:

- Japanese minesweeper W-26
- Small triambic icosahedron
- Thalanyji language
- Westerlund 1 W26
