= Japanese escort ship Kurahashi =

Mikura-class escort ship of the Imperial Japanese Navy

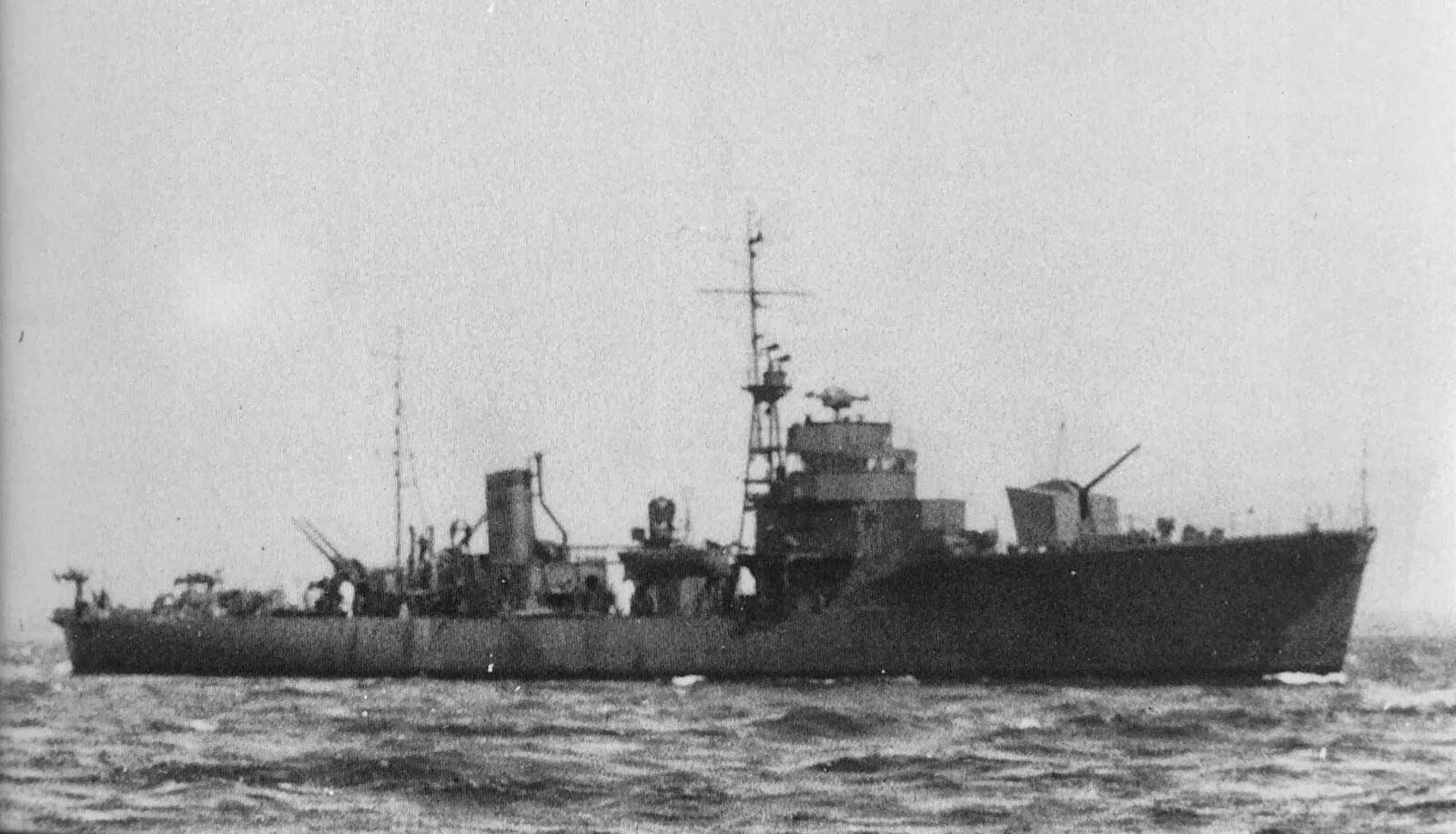
- Kurahashi in 1944

History

Japan
- Name: Kurahashi; (くらはし)
- Namesake: Kurahashi-jima
- Builder: NKK, Tsurumi
- Laid down: 1 June 1943
- Launched: 15 October 1943
- Commissioned: 19 February 1944
- Decommissioned: 30 November 1945
- Identification: Pennant number: 327
- Fate: Scrapped, 15 January 1948

General characteristics
- Class & type: Mikura class escort ship
- Displacement: 940 long tons (955 t) standard
- Length: 77.7 m (255 ft)
- Beam: 9.1 m (29 ft 10 in)
- Draught: 3.05 m (10 ft)
- Propulsion: 2 shaft, geared diesel engines, 4,400 hp (3,281 kW)
- Speed: 19.5 knots (36.1 km/h; 22.4 mph)
- Range: 5,000 nmi (9,300 km; 5,800 mi) at 16 kn (30 km/h; 18 mph)
- Complement: 150
- Armament: As built : 3 × 120 mm (4.7 in)/45 cal DP guns; 4 × Type 96 25 mm (0.98 in) AA machine guns (2×2); 6 × depth charge throwers; 120 × depth charges; From 1944 : 3 × 120 mm (4.7 in)/45 cal DP guns; 14-18 × 25 mm (0.98 in) AA machine guns; 6 × depth charge throwers; 120 × depth charges; 1 × 81 mm (3.2 in) mortar

Kurahashi (倉橋) was a Mikura-class escort ship of Imperial Japanese Navy.

== Construction and career ==
She was laid down on 1 June 1943 and launched on 30 October 1943 by the Nippon Kokan Tsurumi Shipyard. She was commissioned on 25 January 1944.

=== 1944 ===
On March 10, 1944, Kurahashi was removed from the Kure Defense Squadron. On the 10th, she was transferred to the 1st Maritime Escort Flotilla, which is in charge of defense of the southwestern sea lane under the control of the Maritime Escort General Command. At the same time, the light aircraft carrier Kaiyo was equipped with a Type 97 carrier-based attack aircraft of the 93rd Navy Air Corps and was training in Saiki, Kyushu. From the 11th to the 16th, Kurahashi will cooperate with Kaiyo's landing training. After the training, Kaiyō was transferred to the 1st Maritime Escort Flotilla on March 17. Kaiyo and Kurahashi headed for Kure. Kurahashi stayed in Kure until the 21st. She made a round trip to Moji on the 21st. On the 23rd, she escorted the Mota-13 fleet (12 ships) with the 26th submarine chaser and left Moji. She arrived in Kaohsiung, Taiwan on the 30th, while she left the fleet to control anti-submarine warfare on the 29th.

From August 5, Hirado, Kurahashi, and Mikura will be maintained at the Sasebo Naval Arsenal. After the maintenance, each ship made a round trip to Imari, joined with the Hi-71 fleet, and departed six stations. On the 10th, the Hi-71 fleet unit (Otaka, Fujinami, Yunagi, Hirado, Kurahashi, Mikura, Shonan) commanded by General Kajioka Sadamichi, commander of the 6th escort fleet. Fleet of participating ships, Lake Irago and about 20 others) departed from Imari. After leaving the port, one ship left due to a breakdown, but entered the port at Penghu Islands Magong, a transit point, without any particular damage. In the same area, the support destroyer Asakaze and four sea defense ships of the anti-submarine flotilla (Sado, Matsuwa, Etorofu, Nisshin) will be added. On the 17th, the Hi-71 fleet departed from Magong and headed for Manila, but from the 18th to the 19th, eight US submarines such as the USS Flasher attacked and eight ships were hit by torpedoes, including Otaka. Five ships sank during the attack. Kurahashi escorted the Army charterer Nissho Maru, who had separated from the fleet, and entered Manila on the 21st. Three sea defense vessels (Sado, Matsuwa, and Nisshin), which had been separated from the Hi-71 fleet and were conducting anti-submarine sweeping, were also wiped out by the attacks from the USS Harder and USS Haddo on the 22nd, just before entering Manila.

At the same time as the arrival of the Hi-68 fleet in Manila, the Hi-69 fleet (Major General Yoshitomi, the fifth escort fleet commander, the flagship Kashii), and three light aircraft carriers to transport the aircraft to the southwest. In the same area, the Moma-fleet (the route between Monji and Manila), and Otaka, who completed the aircraft transport mission with the former Hi-69 fleet, will join the Hi-68 fleet. On the 23rd, the reorganized Hi-68 fleet unit (16 participating vessels such as Hirado, Kurahashi, Mikura, Kusagaki, and Otaka) departs Manila.

From the 25th to the 26th, while sailing to Kaohsiung, three submarines USS Angler, USS Flasher, and USS Crevalle would attack the Hi-68 fleet one after another. Four ships were sunk by torpedoes. Kurahashi rescues the Army charterer Aki Maru and wipes out the anti-submarine. After entering Kaohsiung, both the fleet and the fleet escort unit were reorganized, and Hirado, Kurahashi, Mikura, etc. continued to escort the Hi-68 fleet from Kaohsiung on the 28th. On the 30th, the Hi-68 fleet unit arrived off the coast of Rokuren. Arrived at Moji on August 3.

=== 1945 ===
January 6-7, the Hi-87 fleet unit temporarily stays outside the port of Keelung, Taiwan. At 11:25 am on the 7th, the Army dividend ship Sozo Maru was damaged by a torpedo attack from USS Picuda. The Hi-87 convoy unit precedes Kaohsiung, Taiwan, and the commander of the 17th Destroyer Squadron takes command of the Sozomaru guard. Kurahashi was ordered to escort Munakata Maru and remained. The 17th Destroyer Flotilla (Hamakaze and Isokaze) turned around when Ryuho arrived at Keelung and joined Sozomaru and Kurahashi. Sozomaru was escorted by three ships (Hamakaze, Isokaze, and Kurahashi) and was able to arrive at Keelung. After that, Hamakaze and Isokaze hurriedly preceded the merger with the fleet unit, and Kurahashi was instructed to make a round trip to Kaohsiung. On the 9th, the Hi-87 Fleet Unit arrived in Kaohsiung, but was attacked by a carrier-based aircraft of the US 38th Task Force. Damage to ships and bases around Taiwan.

On February 3, 1945, she escorted the Tamo-40 fleet. On February 5, she joined the 1st Escort Flotilla. Kurahashi made a round trip to Sasebo and docked and repaired at the Sasebo Naval Arsenal from 13th to 5th March.

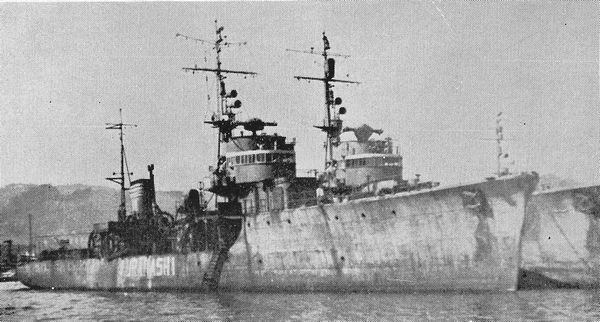
Kurahashi in 1947

She left Sasebo on March 5 for her joint venture with the Hi-88F fleet. She went through Lighthouse-Hikoshima and joined the fleet at the northern end of Tsushima on the 7th. She arrived on the 8th and she arrived six times in a row. On the 14th, she escorted the Mota-42 fleet (2 ships) and fired 6 times. On the way, she passed through the southern part of Daicho Kanayama and the Daihoku archipelago and arrived in Keelung on the 27th. On the 31st, she escorted the Tamo-52 fleet (2 ships) and started Keelung. After she arrived inland, she engaged in convoy escort on the southern coast of the Korean Peninsula.

Located in Motoyama at the end of the war. On August 15, she made a round trip to Ominato. On the 25th, she was designated as the Yokosuka Naval District First Reserve Kaibokan. She has been minesweeping off Muroran since September 15th. She was removed from the Imperial Kaibokan on November 30, following the abolition of the Ministry of the Navy.

On December 1, 1945, by the opening of the 2nd Ministry of Demobilization, it was designated as a minesweeper for the local demobilization in the Ominato district, and continued to engage in minesweeping.

March 1946, Yashiro, Sea No. 48, Sea No. 49, Sea No. 77, USS Shoveler and USS Redstart were minesweeping in the sea near Kikaijima based on Amami Oshima.

On September 1, she was converted to an auxiliary ship for the Ominato District Demobilization Local Tube, but on the same day she was designated as a special storage ship and she was assigned to the Yokosuka Special Storage Ship No. 4 Storage Group.

On March 31, 1947, due to the abolition of the Ominato District Demobilization Bureau, the jurisdiction was changed to the Yokosuka District Demobilization Bureau. On September 4, the special transport ship will be lifted. She was handed over to England as a compensation ship on the 14th, but she was sold. It is said that the British Army had surplus escort destroyers transferred from the United States and some escort ships such as destroyers built in their own country, so it takes more time to maintain than those. She was dismantled at the Nagoya dock on January 15, 1948. Kurahashi's dismantling was carried out by the Group 4 work arrangement group and ended on November 1, 1947.
