= W-19-class minesweeper =

Class of Imperial Japanese Navy minesweepers

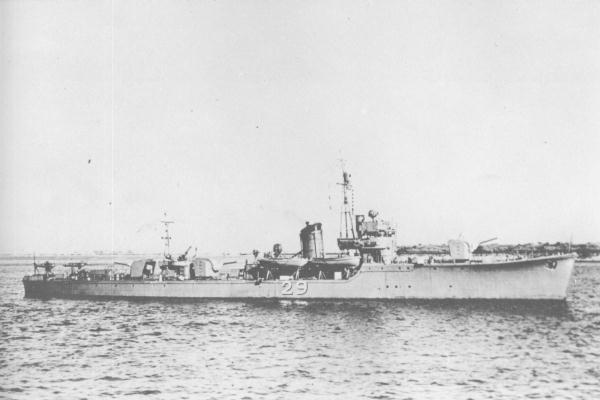
- No.29 on 22 October 1943

Class overview
- Name: No.19 class minesweeper
- Builders: Kure Naval Arsenal; Fujinagata Shipyards; Harima Shipyard; Mitsubishi Heavy Industries; Tōkyō Ishikawajima Shipyard
- Operators: Imperial Japanese Navy; Soviet Navy
- Preceded by: No.7 class
- Cost: 2,660,000 JPY (in 1939)
- Built: 1940 – 1944
- In commission: 1941 – 1945 (IJN)
- Planned: 70
- Completed: 17
- Canceled: 53
- Lost: 15
- Retired: 2

General characteristics
- Displacement: 648 long tons (658 t) standard
- Length: 72.50 m (237 ft 10 in) overall
- Beam: 7.85 m (25 ft 9 in)
- Draught: 2.61 m (8 ft 7 in)
- Propulsion: 2 × Kampon geared turbines; 2 × Kampon mix-fired boilers; 2 shafts, 3,850 shp
- Speed: 20.0 knots (23.0 mph; 37.0 km/h)
- Range: 2,000 nmi (3,700 km) at 14 kn (16 mph; 26 km/h)
- Complement: 98
- Armament: 3 × 120 mm (4.7 in) L/45 naval guns; 2 × 25 mm AA guns; 36 × depth charges; 1 × Type 94 depth charge projector; 6 × paravanes

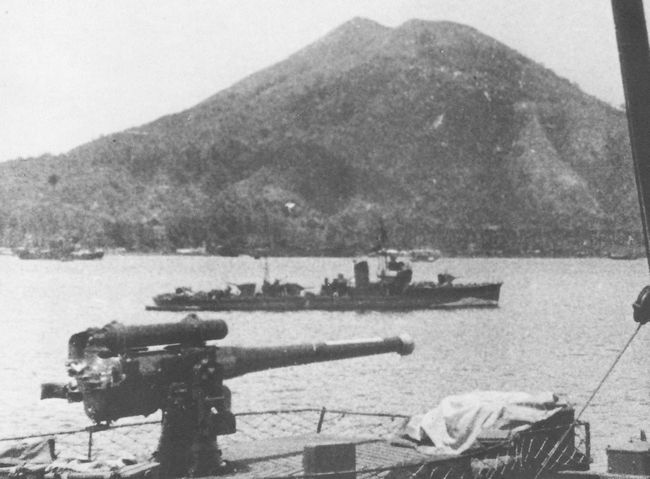
No. 20

The No.19 class minesweeper (第十九号型掃海艇,, Dai Jūkyū Gō-gata Sōkaitei) was a class of minesweepers of the Imperial Japanese Navy (IJN), serving during World War II. 70 vessels were planned under the Maru 4 Programme (Ship # 164–169), Maru Kyū Programme (Ship # 410–437) and Kai-Maru 5 Programme (Ship # 5301–5336), however, only 17 vessels were completed.

== Background ==
- Project number I4B. Improved model of the No.7-class. The IJN gave them a turret of 55 degrees gun elevation, because the IJN wanted to attack the strong point of behind the hill to them. And it was not useful in the Pacific War very much.
- And after the Maru Kyū Programme vessels abolished double-curvature bow for a mass production and changed bow shape.

== Ships in class ==
Ship #	Ship	Builder	Laid down	Launched	Completed	Fate
164	No.19	Tōkyō Ishikawajima Shipyard	17 September 1940	18 February 1941	31 May 1941	Sunk by air raid at the mouth of the Cagayan River on 10 December 1941. Removed from naval ship list on 30 November 1945.
165	No.20	Tōkyō Ishikawajima Shipyard	19 March 1941	17 September 1941	15 December 1941	Sunk by USS Trepang at Yellow Sea 34°16′N 123°37′E on 5 May 1945. Removed from naval ship list on 25 May 1945.
166	No.21	Harima Shipyard	20 September 1941	28 February 1942	29 June 1942	Decommissioned on 25 October 1945. Surrendered to United States on 1 October 1947. Sunk as target at 35°19′N 123°31′E on 7 October 1947.
167	No.22	Tōkyō Ishikawajima Shipyard	6 October 1941	28 April 1942	31 July 1942	Sunk by air raid at Palau on 11 November 1944. Removed from naval ship list on 10 January 1945.
168	No.23	Tōkyō Ishikawajima Shipyard	5 May 1942	13 January 1943	31 March 1943	Decommissioned on 30 November 1945. Surrendered to Soviet Union on 3 October 1947.
169	No.24	Harima Shipyard	5 May 1942	16 September 1942	25 January 1943	Sunk by air raid at Tsugaru Strait on 15 July 1945. Removed from naval ship list on 10 August 1945.
410	No.25	Kure Naval Arsenal			30 April 1943	Sunk by air raid at Chichi-jima on 4 July 1944. Removed from naval ship list on 10 September 1944.
411	No.26	Mitsubishi, Yokohama Shipyard			31 March 1943	Sunk by air raid at Rabaul on 17 February 1944. Removed from naval ship list on 30 April 1944.
412	No.27	Harima Shipyard	10 June 1942	23 February 1943	31 July 1943	Sunk by USS Runner off Yamada 39°20′N 142°07′E on 10 July 1945. Removed from naval ship list on 15 September 1945.
413	No.28	Kure Naval Arsenal			28 June 1943	Sunk by USS Jack at Celebes Sea 01°25′N 123°29′E on 29 August 1944. Removed from naval ship list on 10 October 1944.
414	No.29	Tōkyō Ishikawajima Shipyard			22 October 1943	Struck a naval mine and sunk off Shimonoseki on 7 May 1945. Removed from naval ship list on 10 August 1945.
415	No.30	Tōkyō Ishikawajima Shipyard			5 February 1944	Sunk by air raid at Ormoc Bay on 11 November 1944. Removed from naval ship list on 10 January 1945.
416–417						Cancelled in 1945.
418	No.33	Mitsubishi, Yokohama Shipyard			31 July 1943	Sunk by air raid at Onagawa Bay on 9 August 1945. Removed from naval ship list on 15 September 1945.
419	No.34	Tōkyō Ishikawajima Shipyard			29 May 1944	Sunk by USS Chub at Java Sea 06°18′S 116°14′E on 21 May 1945. Removed from naval ship list on 10 June 1945.
420–422						Cancelled in 1945.
423	No.38	Fujinagata Shipyards			10 June 1944	Sunk by USS Atule at Bashi Channel 21°21′N 119°45′E on 19 November 1944. Removed from naval ship list on 10 March 1945.
424	No.39	Harima Shipyard	3 December 1943	24 February 1944	27 May 1944	Sunk by USS Threadfin at Yellow Sea 35°01′N 125°42′E on 20 July 1945. Removed from naval ship list on 15 September 1945.
425						Cancelled in 1945.
426	No.41	Fujinagata Shipyards			17 July 1944	Sunk by air raid at Hainan on 4 January 1945. Removed from naval ship list on 15 September 1945.
427–437						Cancelled in 1945.
5301–5336						Cancelled in 1944.

== Photo ==
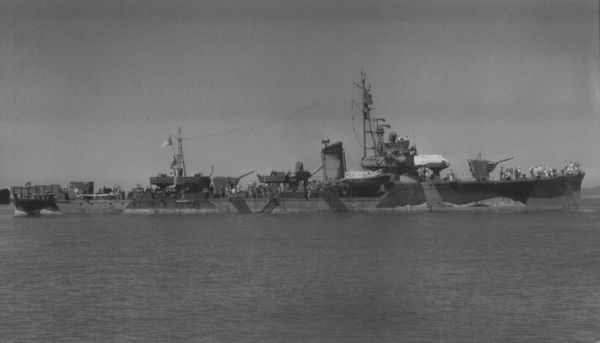
No.21 on 16 September 1945 at Qingdao

== Bibliography ==
- Dodson, Aidan & Cant, Serena (2020). Spoils of War: The Fate of Enemy Fleets after Two World Wars. Barnsley, UK: Seaforth Publishing. ISBN 978-1-5267-4198-1.
- "Rekishi Gunzō"., History of Pacific War Vol.51 The truth histories of the Japanese Naval Vessels Part-2, Gakken (Japan), August 2005, ISBN 4-05-604083-4
- Ships of the World special issue Vol.45, Escort Vessels of the Imperial Japanese Navy, "Kaijinsha"., (Japan), February 1996
- The Maru Special, Japanese Naval Vessels No.50, Japanese minesweepers and landing ships, "Ushio Shobō". (Japan), April 1981
- 50 year History of Harima Zōsen, Harima Zōsen Corporation, November 1960
