= George L. Street III =

US Navy Medal of Honor recipient (1913–2000)

George Levick Street III
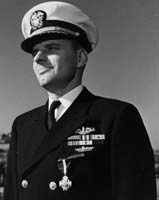
- Street in 1945
- Born: July 27, 1913; Richmond, Virginia, U.S.
- Died: February 26, 2000 (aged 86); Andover, Massachusetts, U.S.
- Burial place: Arlington National Cemetery
- Military career
- Allegiance: United States of America
- Branch: United States Navy
- Service years: 1931–1966
- Rank: Captain
- Commands: USS Tirante (SS-420); USS Requin (SS-481); USS Holder (DDE-819); Submarine Division 62; USS Fremont (APA-44); NROTC Unit MIT; Submarine Squadron 5 Submarine Group, San Francisco Bay Area; Commander Mare Island Group, Pacific Reserve Fleet
- Conflicts: World War II
- Awards: Medal of Honor; Navy Cross; Silver Star (2)

George Levick Street III (July 27, 1913 – February 26, 2000) was a submariner in the United States Navy. He received the Medal of Honor during World War II.

== Early life and career ==
Street was born in Richmond, Virginia. He joined the Naval Reserve in 1931 and was selected for an appointment to the U.S. Naval Academy in 1933; he graduated in 1937.

After serving in the gunnery and communications departments of USS Concord (CL-10) and the navigation and engineering departments of USS Arkansas (BB-33), he volunteered for the Submarine School at New London, Connecticut. After graduating, Street served three years in USS Gar (SS-206), from her commissioning on April 14, 1941, until February 27, 1944. Street served in this fleet submarine, first as Gunnery and Torpedo Officer, then as First Lieutenant and Torpedo Data Computer Operator and finally as Executive Officer and Navigator.

== World War II ==
While serving in Gar, he made nine war patrols. Street received two Silver Stars "for conspicuous gallantry and intrepidity in action against the enemy while serving as Assistant Approach Officer aboard the ... U.S.S. GAR (SS-206)" on Gar's first and tenth patrols.

On July 6, 1944, LCDR Street reported to the Portsmouth Naval Shipyard to fit out the USS Tirante (SS-420), his first command. Commissioning the ship in November, the captain took his new boat for shakedown training in Long Island Sound and further training in waters off Panama and Hawaii. The ship's first war patrol, commencing March 3, 1945, was southwest of Kyūshū, Japan's southernmost island. By that point in the war, most of Japan's merchant fleet had already been sunk, but Street went into shallow water close to shore and found several ships.

Searching westward of Kyushu, Tirante patrolled the approaches to Nagasaki. She had good hunting. She sank the 703-ton tanker Fuji Maru on 25 March and followed this success with the sinking of the 1,218-ton freighter Nase Maru three days later. After the latter attack, Japanese escorts kept Tirante down for seven hours, before she slipped away from her hunters, unscathed.

On 31 March, Tirante shelled and sank a 70-ton lugger with 5-inch and 40-millimeter gunfire and, on 1 April, missed an LST-type vessel with a spread of three torpedoes. The submarine soon shifted to waters off the south coast of Korea, near the Strait of Tsushima. At twilight on 6 April, she battle-surfaced and captured a small Japanese fishing vessel and took its three crewmen prisoner before sinking the prize.

The following day, Tirante torpedoed a 2,800-ton cargo freighter loaded with a deck cargo of oil drums. The submarine surfaced, looked over the debris, and directed nearby Korean fishing craft to pick up two survivors who were clinging to pieces of wreckage. Nevertheless, although observers on the submarine reported witnessing the maru's sinking, post-war examination of Japanese records failed to confirm the "kill."

Having broken the Japanese codes, American naval intelligence men were able to anticipate Japanese movements. One intercepted enemy message told of an important convoy steaming toward Tirante's area. In response to this information, the submarine laid an ambush on 9 April. Picking out two targets, she fired three torpedoes at each. One spread missed, but the other struck the 5,500-ton transport Nikko Maru— carrying homeward-bound Japanese soldiers and sailors from Shanghai. As the important auxiliary slipped beneath the waves, enemy escorts leapt to the offensive. To ward off the counterattack, Tirante fired a "cutie" (a small anti-escort homing torpedo) at one of the escorts and heard subsequent "breaking-up noises." But again, post-war accounting failed to confirm the sinking.

On 15 April 1945, following a report from Naval Intelligence, Street took Tirante into Cheju harbor — on the surface, to avoid shoals and minefields. Using six of his seven remaining torpedoes, he sank a freighter and two of its escorts. For this action, Tirante was awarded the Presidential Unit Citation (US), Street received the Medal of Honor, and his executive officer, LT Edward L. Beach Jr., received the Navy Cross.

Beginning her second patrol, Tirante departed from Midway on 20 May 1945 as command ship of the nine-boat "wolfpack" dubbed "Street's Sweepers." They patrolled the Yellow and East China Seas on the lookout for enemy targets—by then dwindling in number. Tirante located a four-ship convoy on 11 June, in the first patrol's hunting grounds off Nagasaki. She evaded the three escorts long enough to get a shot at the lone merchantman, an 800-ton cargo freighter, and pressed home a successful attack. Post-war Japanese records, though, do not confirm a "kill."

The next day, Tirante pulled off nearly a repeat performance of her hit-and-run raid at Cheju. She crept into Ha Shima harbor, some seven miles from Nagasaki and picked out the 2,200-ton Hakuju Maru moored alongside a colliery. From a range of 1,000 yards, the submarine fired a "down the throat" shot at the maru which exploded with a roar. The second torpedo failed to detonate, but the third completed the destruction begun by the first. As shells from shore guns fell around her, Tirante bent on speed and cleared the area.

Resuming her roving patrols, Tirante and her sister submarines attacked shipping between Korea and Japan, destroying junks carrying supplies from Korea to the Japanese home islands. Boarding parties from the submarine would take off the masters for questioning, put the crew in life boats, and set the craft afire. Tirante sank a dozen in this manner and also destroyed two heavily armed picket boats with surface gunfire before returning to Guam on 19 July 1945. For this patrol, LCDR Street was awarded the Navy Cross. That citation reads in part "...For extraordinary heroism ...Tracking his targets relentlessly ...(he) launched his smashing torpedo and gunfire attacks against hostile freighters, junks and picket boats, sinking over 7000 tons of shipping vital to Japanese supply..."

Tirante departed Guam on 12 August 1945 on what would have been her third war patrol. The end of the war, however, cut this operation short and the submarine put into Midway on 23 August. Eventually sailing for the east coast of the United States, Tirante moored at the Washington Navy Yard in October – at which the newly promoted CDR Street received his Medal of Honor at a White House ceremony.

== World War II summary ==
Summary of CDR George L. Street III's USS Tirante (SS-420) War Patrols
	Departing From	Date	Days	Wartime Credit Ships/Tonnage	JANAC Credit Ships/Tonnage	Patrol Area
Tirante-1	Pearl Harbor, TH	March 1945	52	8 / 28,300	6 / 12,621	East China Sea
Tirante-2	Pearl Harbor, TH	May 20– July 19, 1945	57	3 / 7,400	2 / 3,265	East China Sea

CDR Street's Ranking Compared with Other Top Skippers
Ranking	Number of Patrols	Ships/Tons Credited	Ships/Tons JANAC
48	2	11 / 35,700	8 / 15,886

== Medal of Honor action ==
Tirante's first war patrol, beginning in March 1945, cost Japan at least six ships. Most notably while patrolling the Yellow Sea between Quelpart Island (Cheju Do) and the mouth of the Yangtze, she received an intelligence report which informed her that an important Japanese transport was at Cheju, the main port on Quelpart Island. Under cover of darkness, Tirante began her approach on the surface. In defiance of possible enemy radar or patrolling planes or ships, she closed the coast and penetrated the mine- and shoal-obstructed waters within the 10-fathom (60-foot) curve line. Prepared to fight her way out, Tirante then entered the harbor where she found three targets: two escort vessels and the 4,000-ton Juzan Maru.

The submarine launched three torpedoes at the maru, which blew up in a massive explosion.

"A tremendous, beautiful explosion," Commander Street would write in his report. "A great mushroom of white blinding flame shot 2,000 feet into the air. Not a sound was heard for a moment, but then a tremendous roar flattened our ears against our heads. The jackpot, and no mistake!"

The conflagration clearly illuminated Tirante and alerted the Mikura-class escort vessels Nomi and Kaibokan No. 31 which immediately got underway toward the invading submersible. While she headed back out to sea at flank speed, Tirante launched a spread of torpedoes which hit and destroyed both pursuers. En route to Midway, the submarine captured two Japanese airmen (bringing her prisoner total to five) and concluded her first war patrol on 25 April.

Tirante's stellar performance earned Comdr. Street the Medal of Honor. Lt. Edward L. Beach, the executive officer—and later commander of Triton (SSRN-586) during the submarine's submerged circumnavigation of the globe—received the Navy Cross. The ship, herself, was awarded the Presidential Unit Citation. His medal of citation reads:

For conspicuous gallantry and intrepidity at the risk of his life above and beyond the call of duty as commanding officer of the U.S.S. Tirante during the first war patrol of that vessel against enemy Japanese surface forces in the harbor of Cheju, Quelpart Island, off the coast of Korea, on 14 April 1945. With the crew at surface battle stations, Comdr. (then Lt. Comdr.) Street approached the hostile anchorage from the south within 1,200 yards [1,100 m] of the coast to complete a reconnoitering circuit of the island. Leaving the 10-fathom [18 m] curve far behind he penetrated the mined and shoal-obstructed waters of the restricted harbor despite numerous patrolling vessels and in defiance of 5 shore-based radar stations and menacing aircraft. Prepared to fight it out on the surface if attacked, Comdr. Street went into action, sending 2 torpedoes with deadly accuracy into a large Japanese ammunition ship and exploding the target in a mountainous and blinding glare of white flames. With the Tirante instantly spotted by the enemy as she stood out plainly in the flare of light, he ordered the torpedo data computer set up while retiring and fired his last 2 torpedoes to disintegrate in quick succession the leading frigate and a similar flanking vessel. Clearing the gutted harbor at emergency full speed ahead, he slipped undetected along the shoreline, diving deep as a pursuing patrol dropped a pattern of depth charges at the point of submergence. His illustrious record of combat achievement during the first war patrol of the Tirante characterizes Comdr. Street as a daring and skilled leader and reflects the highest credit upon himself, his valiant command, and the U.S. Naval Service.

However, Captain Street was most proud of Tirante's Presidential Unit Citation. "As Captain Street put it, 'I really treasure that more than the Medal of Honor because every man was there with us.'"

== Post-World War II ==
Street was promoted to Commander in July 1945 and, in January 1946, left Tirante to become the Navy's technical adviser for the submarine documentary film The Silent Service. That summer, he transferred to the Office of Naval Research and assisted in organizing the first Undersea Symposium. His next assignment, as Commanding Officer of USS Requin (SS-481), lasted from November 1946 to June 1948. This included operations as a radar picket submarine supporting aircraft carrier task forces. Following instruction at the Armed Forces Staff College at Norfolk, Virginia, in 1949, Commander Street served on its faculty in the Research and Development Division. In 1951, after attending the Fleet Sonar School at Key West, Florida, he assumed command of the USS Holder (DDE-819), a destroyer modified for anti-submarine purposes. Street commanded Submarine Division Sixty-Two 1952–1953, evaluating the use of several radar picket submarines working as a team. He then returned to the Office of the Chief of the Naval Operations as Assistant for the Joint Chiefs of Staff and Armed Forces Policy Council.

In July 1955, Street was promoted to captain. Upon completion of classes at the National War College in Washington, D.C., in July 1956, he served on the Staff to the Commander in Chief of the U.S. Atlantic Fleet. Returning to sea in July 1958, he commanded the attack transport USS Fremont (APA-44). A year later, Captain Street became Commanding Officer and Professor of Naval Science at the Massachusetts Institute of Technology at Cambridge, Massachusetts. In October 1961, he took command of Submarine Squadron Five and, the next fall, joined the Staff of the Naval War College. His final assignment, beginning in December 1964, was as Commander Submarine Group, San Francisco Bay Area and Commander Mare Island Group, Pacific Reserve Fleet. Upon his retirement, Captain Street was selected as the Senior Naval Science Instructor for one of the newly authorized Navy JROTC units located at Woburn High School, Woburn Massachusetts. He served in this position until 1977 when retired from the Woburn School system.

== Retirement and death ==
Captain Street retired from active duty on 10 August 1966. He resided in Andover, Massachusetts, and was a member of the Ancient and Honorable Artillery Company of Massachusetts.

George L. Street III died on 26 February 2000 at the Academy Manor Nursing Home in Andover. In keeping with his request, half his cremated remains were dispersed at sea from a submarine, and half were buried at Arlington National Cemetery on 15 March 2000.

== Popular culture ==
Edward Beach, Tirante's executive officer on her first patrol, modeled his first novel, Run Silent, Run Deep (1955), on his wartime experiences.

== Awards ==
George L. Street III received the following medals and decorations

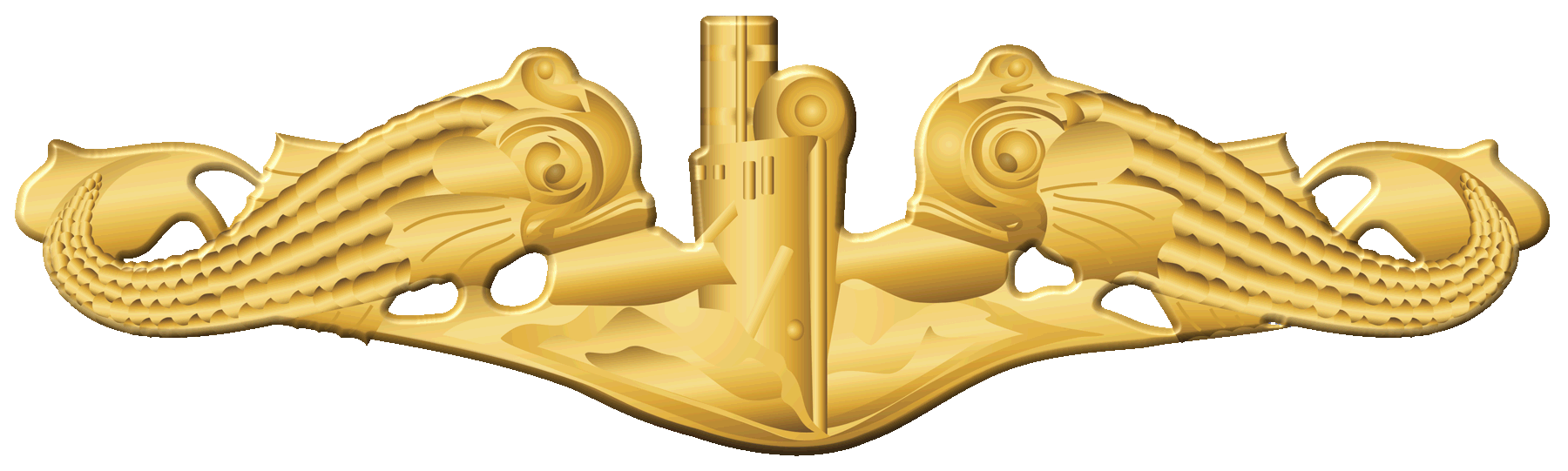

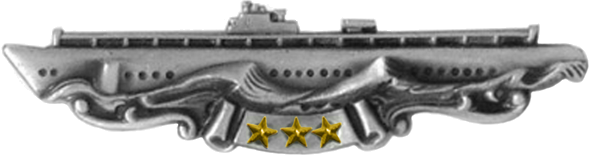

Badge	Submarine Warfare Insignia		
1st row	Medal of Honor		Navy Cross
2nd row	Silver Star with 5/16 inch star	Combat Action Ribbon Retroactively Awarded, 1999	Navy Presidential Unit Citation with 1 Service star
3rd row	American Defense Service Medal with 'Fleet' clasp	American Campaign Medal	Asiatic-Pacific Campaign Medal with 12 Campaign stars
4th row	World War II Victory Medal	National Defense Service Medal with 1 Service star	Armed Forces Expeditionary Medal
Badge	Submarine Combat Patrol Insignia		

== See also ==
- List of Medal of Honor recipients
