= TCG Preveze =

TCG Preveze is the name of the following submarines of the Turkish Navy:

- TCG Preveze (S 340), ex-USS Guitarro (SS-363), a Gato-class submarine acquired in 1954 and decommissioned in 1972
- TCG Preveze (S 345), ex-USS Entemedor, a Balao-class submarine acquired in 1972 and stricken in 1987
- TCG Preveze (S 353), lead Preveze-class submarine (a subtype of the Type 209 submarines), commissioned in 1994

== See also ==
- Preveze
