= Japanese minesweeper W-26 =

History

Japan
- Name: W-26
- Builder: Mitsubishi shipyard, Yokohama
- Laid down: 1942
- Launched: 1942
- Completed: 31 March 1943
- Stricken: 30 April 1944
- Fate: Sunk, 17 February 1944

General characteristics
- Class & type: No.19 class minesweeper
- Displacement: 648 long tons (658 t) standard
- Length: 72.50 m (237 ft 10 in) o/a
- Beam: 7.85 m (25 ft 9 in)
- Draught: 2.61 m (8 ft 7 in)
- Propulsion: 2 × Kampon geared turbines, 3,850 shp (2,871 kW); 2 × Kampon mix-fired boilers; 2 shafts
- Speed: 20 knots (37 km/h; 23 mph)
- Range: 2,000 nmi (3,700 km; 2,300 mi) at 14 kn (26 km/h; 16 mph)
- Complement: 98
- Armament: 3 × 120 mm (4.7 in) L/45 naval guns; 2 × 25 mm AA guns; 36 × depth charges; 1 × Type 94 depth charge projector; 6 × paravanes

W-26 was a W-19-class minesweeper operated by the Imperial Japanese Navy during World War II.

== Design ==
The ship was ordered in August 1941 under the Rapid Naval Armaments Supplement Programme. Built by Mitsubishi Yards in Yokohama, the ship was laid down in 1942, launched in late 1942, and completed on 31 March 1943.

== Operational career ==
On 2 November, W-26 was damaged by bombs, while at Rabaul, New Britain, and beached to prevent her loss. She was repaired and refloated and departed Rabaul for Truk on 23 November. W-26 underwent further repairs in December at Rabaul, tied up alongside Hakkai Maru. While anchored in Karavia Bay, near Rabaul on 17 February 1944, she was attacked by SBD dive-bombers and TBF torpedo-bombers of the United States Navy. Sunk in the attack were W-26, Iwate Maru, and guard boat Funku Maru No. 2. She was removed from the Navy List on 30 April 1944.

Her wreck was partially salvaged by Nanyo Boeki Kaisha in 1958.
