= Japanese escort ship Awaji =

Mikura-class escort ship of the Imperial Japanese Navy

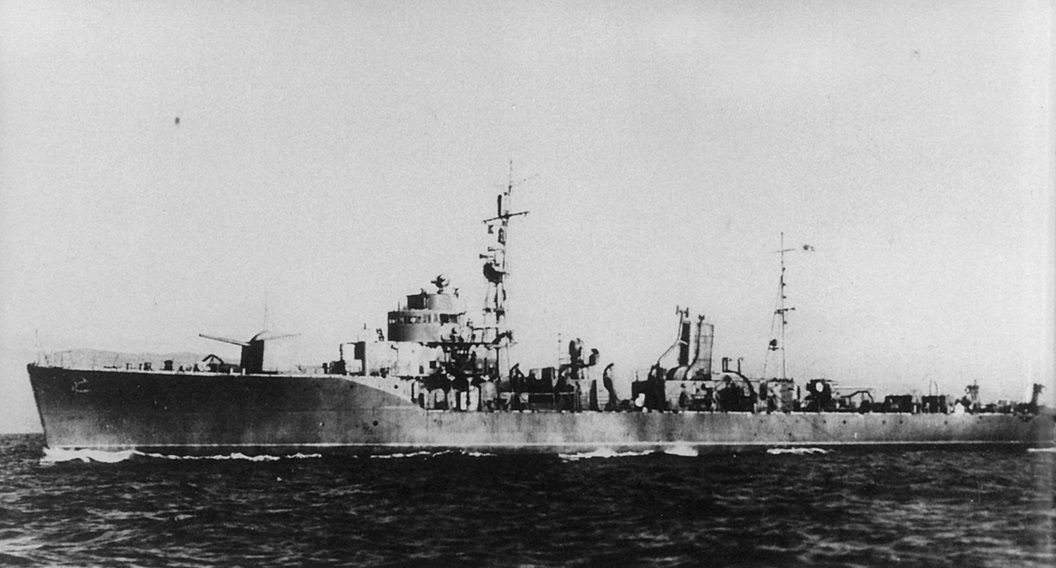
- Awaji in 1944

History

Japan
- Name: Awaji; (あわじ)
- Namesake: Awaji Island
- Builder: Hitachi, Sakurajima
- Laid down: 1 June 1943
- Launched: 30 October 1943
- Commissioned: 25 January 1944
- Identification: Pennant number: 324
- Fate: Sunk by USS Guitarro, 2 June 1944

General characteristics
- Class & type: Mikura class escort ship
- Displacement: 940 long tons (955 t) standard
- Length: 77.7 m (255 ft)
- Beam: 9.1 m (29 ft 10 in)
- Draught: 3.05 m (10 ft)
- Propulsion: 2 shaft, geared diesel engines, 4,400 hp (3,281 kW)
- Speed: 19.5 knots (36.1 km/h; 22.4 mph)
- Range: 5,000 nmi (9,300 km; 5,800 mi) at 16 kn (30 km/h; 18 mph)
- Complement: 150
- Armament: As built : 3 × 120 mm (4.7 in)/45 cal DP guns; 4 × Type 96 25 mm (0.98 in) AA machine guns (2×2); 6 × depth charge throwers; 120 × depth charges; From 1944 : 3 × 120 mm (4.7 in)/45 cal DP guns; 14-18 × 25 mm (0.98 in) AA machine guns; 6 × depth charge throwers; 120 × depth charges; 1 × 81 mm (3.2 in) mortar

Awaji (淡路) was a Mikura-class escort ship of Imperial Japanese Navy.

== Construction and career ==
She was laid down on 1 June 1943 and launched on 30 October 1943 by the Hitachi Zosen Corporation Sakurajima Shipyard. She was commissioned on 25 January 1944.

On March 24, Awaji, the 19th submarine chaser, and the special gunship Beijing Maru departed Kaohsiung to escort the Tasa-31 fleet (16 ships). She arrived in Vietnam on April 1, but separated from the Tasa-31 fleet due to a failure of her main engine. On the night of April 4, Awaji left Sanjak on a single ship and moved to Singapore. She arrives in Singapore on the afternoon of the 7th. From the 8th to the 27th, she was engaged in the repair of the main machine at the 101st Navy Engineering Department in Singapore. She leaves Singapore at 10 am on the 27th to join the Simi 01 fleet. She joined the Simi 01 fleet on the 28th and arrived in Miri, Borneo on the morning of the 30th. On May 4, she escorted the Mi-02 fleet (17 participating vessels) and departed Miri. Around 8 am on May 6, Nisshin Maru sank after a torpedo attack by USS Crevalle. The Mi-02 fleet unit arrives in Manila on May 10 and departs on May 13. They reached the coast of Mutsure Island in Kitakyushu on the 23rd via Kaohsiung. Awaji moves to Sasebo, and from the following 24th she will be engaged in the installation work of the detector recorder at the Sasebo Naval Arsenal.

In late May, Awaji was to escort the Hi-65 fleet to Singapore. The 7th Convoy Command (Commander Maj. Gen. Mitsuharu Matsuyama, Chief of Staff Colonel Ugaki) took command of the Hi-65 Convoy, and Maj. Gen. Matsuyama raised the flag aboard Kashii. 10 ships, including Shinshu Maru, were escorted by, Taiyo-class aircraft carrier Kaiyo, and escort vessels (Awaji, Chiburi, No. 19 Kaibokan, Submarine Chaser No. 60, and Tsubame). On May 29, the Hi-65 fleet departed from Moji. After sunset on June 1, the Hi-65 fleet was sailing off the eastern coast of Taiwan, as visibility deteriorated due to rain. After 2:00 am on June 2, USS Guitarro fired 6 torpedoes at the tanker, and Awaji, who discovered the torpedo, reported the discovery of the torpedo to the fleet flagship (Kashii). In addition, a depth charge aboard Awaji exploded underwater, causing the Hi-65 fleet to mess up and disperse. In addition to 76 crew members including Major Kozo Niki were killed, 5 were rescued by the No. 19 Kaibokan, and several were rescued by Chishin, but some died later on.

On July 10, Awaji was removed from the Imperial Kaibokan.
