= USS Tirante =

Submarine of the United States

Coordinates: 31°11′N 130°04′E

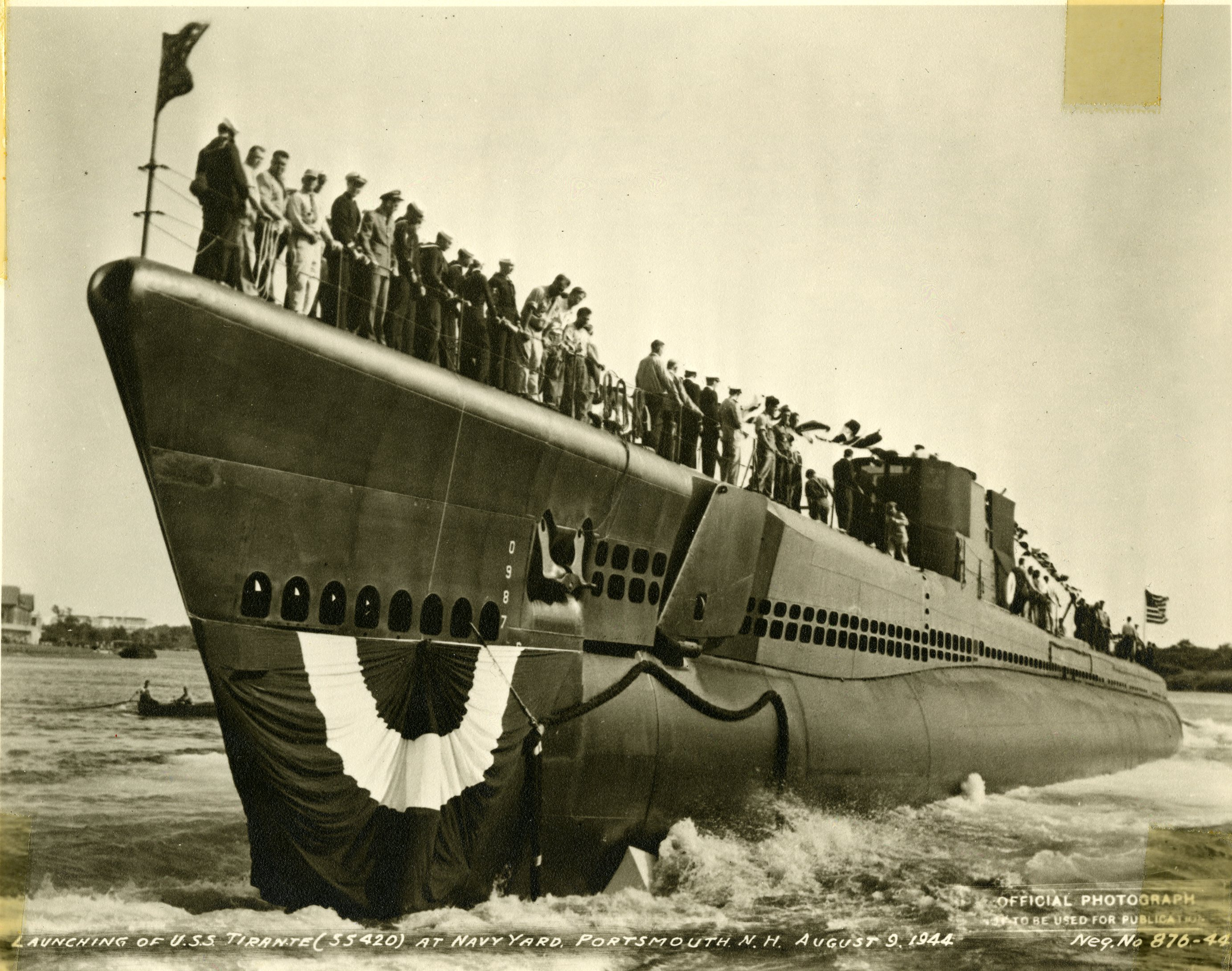
- Tirante (SS-420) at her launch from Portsmouth Naval Shipyard.

History

United States
- Name: USS Tirante
- Builder: Portsmouth Naval Shipyard, Kittery, Maine
- Laid down: 28 April 1944
- Launched: 9 August 1944
- Commissioned: 6 November 1944
- Decommissioned: 20 July 1946
- Recommissioned: 26 November 1952
- Decommissioned: 1 October 1973
- Stricken: 1 October 1973
- Fate: Sold for scrap, 21 March 1974

General characteristics As completed
- Class & type: Tench-class diesel-electric submarine
- Displacement: 1,570 long tons (1,600 t) surfaced; 2,416 long tons (2,455 t) submerged
- Length: 311 ft 8 in (95.00 m)
- Beam: 27 ft 4 in (8.33 m)
- Draft: 17 ft 0 in (5.18 m) maximum
- Propulsion: 4 × Fairbanks-Morse Model 38D8-⅛ 10-cylinder opposed piston diesel engines driving electrical generators; 2 × 126-cell Sargo batteries; 2 × low-speed direct-drive General Electric electric motors; two propellers; 5,400 shp (4.0 MW) surfaced; 2,740 shp (2.0 MW) submerged
- Speed: 20.25 knots (38 km/h) surfaced; 8.75 knots (16 km/h) submerged
- Range: 11,000 nautical miles (20,000 km) surfaced at 10 knots (19 km/h)
- Endurance: 48 hours at 2 knots (3.7 km/h) submerged; 75 days on patrol
- Test depth: 400 ft (120 m)
- Complement: 10 officers, 71 enlisted
- Armament: 10 × 21-inch (533 mm) torpedo tubes; (6 forward, 4 aft); 28 torpedoes; 1 × 5-inch (127 mm) / 25 caliber deck gun; Bofors 40 mm and Oerlikon 20 mm cannon

General characteristics (Guppy IIA)
- Displacement: 1,848 tons (1,878 t) surfaced; 2,440 tons (2,479 t) submerged
- Length: 307 ft (94 m)
- Beam: 27 ft 4 in (8.33 m)
- Draft: 17 ft (5.2 m)
- Propulsion: Snorkel added; One diesel engine and generator removed; Batteries upgraded to Sargo II
- Speed: Surfaced: 17.0 knots (31.5 km/h) maximum; 13.5 knots (25.0 km/h) cruising; Submerged: 14.1 knots (26.1 km/h) for ½ hour; 8.0 knots (14.8 km/h) snorkeling; 3.0 knots (5.6 km/h) cruising
- Armament: 10 × 21 inch (533 mm) torpedo tubes; (six forward, four aft); all guns removed

USS Tirante (hull number SS-420), a Tench-class submarine, was the second ship of the United States Navy to be named for the tirante, a silvery, elongated "cutlass fish" found in waters off Cuba. Her keel was laid down on 28 April 1944 by the Portsmouth Navy Yard of Kittery, Maine. She was launched on 9 August 1944 sponsored by Mrs. Ruth Maynard Sieglaff, wife of Commander William B. Sieglaff (prospective commander of PCU Tench), and commissioned on 6 November 1944 with Lieutenant Commander George L. Street III in command.

== First war patrol ==
Following shakedown training in Long Island Sound, and the waters off Panama and Oahu, Tirante departed Pearl Harbor for Japan on 3 March 1945. The submarine patrolled the approaches to Nagasaki. There she sank the 703-ton tanker Fuji Maru on 25 March and followed with the sinking of the 1218-ton freighter Nase Maru three days later. After the latter attack, Japanese escorts kept Tirante down for seven hours, before she slipped away unscathed.

On 31 March, Tirante shelled and sank a 70-ton lugger with five-inch (127 mm) and 40-millimeter gunfire and, on 1 April, missed an LST-type vessel with a spread of three torpedoes. The submarine soon shifted to waters off the south coast of Korea, near the Strait of Tsushima. At twilight on 6 April, she battle-surfaced and captured a small Japanese fishing vessel and took its three crewmen prisoner before sinking it.

The following day, Tirante torpedoed a 2800-ton cargo freighter loaded with a deck cargo of oil drums. The submarine surfaced and directed a nearby Korean fishing craft to pick up two survivors. Although observers on the submarine reported witnessing the Maru's sinking, post-war examination of Japanese records failed to confirm it.

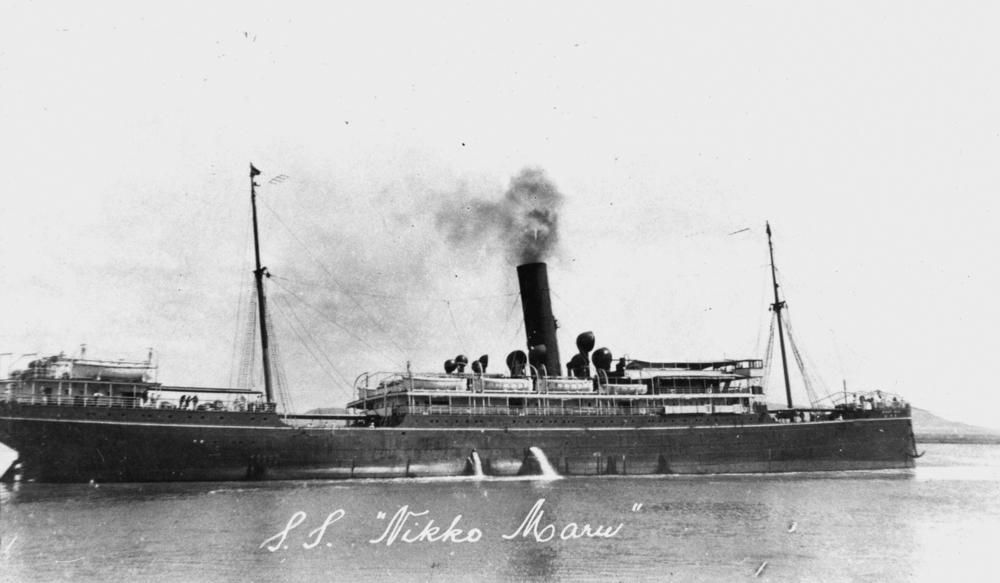
In April 1945 Tirante sank the troopship Nikko Maru, killing 668 people

US naval intelligence had broken the Japanese codes and was able to anticipate their movements. One intercepted message told of an important convoy steaming toward the Tirante's area. In response to this information, the submarine laid an ambush on 9 April. Picking out two targets, she launched three torpedoes at each. One spread missed, but the other struck the 5,058-ton troopship Nikkō Maru, carrying homeward-bound Japanese soldiers and sailors from Shanghai. As Nikko Maru sank, enemy escorts went on the offensive. To ward off the counterattack, Tirante fired a "cutie" (Mark 27 homing torpedo) at one of the escorts. Tirante heard an explosion, "breaking-up noises", and even screams. Again, post-war accounting failed to confirm the sinking.

Tirante resumed her patrol of the Yellow Sea between Quelpart Island (Cheju Do) and the mouth of the Yangtze River. She soon received an intelligence report informing her that an important Japanese transport was at Cheju, the main port on Quelpart Island. Under cover of darkness, Tirante approach her on the surface. In spite of possible enemy radar or patrolling planes or ships, she closed the coast and penetrated the mine- and shoal-obstructed waters within the ten-fathom curve line. Tirante then entered the harbor where she found three targets: two escort vessels and the 4000-ton Juzan Maru.

The submarine launched three torpedoes at the Maru. The explosion illuminated Tirante and alerted the Mikura-class escort vessel Nomi and Type C escort ship CD-31 which immediately got underway toward the submersible. As she headed back out to sea at flank speed, Tirante launched a spread of torpedoes that hit and destroyed both pursuers. En route to Midway Island, she captured two Japanese airmen (bringing her prisoner total to five) and concluded her first war patrol on 26 April.

Tirante's performance earned Commander Street the Medal of Honor. Lieutenant Edward L. Beach, the executive officer—and later commander of Triton (SSRN-586) during the submarine's submerged circumnavigation of the globe—received the Navy Cross. The ship, was awarded the Presidential Unit Citation. Lieutenant Endicott Peabody, a future governor of Massachusetts who served as the torpedo data computer operator, received the Silver Star.

== Second and third war patrols ==
Tirante departed from Midway Island on 20 May as command ship of the nine-boat "wolfpack" dubbed "Street's Sweepers". They patrolled the Yellow Sea and East China Sea on the lookout for enemy targets—by then dwindling in number. Tirante located a four-ship convoy on 11 June, in the familiar waters off Nagasaki. She evaded the three escorts long enough to get a shot at an 800-ton cargo freighter and pressed home a successful attack. Post-war Japanese records, though, did not confirm the hit.

The next day, Tirante pulled off a repeat performance of her hit-and-run raid at Cheju. She crept into Ha Shima harbor, some seven miles (11 km) from Nagasaki and picked out the 2200-ton Hakuju Maru moored alongside a colliery. From a range of 1,000 yards (900 m), the submarine fired at the cargoman which exploded. The second "fish" failed to detonate, but the third completed the destruction. As shells from shore guns fell, Tirante bent on speed and cleared the area.

Resuming her patrols, Tirante and her sisters played havoc with shipping between Korea and Japan, destroying junks carrying supplies from Korea to the Japanese home islands. Boarding parties from the submarine would take off the captains for questioning, put the crew in life boats, and set fire to the craft. Tirante captured a dozen in this manner and destroyed two heavily armed picket boats with surface gunfire before returning to Guam on 19 July.

Tirante departed Guam on 12 August on what would have been her third war patrol. The end of the war, however, ended the operation and the submarine put into Midway Island on 23 August. Eventually sailing for the east coast of the United States, Tirante moored at the Washington Navy Yard in October, at which time Commander Street received his Medal of Honor in a White House ceremony. Shifting to Staten Island, New York, on 31 October, the submarine remained there until moving to New London, Connecticut, on 8 January 1946. After conducting training operations out of New London, Connecticut, Tirante was decommissioned and placed in reserve on 6 July 1946 at her home port.

== Post World War II and fate ==
Subsequently converted to greater underwater propulsive power (GUPPY IIA) configuration, Tirante was recommissioned on 26 November 1952, at the Portsmouth Naval Shipyard. After conducting her shakedown to Bermuda and operating in the Atlantic as far north as Iceland, the submarine returned to the east coast of the United States to prepare for her first deployment with the Sixth Fleet.

In the ensuing two decades, Tirante conducted six more Mediterranean Sea deployments, interspersed with a regular schedule of exercises and maneuvers with Fleet units in the North Atlantic, off the east coast and in the Caribbean Sea and the Gulf of Mexico. The ship participated in joint exercises with NATO forces; sometimes served as a target for antisubmarine warfare exercises; and, on occasion, assisted the Fleet Sonar School at Key West, Florida, in the development of ASW tactics and weapons.

Decommissioned at Key West, Florida, on 1 October 1973, and struck from the Naval Vessel Register the same day, Tirante was sold on 11 April 1974 to Union Minerals and Alloys Corporation of New York, for scrapping.

Tirante received two battle stars and a Presidential Unit Citation for her World War II service.

The Tirante is the subject of an episode of the syndicated television anthology series, The Silent Service, which aired during the 1957–1958 season.

== Notable crewmen ==
- George L. Street III, Medal of Honor recipient and skipper
- Edward L. Beach, Jr., author
- Theo Marcuse, actor
- Endicott Peabody, governor of Massachusetts
