= Japanese escort ship Nōmi =

Mikura-class escort ship of the Imperial Japanese Navy

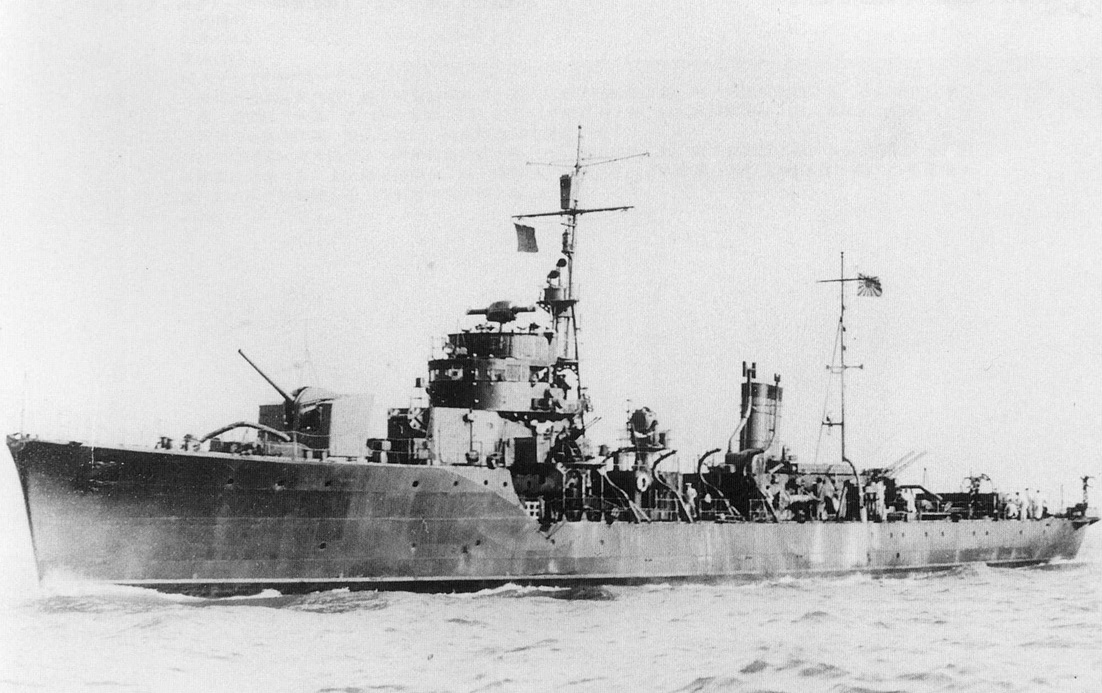
- Nōmi in 1944

History

Japan
- Name: Nōmi; (のうみ)
- Namesake: Nōmi Island
- Builder: Hitachi, Sakurajima
- Laid down: 10 August 1943
- Launched: 3 December 1943
- Commissioned: 28 January 1944
- Identification: Pennant number: 326
- Fate: Sunk, 14 April 1945

General characteristics
- Class & type: Mikura-class escort ship
- Displacement: 940 long tons (955 t) standard
- Length: 77.7 m (255 ft)
- Beam: 9.1 m (29 ft 10 in)
- Draught: 3.05 m (10 ft 0 in)
- Propulsion: 2 shaft, geared diesel engines, 4,400 hp (3,281 kW)
- Speed: 19.5 knots (36.1 km/h; 22.4 mph)
- Range: 5,000 nmi (9,300 km; 5,800 mi) at 16 kn (30 km/h; 18 mph)
- Complement: 150
- Armament: As built : 3 × 120 mm (4.7 in)/45 cal DP guns; 4 × Type 96 25 mm (0.98 in) AA machine guns (2×2); 6 × depth charge throwers; 120 × depth charges; From 1944 : 3 × 120 mm (4.7 in)/45 cal DP guns; 14-18 × 25 mm (0.98 in) AA machine guns; 6 × depth charge throwers; 120 × depth charges; 1 × 81 mm (3.2 in) mortar

Nōmi (能美) was a Mikura-class escort ship of the Imperial Japanese Navy.

== Construction and career ==
She was laid down on 1 June 1943 and launched on 30 October 1943 by the Hitachi Zosen Corporation Sakurajia Shipyard. She was commissioned on 25 January 1944.

=== 1944 ===
On June 23, Nōmi was released from the Yokosuka Naval District Operation Command and was removed from the Yokosuka Maritime Escort Flottila. On the 23rd of the same day, under the command of Operation Ominato Guard (Lt. Gen. Yasuo Inoue, Commander-in-Chief), she was transferred to the military division maritime escort unit. Belongs to the Soya Defense Force.

On the 27th, Nōmi arrived in Ominato, Aomori Prefecture. On the 28th, she was transferred to the Soya Defense Force (commander is Captain Tsuguo Chiba, commander of the Soya Defense Flotilla) along with the No. 15 submarine chaser. She arrives in Wakkanai, northern Hokkaido, on June 30. Since then, Nōmi has cooperated with the Northeast Area Fleet and engaged in convoy escort, patrol, and rescue in the Sakhalin, Kuril Islands, and Hokkaido areas. The 2nd Maritime Escort Flotilla, to which Nōmi belonged, was crushed in the Battle of Saipan because she had a headquarter on Saipan Island, and was dismissed on July 18.

On September 5, Nōmi and Namikaze escorted the Ki-505 fleet and departed from Otaru. On the night of the 8th, Namikaze was sunk by USS Seal, and her hull was cut off, making her inoperable. Nōmi was wary of the surroundings of the wave breeze and suppresses anti-submarine. The Ominato Guard Office dispatched destroyers such as Nokaze to rescue Namikaze and Kokugo Kaibo to escort the Ki-505 fleet. However, during this time, the Ki-505 fleet was unprotected. After that, Namikaze was towed by Kamikaze, and was escorted by destroyer Nokaze, Kaibokan Hachijo and Fukue (cooperating with escort from the middle) in Otaru.

The following morning, September 9, USS Seal raided the Ki-505 fleet, and the torpedoed the Shonan Maru sank. On the morning of the 10th, Nōmi passed the Shonan Maru, but she couldn't find any survivors. The 4 Ki-505 fleets, which had lost her escort, had been evacuated to Sakhalin Kaori, so Nōmi and Kunashiri moved there. Nōmi housed the survivors of the Shonan Maru, who had escaped on a large motorized boat. On the 15th, Nōmi and Kunigo continued to escort the Ki-505 fleet and set off Shiki. She arrived at Paramushir Island Kataoka Bay on the 22nd. On the 24th, she escorted the 403 fleet and left Kataoka Bay. Kunigo and Nōmi were divided by 18 of her passengers, 4 prisoners of war and 5 guards. The USS Searaven was operating in the same direction, and had already sunk the transport ship Riyama Maru.

On the morning of the 26th, the Wo-403 fleet, which was escorted by Kunigo and Nōmi, were dispersed due to thick fog at latitude 47 degrees 7 minutes north latitude 151 degrees 35 minutes east longitude. Nōmi searches for the missing fleet. From midnight on the 26th to early dawn on the 27th, Nōmi engaged with an enemy submarine at latitude 45 ° 44'N and longitude 148 ° 41'E, north of Etorofu Island, killing 7 people and injuring 16 seriously and lightly. She was hit by numerous bullets, and she was sent to Ominato for emergency repairs. She arrived in Otaru on the 29th. She departed Otaru on October 1 for a round trip to Ominato. She arrived at Ominato on the 2nd. She repaired in Ominato from the same day.

From December 4 to 11, maintenance and magnetic difference correction were carried out at the Sasebo Naval Arsenal. On the 10th during maintenance, the 1st Maritime Escort Flotilla was reorganized into the 1st Escort Flotilla (Commander-in-Chief, Fukuji Kishi). On the 12th, the Mota-28 Convoy (Nōmi, Miyake, No. 20 Kaibokan, No. 112, No. 138, and 2 other vessels, unknown participating vessels) departed from Sasebo. On the 22nd, the Mota-28 fleet unit arrived in Kaohsiung, Taiwan. On the 25th, the Hi-85 fleet unit (commander Maj. Gen. Shibuya Shibuya) arrived in Kaohsiung, and both fleets were reorganized. 26th 09:00, Tama-38 Fleet Unit (Miyake, Nōmi, No. 20, No. 39, No. 112, No. 138, Shinshu Maru, Kibitsu Maru, Aobayama Maru, Hinata Maru) sortieed Kaohsiung. On the 29th, 1700, the Tama-38 fleet arrived at San Fernando, Luzon. The Aobayama Maru and the No. 20 Kaibokan sank in the anti-aircraft battle on the 30th, but the landing was generally successful.

=== 1945 ===
On February 4, 1945, she escorted S-fleet and left Saigon, and on the 5th, she was transferred to the 1st Escort Flotilla under the control of the 1st Escort Fleet. She arrived in Singapore on the 6th. She left Singapore on the 11th, escorting her 88F-fleet (2 ships). Along the way, she goes through Quinone Bay and Tourane, and the fleet calls at Hong Kong on the 24th to repair Nōmi. On the 26th, Nōmi's repairs were completed and the fleet departed from Hong Kong and arrived at Moji on March 8. She made a round trip to Kure on the same day and carried out repairs and maintenance, including weapons replacement, at the Kure Naval Arsenal. In the description of "The 1st Escort Flotilla (Kaibokan Noumi) War Diary", the Type 94 Depth Charge Projector was removed during the repair in Kure to make it a Type 3 Depth Charge Projector, and the underwater probe was tentatively called the Type 3 Depth Charge Projector. It is said that it was replaced with Kai II and equipped with No. 1 radio wave detector type 3 Kaiichi.

It was designated as the flagship of the 1st Escort Flotilla on March 20, under repair in Kure, and was boarded by Captain Akira Ikeda, Commander of the Sea Defense Corps. She was repaired on April 2 and she was docked. She maintained and commissioned until the 8th, and on the 9th she was circulated to Moji. On the 11th, the escort group (Nōmi, Miyake, No. 31 Kaibokan) escorted the Moshi-02 fleet (special transport ship Toyama Maru, 3,943 tons, about 400 passengers) and departed from Moji. On the afternoon of the 13th, the Moshi-02 fleet unit arrived at the harbor on Jeju Island, and three escorts (Nōmi, Umi 31, Miyake) were to take turns on patrol. Before dawn on the 14th, the torpedo attack of USS Tirante that invaded the harbor caused a large explosion and sank the Toyama Maru. Nōmi pursued Tirante, but one of the two torpedoes fired by Tirante hit directly under Nōmi's bridge. Nōmi's ammunition detonated due to the explosion, and her hull was cut off and sank. About 130 crew members, including Colonel Ei Ikeda, commander of the 1st Escort Flotilla, and Major Saburo Agen, the captain of the Escort Corps, were killed in action. Tirante fired her last torpedo at her chased No. 31 Kaibokan. The torpedo she hit did not explode, but the impact triggered a depth charge on the No. 31 Kaibokan, which capsized and sank (39 killed in action). The only surviving Miyake, along with her supportive Kaibokan Aguni and No. 39 Kaibokan, carried out an anti-submarine sweep, but failed to capture Tirante.

On May 25, Nōmi was removed from the Imperial Japanese Navy.
