= Japanese escort ship Mikura =

Mikura-class escort ship of the Imperial Japanese Navy

Coordinates: 31.7500000°N 131.7500000°E

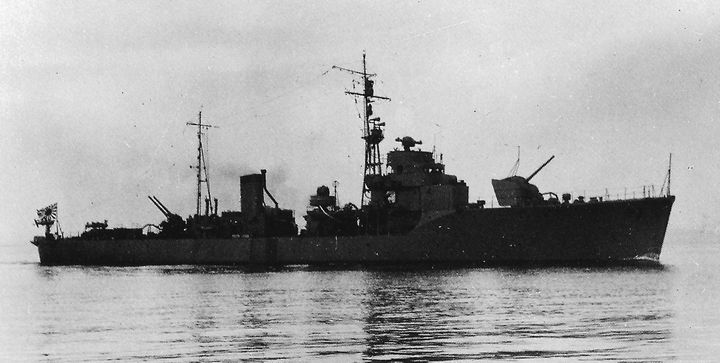
- Mikura in 1943

History

Japan
- Name: Mikura; (みくら)
- Namesake: Mikura-jima
- Builder: NKK, Tsurumi
- Laid down: 1 October 1942
- Launched: 16 July 1943
- Commissioned: 31 October 1943
- Identification: Pennant number: 320
- Fate: Sunk, 29 November 1944

General characteristics
- Class & type: Mikura-class escort ship
- Displacement: 940 long tons (955 t) standard
- Length: 77.7 m (255 ft)
- Beam: 9.1 m (29 ft 10 in)
- Draught: 3.05 m (10 ft)
- Propulsion: 2 shaft, geared diesel engines, 4,400 hp (3,281 kW)
- Speed: 19.5 knots (36.1 km/h; 22.4 mph)
- Range: 5,000 nmi (9,300 km; 5,800 mi) at 16 kn (30 km/h; 18 mph)
- Complement: 150
- Armament: As built : 3 × 120 mm (4.7 in)/45 cal DP guns; 4 × Type 96 25 mm (0.98 in) AA machine guns (2×2); 6 × depth charge throwers; 120 × depth charges; From 1944 : 3 × 120 mm (4.7 in)/45 cal DP guns; 14-18 × 25 mm (0.98 in) AA machine guns; 6 × depth charge throwers; 120 × depth charges; 1 × 81 mm (3.2 in) mortar

Mikura (御蔵) was the lead ship of the Mikura-class escort ships of the Imperial Japanese Navy.

== Construction and career ==
She was laid down on 1 October 1942 and launched on 31 October 1943 by the Nippon Kokan Tsurumi Shipyard. She was commissioned on 31 October 1943.

=== 1943 ===
On 14 November 1943, the 3114 convoy, consisting of Takebe Maru and Daido Maru, was escorted and departed Yokosuka sailing for Truk. On the 15th, the Second Maritime Escort Flotilla was subordinated to the Maritime Escort General Headquarters. They arrived on the 27th. On 5 December, she escorted the 4205 convoy, consisting of Akihayama Maru and Soyo Maru), with Hirado and departed from the truck for Yokosuka. On the 7th, Mikura aided the sinking Soyo Maru after the cargo ship had been struck torpedoes fired by USS Pogy. Mikura then escorted the Akihayama Maru and headed for Saipan. The convoy arrived at Saipan on the 10th. 4205 Oto Fleet added Satsuma Maru at Saipan and departed for Japan on the 12th. While sailing to Japan, the ship attacked a submarine target off the coast of Iwo Jima, but was damaged by contact with an escorted transport ship. The convoy arrived at Yokosuka on the 20th.

=== 1944 ===
From 4 January to 8 February 1944, Mikuma was docked at Nippon Kokan Asano Shipyard & Machinery Works. After leaving the dock, she made a round trip to Yokosuka. On 11 February, she escorted the fleet and departed from Yokosuka which arrived at Saipan on the 19th. Mikura departed Saipan on the 27th, escorting a fleet to Truk. On 5 March, they arrived at the anchorage. On 6 March, she departed Truk for Japan, calling at the relay station on Saipan on the 10th and arrived at Yokosuka on the 19th.

On 1 April, Mikura escorted the Higashimatsu No. 4 fleet and departed from Kisarazu. On the evening of the 9th, the ship once again entered Saipan, but re-sortied on the same night. On the 10th, the Higashimatsu No. 4 fleet was dismissed at Saipan and the ship returned to command of the 2nd Maritime Escort Flotilla, but the ship continued to escort the fleet to Truk. On the 12th, a depth charge attack against a target was carried out but the submarine escaped. The fleet arrived at Truk on the 15th. On the 22nd, Mikura departed for Japan. On the 26th, she called at the relay station Saipan and arrived at Yokosuka on 4 May. She then departed from Yokosuka on 15 May, escorting the fleet for Saipan / Palau. The escort ship called at the relay station Saipan on the 25th. After calling at the port, she engaged in anti-submarine alert off the coast of Saipan. On the 30th, the ship escorted the fleet to Palau and then departed from Saipan, arriving at Palau on 6 June.

On 12 June, she escorted the fleet and left Palau for Saipan, but the fleet changed its destination to Davao due to an air raid by American aircraft carrier-based aircraft on Saipan. The convoy arrived at Davao on the 18th. On the same day, transferred under the command of Operation 1st Maritime Escort Flotilla. On the 20th, escorted the fleet and head for the gusset. Returned to Davao on the 22nd. On the 30th, Mikura was dispatched as a single ship to join the Seda 01 fleet. Returned to Davao on 3 July.

Mikura departed from Davao on 6 July 1944, escorting the Dama 01 fleet to Manila. They arrived at Manila on the 13th. On the 15th, she escorted the Mi 08 fleet and left Manila, but due to a typhoon, the fleet returned to Manila. On the 17th, Mikura was dispatched to reinforce the Tama 21C fleet. On the 18th, she would be sent the reinforce the Hi-69 fleet. On the same day, the 2nd Maritime Escort Corps was disbanded and the ship was transferred to the 1st Maritime Escort Corps. The escort ship returned to Manila on the 20th. On the 23rd, she escorted the Hi-68 fleet and towards Japan from Manila. Mikura called at Kaohsiung on the 28th. 3 August, six consecutive arrivals.

Rounded to Sasebo on 4 August. Maintenance was carried out at the Sasebo Naval Arsenal from the 5th to the 7th. On the 8th, she had a temporary stay in Imari. On the 10th, she escorted the Hi-71 fleet and departed from Imari. On the 13th, the fleet called at Magong due to bad weather. On the 17th, she continued to escort the Hi-71 fleet and departed. On the 18th, the fleet suffered damage from a submarine attack and evacuated to San Fernando on the 19th. On the 20th, the ship set sail in San Fernando and engaged in anti-submarine sweeping in collaboration with the aircraft. Arrived in Manila on the 21st. On the 26th, she continued to escort the Hi-71 fleet and departed from Manila. Arrival in Singapore on 1 September.

On 6 September, she escorted the Hi-72 fleet and departed from Singapore. On the 12th, the fleet was attacked by a submarine and two transport ships, as well as the Shikinami and Hirado were sunk. The ship rescued the Shikinami crew after the depth charge attacks. On the 13th, the fleet once evacuated to Narabayashi, but the ship returned to the distress site for rescue. Returned to Narabayashi on the 14th. On the 16th, she escorted the first branch of the Hi-72 Fleet (Asaka Maru) and left for Sasebo. On the night of the 20th, the ship and the Asaka Maru was damaged by an attack by a US Army Air Corps aircraft while navigating the Taiwan Strait. Asaka Maru was escorted by the No. 10 Sea Defense Ship and headed for Magong, but the ship was unable to navigate due to one direct hit and several nearby bullets, and its whereabouts were unknown. On the 23rd, the ship was found in the middle of drifting from an airplane, and was escorted by the 18th Kaibokan to Iturup and made a round trip to Magong. From the 26th, the Magong Navy Engineering Department docked and carried out restoration and repair.

=== 1945 ===
On 6 March, an anti-submarine sweep was carried out with the No. 34 Kaibokan. On the 9th, in collaboration with the 33rd Kaibokan, rescue the 69th Kaibokan, which was damaged while escorting the Yumo 01 fleet and became inoperable. The No. 33 Kaibokan towed the No. 69 Kaibokan, and this ship was the escort for them. Operation AS1 ends on the 12th. On the 13th, the 102nd Squadron was transferred to the AS2 Operation Unit. On the 16th, the No. 69 Kaibokan sank due to wind waves, so the ships rescued the crew and made a round trip to Hong Kong. Operation AS2 ends on the 17th. On the 18th, the ship escorted the fleet (2 ships) and headed inland from Hong Kong. On the 19th, while sailing inland, the 102nd Squadron was transferred to the AS3 Operation Unit. Arrived at Moji on the 26th. On the 27th, the 2nd Fleet, the 1st Squadron, was training in Saeki to guard the 2nd Fleet, Oga, Meto, the 59th Kaibokan, the 65th Kaibokan, and 3 special minesweepers. Was organized as a third anti-submarine minesweeper. In addition, the ship and the 33rd Kaibokan, which had been returned to Monji from Hong Kong as support, and a special submarine chaser of the Saiki Defense Force were added, and an aircraft of the Saiki Air Corps equipped with a magnetic detector. Was also mobilized. The deployment point and patrol method were decided within the 27th. On the 27th, the main ship and the 33rd Kaibokan set sail for Moji, and on 28 March, the following day, four ships under Oga set sail for Saeki. The Third Anti-Submarine Squadron fixed the course to the south from the area beyond the Mizunokojima Lighthouse and started the search. Each ship of the 3rd Anti-Submarine Squadron took a single horizontal formation 4 nautical miles away from 3 nautical miles, with the 65th Kaibokan located on the westernmost side. At around 10:27 am, the aircraft detected the submarine, but soon lost sight of it. Nevertheless, from around midnight, the ship and the No. 33 Kaibokan merged, located 1,000 meters west of the No. 65 Kaibokan in a single line of battle, and rushed to the detection site with the No. 59 Kaibokan. As a result of a depth charge attack from around 13:00, two large eruptions rose. This point is recorded as 180 degrees 39.5 nautical miles in Tsurumisaki or 32 degrees 16 minutes north latitude 132 degrees 05 minutes east longitude. When re-observed on the morning of 29 March, the following day, a thick oil zone was flowing out from the attack point. The attack sank USS Trigger and the ship was allegedly involved in it.

Around the evening of the same day, the news was unknown in the south of Kyushu and she was found sunk. The 33rd Kaibokan, which she was with, was also sunk by an air raid. According to US records such as The Official Chronology of the US Navy in World War II, the ship was sunk by a torpedo attack by the USS Threadfin on the same day. At 16:45, the No. 33 Kaibokan discovered and reported an enemy aircraft, but Threadfin sank Mikura at this point according to American records. It is almost the same as the sinking point of the No. 33 Kaibokan described in The Official Chronology of the US Navy in World War II. In addition, Threadfin was sunk alone in Roscoe, and the 33rd Kaibokan was sunk by a USS Hornet aircraft. Kimata's "Enemy Submarine Attack" and "History of the Battle of the Sea of Japan", War Diary of the 1st Escort Fleet (1-31 March 1945), War Diary of the 102nd Squadron (1-31 March 1945) ) did not mention that it was sunk by Threadfin, but in the section of the escort ship of Kaibokan Senki, as a witness of the 65th Kaibokan voyage chief, "I was attacked by an enemy task force's plane and submarine, 1200 Around that time, Mikura was sunk by the torpedo attack of an enemy submarine, and there were no survivors." It is unclear in conclusion whether it was the Threadfin, the 58th Task Force, or the joint sink that really sank Mikura, but as mentioned above, at least Roscoe has recognized it as a joint battle result.

216 crew members under Major Ryusuke Oda, Captain of the Mikura Sea Defense, and 171 crew members under Major Masaharu Morimoto, Captain of the 33rd Sea Defense, were all killed in action, and there were no survivors.

On 25 May, Mikura was removed from the Imperial Kaibokan.
