= Japanese escort ship Etorofu =

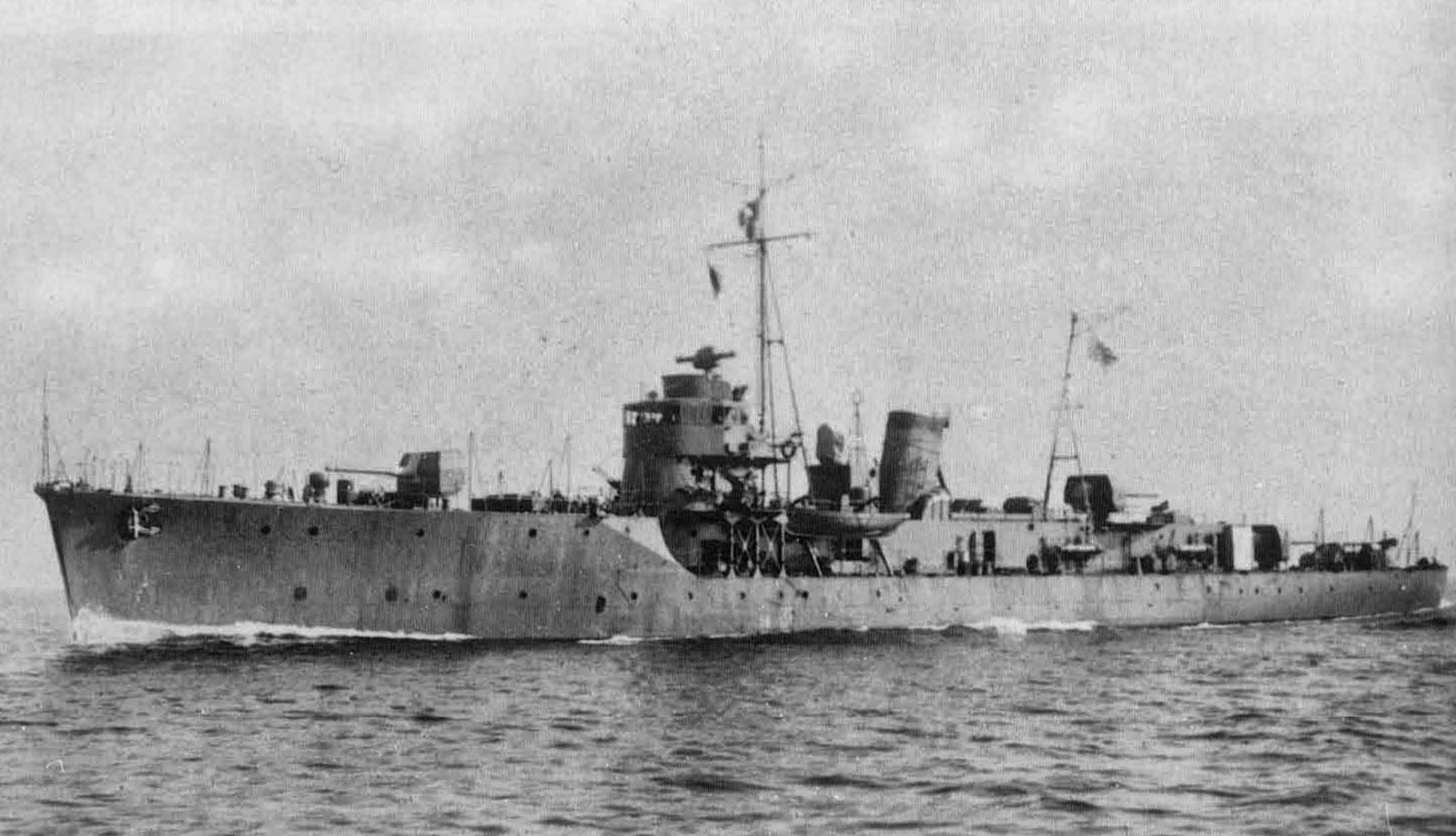
- Etorofu in 1943

History

Empire of Japan
- Name: Etorofu
- Namesake: Iturup island
- Builder: Hitachi, Sakurajima
- Laid down: 23 March 1942
- Launched: 29 January 1943
- Completed: 15 May 1943
- Stricken: 5 November 1945
- Fate: Broken up in 1947

General characteristics
- Class & type: Etorofu-class escort ship
- Displacement: 870 long tons (884 t)
- Length: 77.7 m (255 ft)
- Beam: 9.1 m (29 ft 10 in)
- Draught: 3.05 m (10 ft)
- Speed: 19.7 knots (22.7 mph; 36.5 km/h)
- Complement: 150
- Armament: 3 × 120 mm (4.7 in)/45 cal DP guns; Up to 15 × Type 96 25 mm (0.98 in) AA guns; 6 × depth charge throwers; Up to 60 × depth charges

Etorofu was the lead ship of her class of fourteen ships built for the Imperial Japanese Navy during World War II.

== Background and description ==
The Etorofu class was an improved version of the preceding Shimushu class with a greater emphasis on anti-submarine warfare. The ships measured 77.72 meters (255 ft 0 in) overall, with a beam of 9.1 meters (29 ft 10 in) and a draft of 3.05 meters (10 ft 0 in). They displaced 880 metric tons (870 long tons) at standard load and 1,040 metric tons (1,020 long tons) at deep load. The ships had two diesel engines, each driving one propeller shaft, which were rated at a total of 4,200 brake horsepower (3,100 kW) for a speed of 19.7 knots (36.5 km/h; 22.7 mph). The ships had a range of 8,000 nautical miles (15,000 km; 9,200 mi) at a speed of 16 knots (30 km/h; 18 mph).

The main armament of the Etorofu class consisted of three Type 3 120-millimeter (4.7 in) guns in single mounts, one superfiring pair aft and one mount forward of the superstructure. They were built with four Type 96 25-millimeter (1.0 in) anti-aircraft guns in two twin-gun mounts, but the total was increased to 15 guns by August 1943. 36 depth charges were stowed aboard initially, but this later increased by August 1943 to 60 depth charges with a Type 97 81-millimeter (3.2 in) trench mortar and six depth charge throwers. They received Type 22 and Type 13 radars and Type 93 sonar in 1943–44.

== Construction and career ==
Etorofu was launched by Hitachi, Sakurajima, on 29 January 1943 and completed on 25 March. She served on repatriation duties until 1947 when she was turned over to the United States Navy on 5 August and broken up at Kure beginning on 13 October.
