= Escorteur =

Warship protecting oceanic convoys

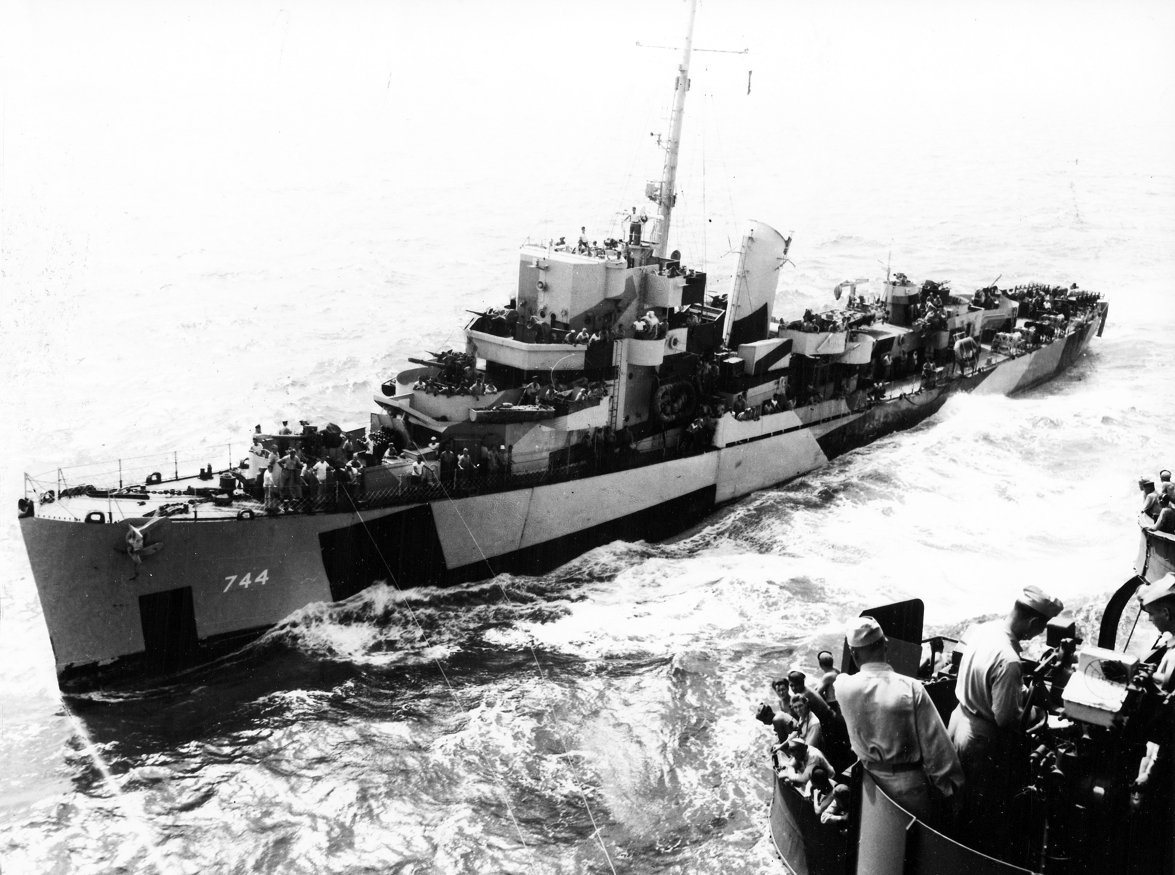
Destroyer escort USS Kyne (Cannon class)

The French term Escorteur (Escort Ship) appeared during the Second World War to designate a warship, of a medium or light displacement, whose mission was to protect ocean convoys and naval squadrons from attacks by submarines. This role was in general handled by a destroyer escort such as the Buckley and Cannon classes built in the United States, or a Hunt-class destroyer built by the United Kingdom, or even a River class built by the United Kingdom, Canada and Australia. The Imperial Japanese Navy used the designation kaibokan for this type of ship.

== The escorteurs of the French Navy ==
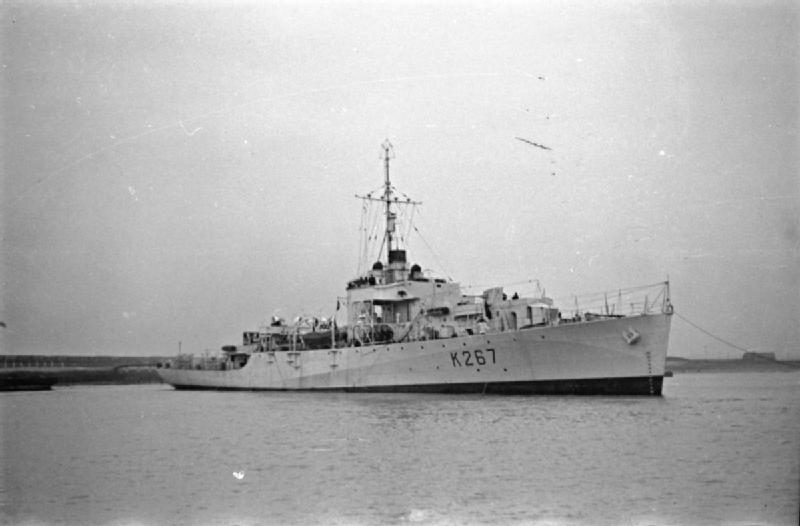
Frigate of the FNFL Escarmouche (River-class frigate)

In the immediate aftermath of the war, to fulfill the task of naval escorts, the French Navy was limited to a fleet of torpilleur and contre-torpilleur (otherwise known as destroyers), along with a number of avisos.

These ships were later joined by several naval ships of German and Italian origin awarded as war reparations, and several escort ships originated from the United Kingdom and the United States, all under different designations:

- Destroyer escort of 1,500 tons, constructed in the United States;
- Frigate of 1,200 tons, River-class frigate, constructed in the United Kingdom;
- Corvettes of 600 tons, Flower-class corvette, constructed in the United Kingdom;
- Coastal patrol boats of 400 tons, PC-461-class submarine chaser constructed in the United States.

Two ex-Italian light cruisers, Châteaurenault and Guichen, would bear their designation of escorteur d'escadre (Squadron Escorteur) from 1955 until their disarmament in 1962 and 1963.

== Construction of a new fleet ==
During the years 1950–1960, France reconstituted the navy with the assistance of the United States which contributed most of the rebuilding program. Following certain hesitations, the term escorteur was finally chosen for this new type of warship, instead of the traditional torpilleur or contre-torpilleur, which were abandoned.

== The four families of escorteurs ==
- 18 Squadron Escorteurs: 12 T 47 class , 5 T 53 class, 1 T 56 class: bâtiments of 3,000 tons, length 128 to 132 metres (420 to 433 ft), vocation anti-ship, anti-submarine, anti-aerial, picket radar flotilla navigation. They formed until the end of 1980s, the backbone forces of high-seas of the French Navy. For NATO, those were destroyers.
- 18 Rapid Escorteurs : Type E50 and Type E52; lighter bâtiments of 1,500 t, length 99 metres (325 ft), vocation anti-submarine, types E50, E52A, E52B. For NATO, those were frigates.
- 9 Aviso Escorteurs : Commandant Rivière class; bâtiments of 2,100 t, length 103 metres (338 ft), anti-submarine and anti-ship. For NATO, those were frigates.
- 14 Coastal Escorteurs : 3 Le Fougeux class and 11 L'Adroit class; bâtiments of 400 t, 52 metres (171 ft) length. For NATO, those were patrol boats and submarine chasers.
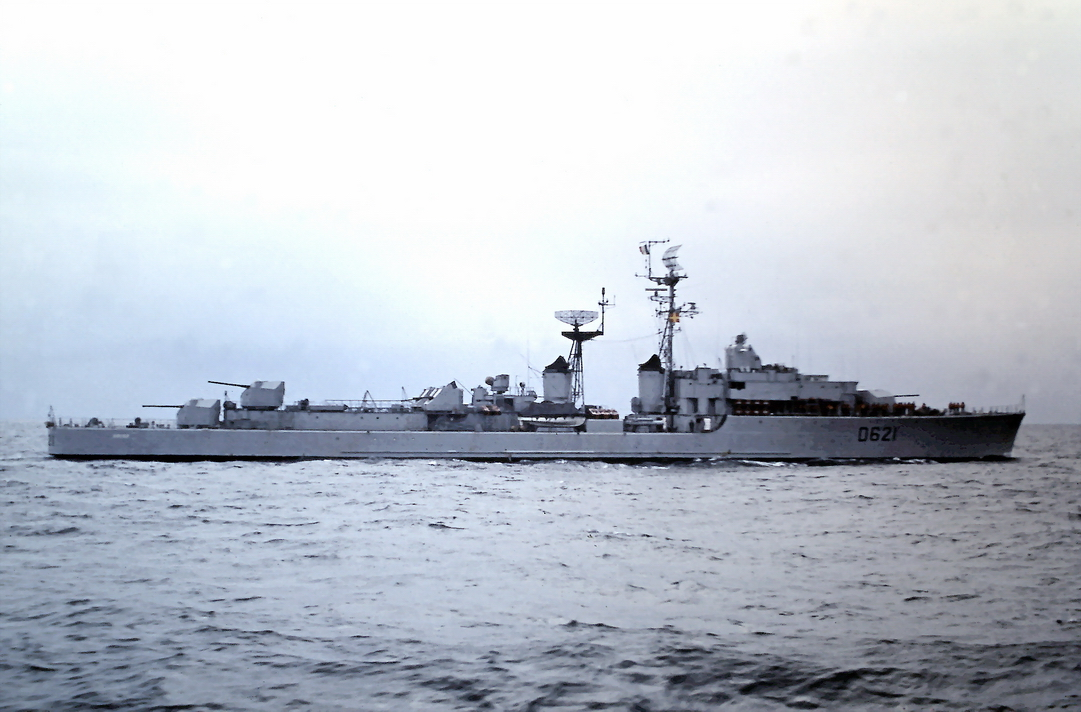
Squadron escorteur
Surcouf

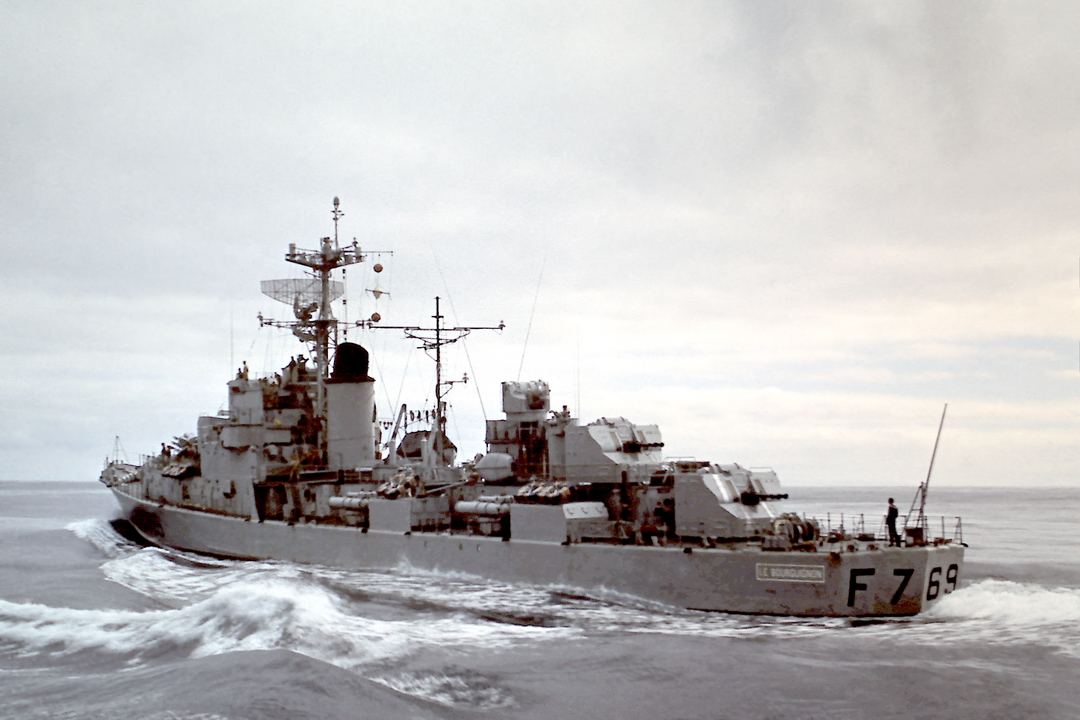
Rapid escorteur
Le Bourguignon

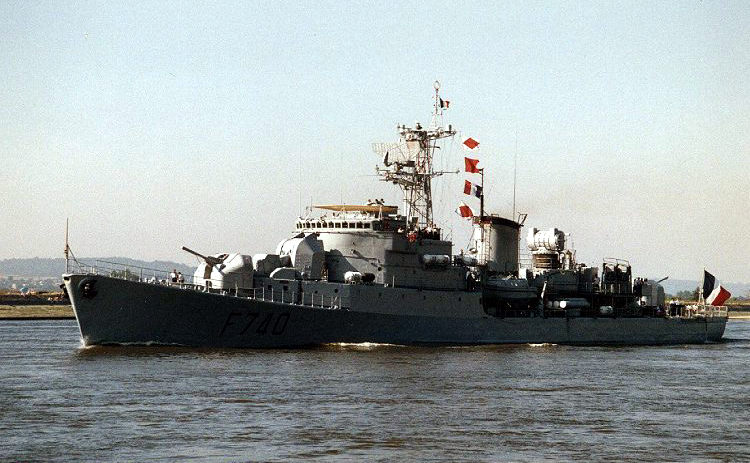
Aviso escorteur
Commandant Bourdais

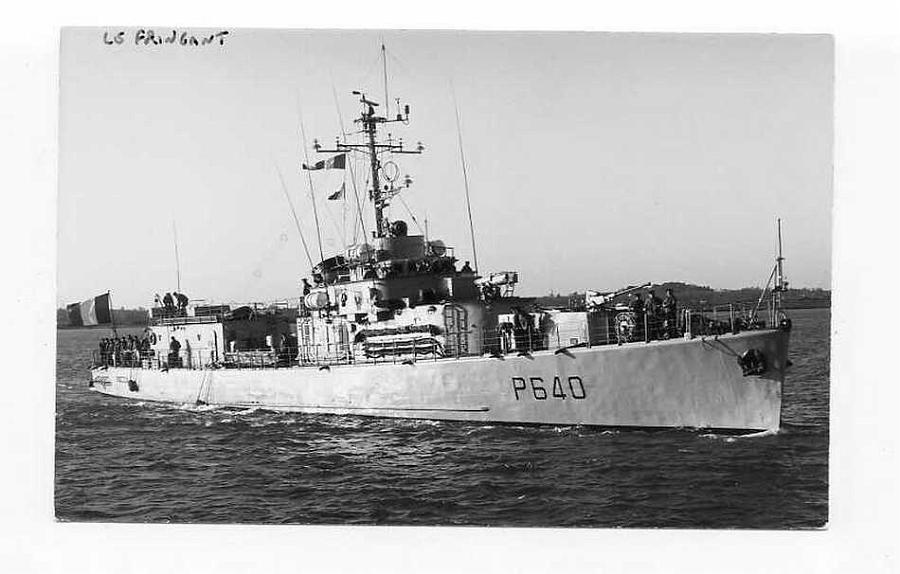
coastal escorteur
Le Fringant

The designation of « escorteur » is no longer used in the French Navy. The designation has been replaced by that of frigate, aviso or patrol boat.

== See also ==
- Fusiliers Marins
- List of active French Navy ships
- List of submarines of France
- List of ships of the line of France
- List of Escorteurs of the French Navy
