= List of lost United States submarines =

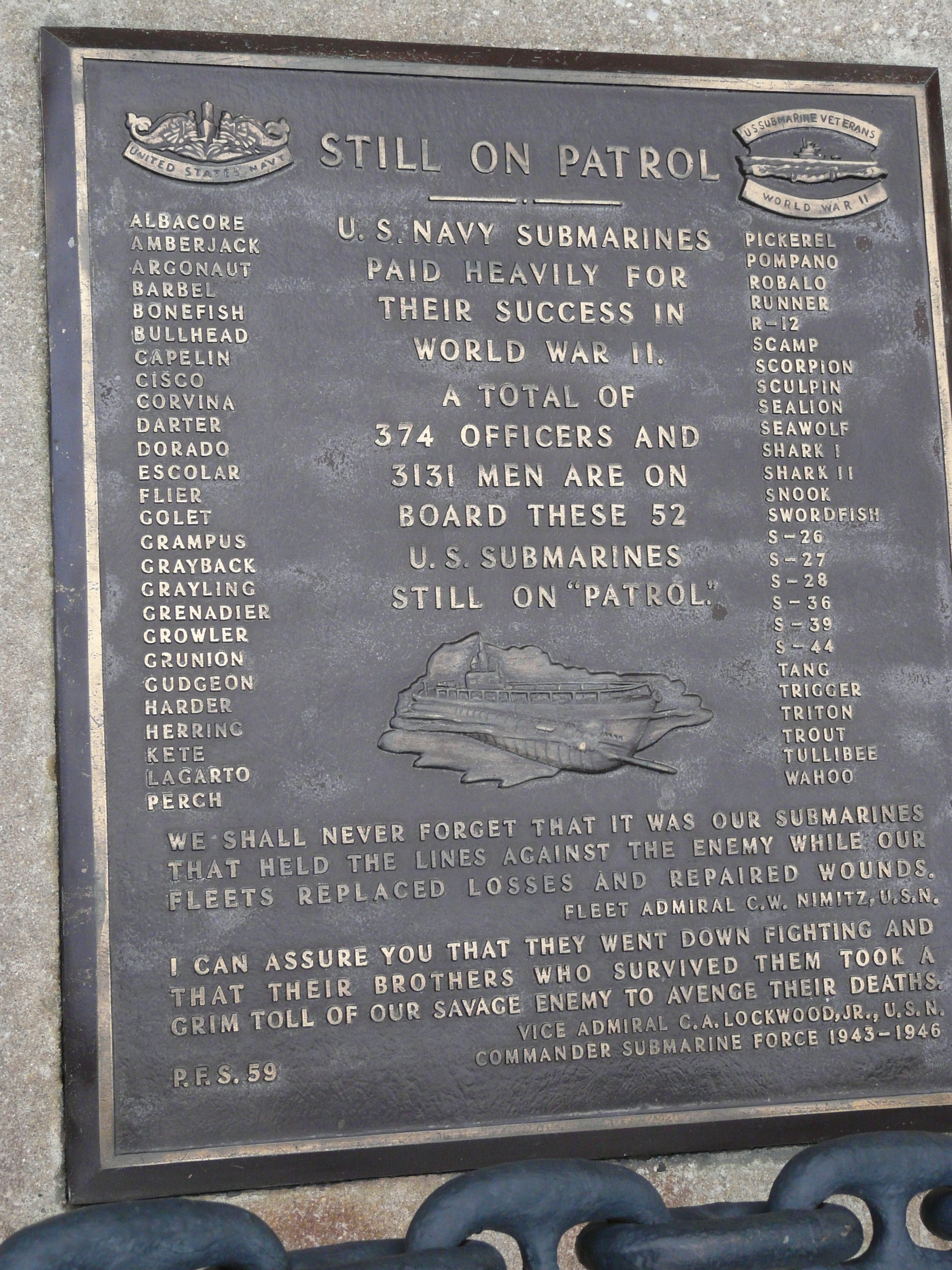
US Navy submarines "Still on Patrol" plaque at the Independence Seaport Museum, Philadelphia, Pennsylvania

These United States submarines were lost either to enemy action or to "storm or perils of the sea."

== Before World War II ==
Ship name	Hull number	Date of loss	Fate	Approximate location
Turtle	NA	October 1776	Tender vessel sunk by British	Fort Lee, New Jersey
Alligator	NA	2 April 1862	Broke loose from tow and foundered	Cape Hatteras, North Carolina
F-1	SS-20	17 December 1917	Lost in collision with F-3	San Diego, California
F-4	SS-23	25 March 1915	Foundered due to battery acid leak	Honolulu, Hawaii
H-1	SS-28	12 March 1920	Grounded	Magdalena Bay, Mexico
O-5	SS-66	28 October 1923	Collided with SS Abangarez	Bahía Limón, Panama
O-9	SS-70	20 June 1941	Foundered on test dive	Isles of Shoals, New Hampshire
S-4	SS-109	17 December 1927	Collided with Coast Guard destroyer Paulding; raised and recommissioned 16 October 1928	Provincetown, Massachusetts
S-5	SS-110	1 September 1920	Foundered on dive	Delaware Capes, New Jersey
S-51	SS-162	25 September 1925	Collided with SS City of Rome	Block Island, Rhode Island
Squalus	SS-192	23 May 1939	Foundered on test dive; raised and renamed Sailfish	Isles of Shoals, New Hampshire

Additionally:

- G-2, decommissioned as a target, flooded and sank unexpectedly 30 July 1919 in Two Tree Channel near Niantic, Connecticut with the loss of three crew.
- S-48 foundered 7 December 1921 in 80 feet (24 m) of water on a pre-commissioning dive. She was raised and commissioned 14 October 1922.
- R-8, decommissioned on 2 May 1931, she was berthed at Philadelphia until 26 February 1936 when she sank at her mooring. Later raised, she was struck from the Naval Vessel Register on 12 May 1936 and on 19 August she was used as a target vessel for an aerial bombing test.

== During World War II ==
=== American submarine losses ===
During World War II, the U.S. Navy's submarine service suffered one of the highest casualty percentage of all the American armed forces, losing one in five submariners. Some 16,000 submariners served during the war, of whom 375 officers and 3,131 enlisted men were killed, resulting in a total fatality rate of around 22%.

Fifty-two submarines of the United States Navy were lost during World War II, all but one, Dorado (SS-248), in the Pacific theater of operations. Two – Dorado (SS-248) and Seawolf (SS-197) – were lost to friendly fire (though there is speculation that the Dorado may have struck a German mine), at least three more – Tulibee, Tang, and Grunion – to defective torpedoes, and six to accident or grounding.

Another eight submarines went missing while on patrol and are presumed to have been sunk by Japanese mines, as there are no known Japanese anti-submarine attacks in their patrol areas. The other thirty-three lost submarines are known to have been sunk by the Japanese.

Ship name	Hull number	Date of loss	Fate	Approximate location
Albacore	SS-218	7 November 1944	Lost to enemy mine	Northeast of Hokkaido
Amberjack	SS-219	Missing after 14 February 1943	Possibly lost to enemy action by torpedo boat Hiyodori and submarine chaser No. 18	New Britain
Argonaut	SM-1	10 January 1943	Sunk by Japanese destroyers Isokaze and Maikaze	New Britain
Barbel	SS-316	4 February 1945	Lost to enemy air attack	Borneo
Bonefish	SS-223	19 June 1945	Lost to enemy action: depth-charged by kaibōkan Okinawa, CD-63, CD-75, CD-158, and CD-207	Sea of Japan
Bullhead	SS-332	6 August 1945	Lost to enemy air attack; last US submarine loss of the war	Java Sea
Capelin	SS-289	Missing after 2 December 1943	Fate unknown; possible naval mine or attack by minelayer Wakataka	Celebes Sea
Cisco	SS-290	28 September 1943	Lost to air attack and gunboat Karatsu (ex-USS Luzon)	Mindanao
Corvina	SS-226	16 November 1943	Torpedoed and sunk by Japanese submarine I-176	Truk
Darter	SS-227	24 October 1944	Accidental grounding in pursuit of Japanese cruiser Takao	Palawan Passage
Dorado	SS-248	Missing after 6 October 1943	Fate unknown; possibly sunk by friendly fire air attack (PBM Mariner of Patrol Squadron 210) or mines from German submarine U-214	Panama Canal Zone
Escolar	SS-294	Missing after 17 October 1944	Fate unknown; possibly naval mine or a Japanese escort destroyer	Yellow Sea
Flier	SS-250	12 August 1944	Lost to enemy mine	Balabac Strait, Philippines (7°58'43.21"N 117°15'23.79"E)
Golet	SS-361	14 June 1944	Lost to enemy action by escorts Miya Maru and Bunzan Maru	Northern Japanese waters
Grampus	SS-207	Missing after 11 February 1943	Fate unknown; possibly sunk by Japanese destroyers Minegumo and Murasame (or possibly to air attack by 958th Kōkūtai naval aircraft)	New Britain
Grayback	SS-208	27 February 1944	Lost to enemy air attack	Ryukyu Islands
Grayling	SS-209	Missing after 9 September 1943	Fate unknown; possibly rammed by transport Hokuan Maru	Lingayen Gulf, Philippines
Grenadier	SS-210	21 April 1943	Scuttled following enemy air attack	Strait of Malacca
Growler	SS-215	8 November 1944	Sunk by Japanese destroyer Shigure and escort ships Chiburi and CD-19	Philippines
Grunion	SS-216	30 July 1942	Sunk by circular run of own torpedo	Kiska Island, Alaska
Gudgeon	SS-211	Missing after 7 April 1944	Fate unknown; possibly air attack	Maug Islands or possibly Iwo Jima
Harder	SS-257	24 August 1944	Lost to enemy action by kaibokan CD-22	Dasol Bay, Philippines
Herring	SS-233	1 June 1944	Lost to enemy shore batteries	Kuril Islands
Kete	SS-369	Missing after 19 March 1945	Fate unknown; possibly sunk by mines	Ryukyu Islands
Lagarto	SS-371	3 May 1945	Lost to enemy action by Japanese minelayer Hatsutaka	Gulf of Thailand
Perch	SS-176	1-3 March 1942	Scuttled following enemy action by Japanese destroyers Amatsukaze, Hatsukaze, Ushio, and Sazanami	Java
Pickerel	SS-177	Missing after 18 March 1943	Fate unknown; possible enemy actions include one by minelayer Shirakami and auxiliary subchaser Bunzan Maru on 3 April 1943	Northern Honshu
Pompano	SS-181	Missing after 27 August 1943	Fate unknown; possibly naval mine or enemy action	Northern Honshu
R-12	SS-89	12 June 1943	Foundered on training exercise	off Key West, Florida
Robalo	SS-273	26 July 1944	Fate unknown; probably naval mine	West of Palawan Island
Runner	SS-275	Missing after 27 May 1943	Fate unknown; possibly naval mine	Hokkaido
S-26	SS-131	24 January 1942	Accidental collision with USS Sturdy (PC-460)	Gulf of Panama
S-27	SS-132	19 June 1942	Accidental grounding	Amchitka Island, Alaska
S-28	SS-133	4 July 1944	Foundered while submerged during anti-submarine exercise (reasons unknown)	Oahu, Hawaii
S-36	SS-141	20 January 1942	Accidental grounding	Makassar Strait
S-39	SS-144	14 August 1942	Accidental grounding	Rossel Island
S-44	SS-155	7 October 1943	Lost to enemy action by Japanese escort Ishigaki	Kurile Islands
Scamp	SS-277	11 November 1944	Lost to enemy action by kaibokan CD-4 and aircraft	Tokyo Bay
Scorpion	SS-278	Missing after 5 January 1944	Fate unknown; probably naval mine	East China Sea
Sculpin	SS-191	19 November 1943	Scuttled following enemy action by Japanese destroyer Yamagumo	Gilbert Islands
Sealion	SS-195	10 December 1941	Scuttled 25 December 1941 following irreparable damage in air attack 10 December	Cavite Navy Yard, Philippines
Seawolf	SS-197	4 October 1944	Probably sunk by "friendly fire" from USS Richard M. Rowell (DE-403)	Morotai Island
Shark	SS-174	Missing after 7 February 1942	Probably sunk by Japanese destroyer Yamakaze	Molucca Sea
Shark	SS-314	24 October 1944	Sunk by Japanese destroyer Harukaze	Luzon Strait
Snook	SS-279	Missing after 8 April 1945	Fate unknown; possibly sunk by Japanese escort ships Okinawa, CD-8, CD-32 and CD-52	South China Sea
Swordfish	SS-193	Missing after 3 January 1945	Fate unknown; possibly sunk by Japanese escort ship CD-4 or naval mine	Ryukyu Islands
Tang	SS-306	25 October 1944	Sunk by circular run of own torpedo	Formosa Strait
Trigger	SS-237	28 March 1945	Lost to enemy action by kaibokan Mikura, CD-33, and CD-59; assisted by air attack	Ryukyu Islands
Triton	SS-201	15 March 1943	Sunk by Japanese destroyers Samidare and Satsuki and submarine chasers CH-22 and CH-24	Admiralty Islands
Trout	SS-202	29 February 1944	Sunk by Japanese destroyer Asashimo	Okinawa
Tullibee	SS-284	26 March 1944	Sunk by circular run of own torpedo	Palau Islands
Wahoo	SS-238	11 October 1943	Lost to enemy air and surface attack by submarine chasers CH-15, CH-43 and 3 E13A1 Jakes	La Perouse Strait

=== Additional casualties ===
There are two additional casualties to submarines in World War II that are sometimes considered as effectively two additional losses.

USS Halibut was damaged by Japanese air and surface forces on 14 November 1944. She was able to reach Saipan and later Pearl Harbor on 1 December, departing San Francisco for Portsmouth Navy Yard on 16 February 1945. There it was determined that she was a constructive total loss and beyond economical repair, but might be useful as a school ship, similar to the postwar immobile pierside training submarines. However, her career in this capacity was brief, and Halibut was decommissioned at Portsmouth Navy Yard 18 July 1945 and sold for scrap in January 1947.

USS Lancetfish was commissioned on 12 February 1945 and sank at pier 8 at the Boston Navy Yard on 15 March 1945, apparently without loss of life and reportedly still incomplete. She was raised eight days later, decommissioned on 24 March 1945, and never completed or fully repaired. Postwar, she was listed as a Reserve Fleet submarine until stricken in 1958 and scrapped in 1959, having never gone to sea.

=== Additional incidents ===
The former USS R-19 was transferred to the Royal Navy 9 March 1942 and renamed as HMS P.514. On 21 June 1942 she was rammed by the Royal Canadian Navy minesweeper HMCS Georgian and sank with all hands after the submarine was mistaken for a German U-boat.

The former USS S-49 was sold in 1931 to a private owner for use as a tourist attraction, with the hulk reacquired by the U.S. Navy for "experimental purposes" in 1941. She foundered and sank in the Patuxent River 16 December 1942.

The former USS S-25 was transferred to the Royal Navy 4 November 1941 and renamed as RMS P.551 then transferred to the Polish Navy in exile and renamed ORP Jastrząb. On 2 May 1942 she was attacked in a friendly fire incident by a Royal Navy minesweeper and destroyer and sank with all hands.

USS R-1, originally commissioned on 16 December 1918 and decommissioned after more than 12 years of service, was recommissioned and served for five additional years during World War II. R-1 was decommissioned at Key West on 20 September 1945 and was struck from the Naval Vessel Register on 10 November. Still at Key West awaiting disposal on 21 February 1946, the submarine sank in 21 feet (6.4 m) of water. Raised three days later, she was sold for scrap on 13 March 1946.

USS S-37 was decommissioned on 6 February 1945, was stripped, and her hulk was supposed to be expended as a target for aerial bombing off San Diego, California, but she broke her tow cable and sank, coming to rest in some 50 to 60 feet (15 to 18 m) of water, on 20 February 1945. Her name was stricken from the Naval Vessel Register three days later. Salvagers unsuccessfully tried to retrieve the wreck of S-37 for her scrap value, but lost her again off Imperial Beach, California, in 20 to 30 feet (6.1 to 9.1 m) of water at 32°36.2541′N 117°08.2334′W, where she remains to this day.

== After World War II ==
Ship name	Hull number	Date of loss	Fate	Approximate location
Cochino	SS-345	26 August 1949	Lost to accidental fire and battery explosion	Norwegian Sea
Scorpion	SSN-589	Between 22 May and 5 June 1968	Cause unknown; numerous theories have been advanced. Recent deep submergence photography indicates the possibility of an implosion event similar to the USS Thresher.	North Atlantic Ocean, 400 nautical miles (740 km) southwest of the Azores
Stickleback	SS-415	20 May 1958	Collision with USS Silverstein	Oahu, Hawaii
Thresher	SSN-593	10 April 1963	Exact cause unknown; one theory is a seawater leak led to a reactor plant shutdown, compounded by a heavy trim (excess negative buoyancy) and an inadequate ballast tank blow system. Another theory is that a reactor plant scram occurred for tests; a flaw caused an inability to operate key reactor valves and other valves, which prevented emergency surfacing or a problem in the procedures for a scram caused the inability to operate a very important steam plant valve causing a loss of propulsion. Any of these problems could have caused the boat to sink beyond crush depth.	200 nautical miles (370 km) east of Cape Cod, Massachusetts

=== Additional incidents ===
USS Tarpon was decommissioned on 15 November 1945 and sold for scrap 8 June 1957. The Tarpon foundered in deep water, south of Cape Hatteras, North Carolina, on 26 August 1957, while under tow to the scrap yard.

USS Sargo was docked in Pearl Harbor on 14 June 1960, preparing to take Bhumibol Adulyadej and his wife Mom Rajawongse Sirikit Kitiyakara, the King and Queen of Thailand on a cruise the next day. Sargo was charging her oxygen tanks when the oxygen line, which entered the submarine through the stern torpedo room hatch, developed a leak and a fire ignited. Two Mark 37 torpedo warheads detonated "low-order", and the fire spread dramatically, killing the crewman tending the oxygen line, machinist's mate third class James E. Smallwood. The fire, fed by the pressurized oxygen, shot flames over 100 feet (30 m) in the air through the hatch. When the combined forces of the shipyard and the boat's crew were unable to control the fire, Sargo's officers took the submarine a short distance from the pier and submerged with the stern room hatch open. The fire was extinguished, and Sargo bottomed in the channel. A floating crane later raised the Sargo, which was towed to Pearl Harbor Naval Shipyard for repairs. Subsequent repairs took three months in drydock. Sargo was returned to active service in October 1960 and remained so until decommissioned and stricken from the Naval Vessel Register on 21 April 1988. James E. Smallwood MM3(SS), who sacrificed his life in the fire while taking action to save the ship was awarded, posthumously, the Navy and Marine Corps Medal for having "firmly and meticulously carried out the ship's safety precautions requiring isolation of the charging compartment from the remainder of the vessel. Aware of the potential danger involved, he kept the watertight door and bulkhead flappers shut." Other crew members were also awarded medals and letters of commendation for outstanding courage over and above the call of duty.

USS Guitarro flooded and sank pier-side prior to commissioning at Mare Island Naval Shipyard on 15 May 1969. Two shipyard teams, apparently unaware of each other's efforts, were conducting work involving filling tanks in both the forward and aft portions of the submarine. Eventually the lack of coordination led to flooding through the bow hatch. The submarine was raised, but completion was delayed 32 months. Guitarro was commissioned on 9 September 1972.

USS Bugara was decommissioned and struck from the Naval Register 1 October 1970. On 1 June 1971, while under tow near Cape Flattery, Washington state, Bugara swamped and sank accidentally.

USS Bonefish was not repaired after a fire near Florida on 24 April 1988 that killed three crewmembers. She was decommissioned 28 September 1988 and hulked 17 August 1989. The hull was later purchased by Northrop Grumman for testing.

USS Miami experienced a fire during overhaul at Portsmouth Naval Shipyard on 23 May 2012 that caused significant damage, though with no loss of life. A civilian shipyard worker confessed to arson. Although repairs were considered, using components from the decommissioned USS Memphis (SSN-691), the estimated cost of $700 million was considered uneconomical in a time of reduced budgets. Miami was decommissioned on 28 March 2014, to be disposed of via the nuclear Ship-Submarine Recycling Program.

== See also ==
- List of U.S. Navy losses in World War II
- Allied submarines in the Pacific War
- Submarines in the United States Navy
- List of submarines of the United States Navy
- List of most successful American submarines in World War II
