= Japanese escort ship CD-53 =

History

Imperial Japanese Navy
- Name: CD-53
- Builder: Nippon Kokan K.K., Tsurumi
- Laid down: 15 August 1944
- Launched: 29 October 1944:
- Completed: 28 November 1944
- Commissioned: 28 November 1944
- Stricken: 10 April 1945
- Fate: Torpedoed and sunk on 7 February 1945

General characteristics
- Class & type: Type C escort ship
- Displacement: 745 long tons (757 t) (standard)
- Length: 67.5 m (221 ft)
- Beam: 8.4 m (27 ft 7 in)
- Draught: 2.9 m (10 ft)
- Propulsion: Geared diesel engines; 1,900 hp (1,417 kW); 2 shafts
- Speed: 16.5 knots (30.6 km/h; 19.0 mph)
- Range: 6,500 nmi (12,000 km) at 14 kn (26 km/h; 16 mph)
- Complement: 136
- Sensors & processing systems: Type 22-Go radar; Type 93 sonar; Type 3 hydrophone
- Armament: As built : 2 × 120 mm (4.7 in)/45 cal DP guns; 6 × Type 96 Type 96 25 mm (0.98 in) AA machine guns (2×3); 12 × Type 3 depth charge throwers; 1 × depth charge chute; 120 × depth charges; From 1944 : as above, plus; 1 × 81 mm (3.2 in) mortar

CD-53 was a C Type class escort ship (Kaibōkan) of the Imperial Japanese Navy during the Second World War.

== History ==
CD-53 was laid down by Nippon Kokan K.K. at their Tsurumi shipyard on 15 August 1944, launched on 29 October 1944, and completed and commissioned on 28 November 1944. On 28 November 1944, she was assigned to the 1st Escort Fleet, Kure Guard Force, Kure Naval District with Haruo Yamagata (山縣春雄) as her commanding officer. On 5 February 1945, she was assigned to the Hainan Guard Office under the administration of the Imperial Japanese Army. During the war CD-53 was mostly busy on escort duties.

On 29 January 1945, she departed Moji-ku, Kitakyūshū for Singapore in convoy HI-93 serving as an escort along with CD-61, CD-63, and CD-207 for transport Kiyokawa Maru and oilers Toa Maru and Toho Marun. On 1 February 1945, the convoy reached Hainan Island; on 3 February 1945, the convoy reached Qui Sande Bay; and on 6 February 1945, the convoy reached Vân Phong Bay just north of Cam Ranh Bay. On 7 February 1945, the convoy left Van Phong Bay and at 1050, the American submarine Bergall fired two torpedoes at the convoy damaging the Toho Maru, and sinking CD-53 at (11°53′N 109°22′E). 159 of her crew were killed.

CD-53 was struck from the Navy List on 10 March 1945.

== Additional sources ==
- "Escort Vessels of the Imperial Japanese Navy special issue". Ships of the World (in Japanese). Vol. 45. Kaijinsha. February 1996.
- Model Art Extra No.340, Drawings of Imperial Japanese Naval Vessels Part-1 (in Japanese). Model Art Co. Ltd. October 1989.
- The Maru Special, Japanese Naval Vessels No.49, Japanese submarine chasers and patrol boats (in Japanese). Ushio Shobō. March 1981.
