= Japanese escort ship No.13 =

Imperial Japanese Navy ship

History

Imperial Japanese Navy
- Name: CD-13
- Builder: Nippon Kokan K. K.
- Laid down: 18 December 1943
- Launched: 9 February 1944
- Completed: 3 April 1944
- Commissioned: 3 April 1944
- Stricken: 15 September 1945
- Fate: Torpedoed and sunk, 14 August 1945

General characteristics
- Class & type: Type C escort ship
- Displacement: 745 long tons (757 t) (standard)
- Length: 67.5 m (221 ft)
- Beam: 8.4 m (27 ft 7 in)
- Draught: 2.9 m (10 ft)
- Propulsion: Geared diesel engines; 1,900 hp (1,417 kW); 2 shafts
- Speed: 16.5 knots (30.6 km/h; 19.0 mph)
- Range: 6,500 nmi (12,000 km) at 14 kn (26 km/h; 16 mph)
- Complement: 136
- Sensors & processing systems: Type 22-Go radar; Type 93 sonar; Type 3 hydrophone
- Armament: As built : 2 × 120 mm (4.7 in)/45 cal DP guns; 6 × Type 96 Type 96 25 mm (0.98 in) AA machine guns (2×3); 12 × Type 3 depth charge throwers; 1 × depth charge chute; 120 × depth charges; From 1944 : as above, plus; 1 × 81 mm (3.2 in) mortar

CD-13 was a Type C escort ship (Kaibōkan) of the Imperial Japanese Navy during the Second World War.

== History ==
CD-13 was laid down by Nippon Kokan K. K. at their Tsurumi Shipyard on 18 December 1943, launched on 9 February 1944, and completed and commissioned on 3 April 1944. She was assigned to the Kure Guard Force, Yokosuka Naval District under Reserve Lieutenant Kondo Genichi. During the war CD-13 was mostly busy on escort duties.

On 26 June 1945, she was attached to the 4th escort unit, Maizuru Guard Force, Maizuru Naval District. On 14 August 1945, she arrived in pursuit of the American submarine USS Torsk which had just sunk her fellow Type C escort ship CD-47 off Maizuru in the Sea of Japan at 35°42′N 134°36′E. Torsk spotted her on sonar and fired two Mark 27 torpedoes from a depth of 400 feet (120 m). At 1225, she received a single torpedo hit to the stern and at 1235, the order to abandon ship was given. She sank at 1255 at 35°41′N 134°35′E. 28 crewman were killed.

CD-13 was struck from the Navy List on 15 September 1945. She was the last Japanese ship sunk in action during World War II (ships would continue to be lost to mines). Until the sinking of the IRIS Dena on 4 March 2026, she was also the last enemy ship fired on by a US submarine.

== Additional sources ==
- "Escort Vessels of the Imperial Japanese Navy special issue". Ships of the World (in Japanese). Vol. 45. Kaijinsha. February 1996.
- Model Art Extra No.340, Drawings of Imperial Japanese Naval Vessels Part-1 (in Japanese). Model Art Co. Ltd. October 1989.
- The Maru Special, Japanese Naval Vessels No.49, Japanese submarine chasers and patrol boats (in Japanese). Ushio Shobō. March 1981.
