= Type C escort ship =

1943 class of Japanese escort ships

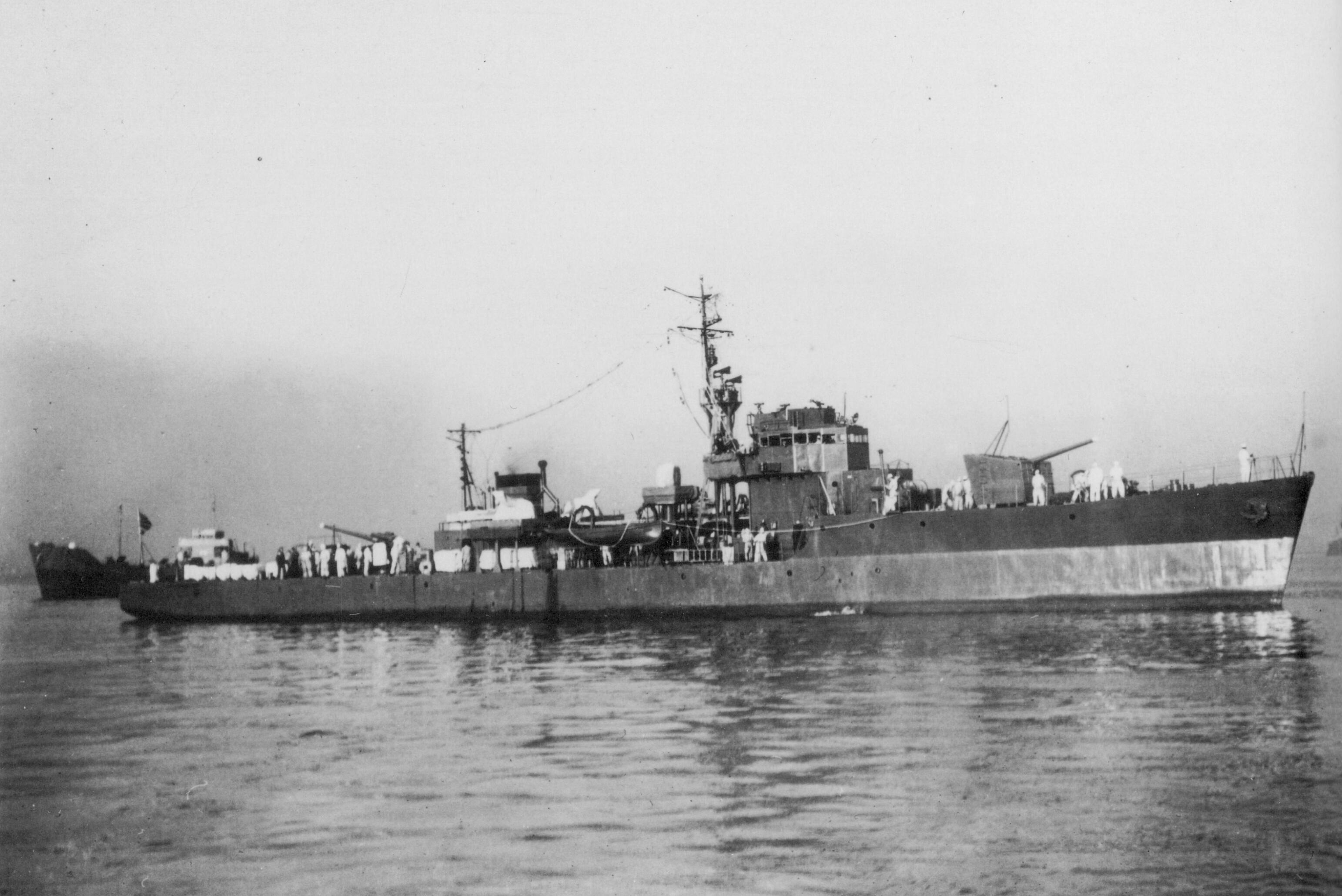
- No.1 off the coast of Kure, March 1, 1944

Class overview
- Name: No.1-class escort ship
- Builders: Maizuru Naval Arsenal; Kyōwa Zōsen Corporation; Mitsubishi Heavy Industries; Naniwa Dock Company; Nihonkai Dock Company; Nihon Kōkan; Niigata Iron Works
- Operators: Imperial Japanese Navy; Republic of China Navy; Republic of China Army; People's Liberation Army Navy; Soviet Navy
- Preceded by: Ukuru class
- Cost: 5,015,000 JPY
- Built: 1943–1946
- In commission: 1944–1980
- Planned: 300
- Completed: 56
- Canceled: 79
- Lost: 28
- Retired: 28

General characteristics
- Type: Escort ship
- Displacement: 745 long tons (757 t) standard
- Length: 67.5 m (221 ft)
- Beam: 8.4 m (27 ft 7 in)
- Draught: 2.9 m (10 ft)
- Propulsion: 2 shaft, geared diesel engines, 1,900 hp (1,417 kW)
- Speed: 16.5 knots (19.0 mph; 30.6 km/h)
- Range: 6,500 nmi (12,000 km) at 14 kn (16 mph; 26 km/h)
- Complement: 136
- Sensors & processing systems: Type 22-Go radar; Type 93 sonar; Type 3 hydrophone
- Armament: As built : 2 × 120 mm (4.7 in)/45 cal DP guns; 6 × Type 96 25 mm (0.98 in) AA machine guns (2×3); 12 × Type 3 depth charge throwers; 1 × depth charge chute; 120 × depth charges; From 1944 : as above, plus; 1 × 81 mm (3.2 in) mortar

The Type C escort ships (丙型海防艦, Hei-gata kaibōkan) were a class of escort ships in the service of the Imperial Japanese Navy during World War II. The Japanese called them "Type C" ocean defense ships, and they were the fifth class of Kaibōkan (Kai = sea, ocean, Bo = defense, Kan = ship), a name used to denote a multi-purpose vessel.

== Background ==
The Type C, like the Ukuru and Mikura classes, were dedicated to the anti-aircraft and anti-submarine roles.

On 22 April 1943, the Navy General Staff decided a mass production of escort ships, because of the urgent need to protect the convoys which were under constant attack. The plan was to build a basic escort ship of around 800 tons, with a simple design for easy construction. The first designs, for "Type A" Etorofu class and "Type B" Mikura class, still needed too many man-hours for building, so in June 1943, the Navy General Staff planned for a simplified design. The result was the Ukuru class, and a scaled-down model of the Mikura class, which became the "Type C" and "Type D" escort classes.

== Design ==
Because of Japan's deteriorating war situation, the Type C was a further simplification of the Ukuru design. They were smaller by 200 tons and the diesel engines that propelled them were also smaller, at 1,900 shaft horsepower (1,400 kW) versus 4,200 shaft horsepower (3,100 kW) for the Ukurus. Because of the decrease in engine power, the speed fell from 19.5 knots (36.1 km/h; 22.4 mph) to 16.5 knots (30.6 km/h; 19.0 mph). The range remained the same, 6,500 nautical miles (12,000 km; 7,500 mi) at 14 knots (26 km/h; 16 mph). The number of 4.7-inch (119 mm) guns went from three to two. The number of depth charges aboard was the same, 120, but the number of depth charge throwers was decreased from 18 to 12 and the depth charge chutes were decreased from two to one.

== Construction ==
The design work of the Type C ships started in March 1943, the same time as the Ukuru class. They were built concurrently with the Ukuru class and the Type D. The Type C vessels were given odd numbers, while the Type D were given even numbers. The Type C were constructed using prefabricated sections that enabled them to be built in as little as three to four months. The lead ship, No.1 (CD-1) was constructed at Mitsubishi Heavy Industries, laid down on 15 September 1943, and completed with No.3 (CD-3) on 29 February 1944.

== Service ==
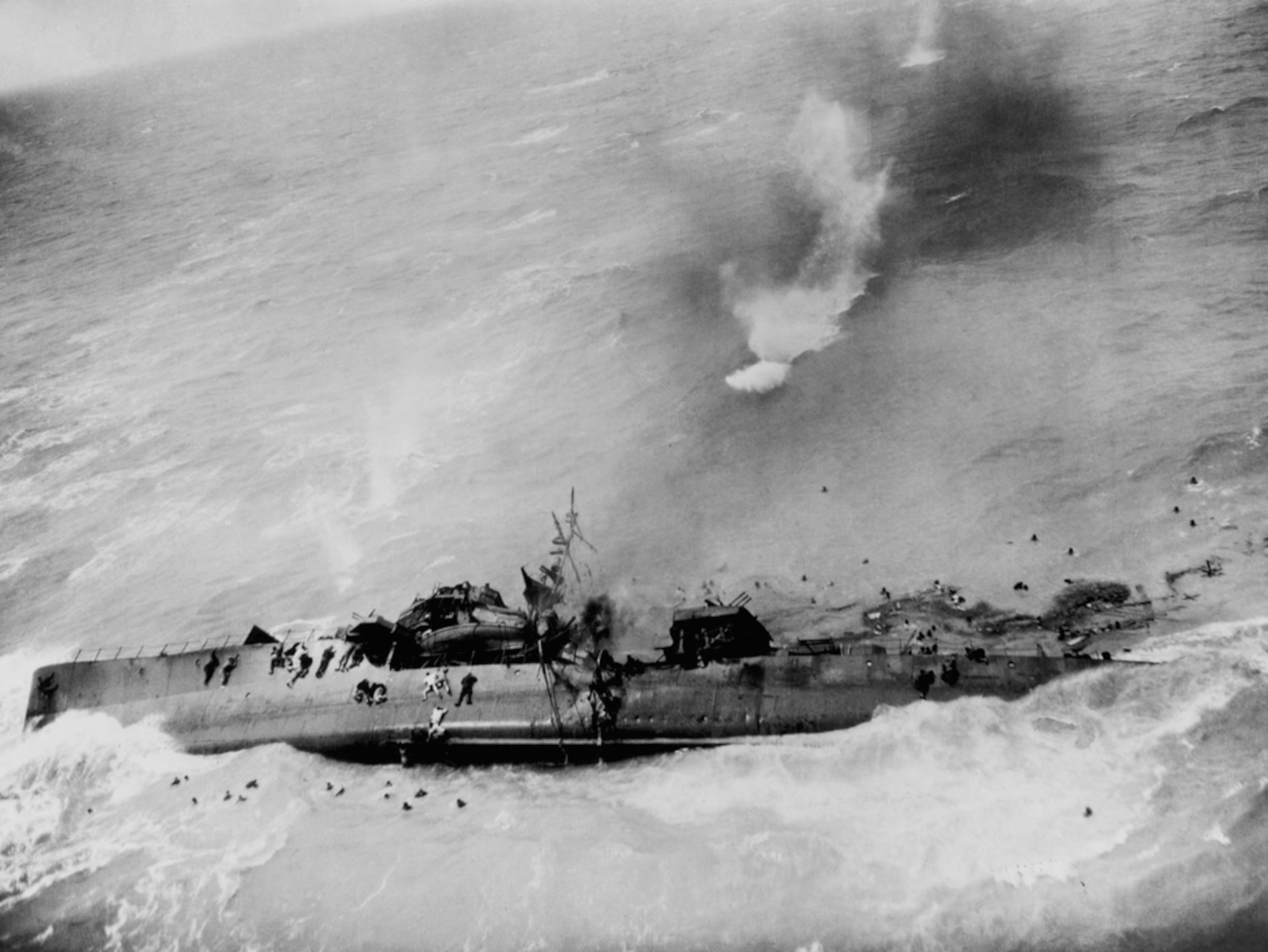
No.1 sinking south of Xiamen after an attack by USAAF aircraft, 6 April 1945

The Type C escorts were assigned to the Destroyer Divisions and Escort Divisions for convoy escort operations. However, by 1944 the advantage had passed to the US, and many Type C vessels became casualties as the Japanese merchant fleet was devastated by the American submarine offensive. There were 53 finished during the war of the 300 planned, and several completed after World War II ended. 26 were sunk during the war.

== Successes against submarines ==
- USS Growler was sunk on 8 November 1944 by CD-19 with Mikura-class escort ship Chiburi and destroyer Shigure.
- USS Trigger was sunk on 28 March 1945 by CD-33 and CD-59 with Mikura.
- USS Bonefish was sunk on 19 June 1945 by Type C vessels CD-63, CD-75 and CD-207 with Okinawa and CD-158.
- USS Salmon was rendered unfit for further service by damage from CD-33 and CD-29 with CD-22 on 30 October 1944.

== Ships in class ==
Under the Wartime Naval Armaments Supplement Programme, it was proposed to build 300 Type C and 200 Type D escorts. These were assigned the Programme numbers #2401-#2700 for the Type C vessels, with #2701-#2900 for the Type D vessels. In view of the vast number intended, no names were allocated, but only numbers; odd numbers from No.1 upwards were assigned to Type C escorts, while even numbers from No.2 upwards were assigned to Type D escorts.

The first 132 of the Type C escorts were authorised under the 1943 Fiscal Year, but just 53 were completed and the others cancelled. The remaining 168 Type C vessels were authorised under the 1944 Fiscal Year, but no contracts were ever issued.

| Prog. No. | Ship | Builder | Laid down | Launched | Completed | Fate |
|---|---|---|---|---|---|---|
| #2401 | No.1 | Mitsubishi, Kōbe Shipyard | 15 September 1943 | 29 December 1943 | 29 February 1944 | Sunk by USAAF aircraft south of Xiamen, 6 April 1945. |
| #2402 | No.3 | Mitsubishi, Kōbe Shipyard | 15 September 1943 | 29 December 1943 | 29 February 1944 | Sunk by USN aircraft northwest of Keelung, 9 January 1945. |
| #2403 | No.5 | Nihon Kōkan, Tsurumi Shipyard | 23 October 1943 | 15 January 1944 | 19 March 1944 | Sunk by USN aircraft west of Masinloc, 21 September 1944. |
| #2404 | No.7 | Nihon Kōkan, Tsurumi Shipyard | 23 October 1943 | 18 January 1944 | 10 March 1944 | Sunk by USS Ray west of Vigan City, 14 November 1944. Rebuilt in Jiangnan Shipyard, recommissioned as PLAN FFG Nanning. Decommissioned 1979. |
| #2405 | No.9 | Mitsubishi, Kōbe Shipyard | 15 October 1943 | 15 January 1944 | 10 March 1944 | Sunk by USS Gato in Yellow Sea, 14 February 1945. |
| #2406 | No.11 | Mitsubishi, Kōbe Shipyard | 15 October 1943 | 15 January 1944 | 15 March 1944 | Heavy damaged by USAAF aircraft in Ormoc Bay, 10 November 1944. Later scuttled. |
| #2407 | No.13 | Nihon Kōkan, Tsurumi Shipyard | 18 November 1943 | 9 February 1944 | 3 April 1944 | Sunk by USS Torsk at south of Hyōgo, 14 August 1945. |
| #2408 | No.15 | Nihon Kōkan, Tsurumi Shipyard | 18 November 1943 | 21 February 1944 | 8 April 1944 | Sunk by USS Raton to west of Spratly Island, 6 June 1944. |
| #2409 | No.17 | Nihon Kōkan, Tsurumi Shipyard | 15 December 1943 | 26 February 1944 | 13 April 1944 | Sunk by USN aircraft off Saint Jacques, 12 January 1945. |
| #2410 | No.19 | Nihon Kōkan, Tsurumi Shipyard | 15 December 1943 | 28 February 1944 | 28 April 1944 | Sunk by USN aircraft off Saint Jacques, 12 January 1945. |
| #2411 | No.21 | Nihonkai Dock Company | 1 December 1943 | 31 March 1944 | 18 July 1944 | Sunk by USS Seahorse to east of Pratas Island, 6 October 1944. |
| #2412 | No.23 | Nihonkai Dock Company | 10 February 1944 | 20 May 1944 | 15 September 1944 | Sunk by USN aircraft at north of Qui Nhon Bay, 12 January 1945. |
| #2413 | No.25 | Nihon Kōkan, Tsurumi Shipyard | 1 February 1944 | 14 May 1944 | 2 July 1944 | Sunk by USS Springer in Yellow Sea, 3 May 1945. |
| #2414 | No.27 | Nihon Kōkan, Tsurumi Shipyard | 16 February 1944 | 3 June 1944 | 20 July 1944 | Decommissioned on 20 November 1945. Surrendered to United Kingdom, 14 August 1947. Later scrapped. |
| #2415 | No.29 | Nihon Kōkan, Tsurumi Shipyard | 2 March 1944 | 26 June 1944 | 8 August 1944 | Decommissioned on 20 November 1945. Scrapped on 1 March 1948. |
| #2416 | No.31 | Nihon Kōkan, Tsurumi Shipyard | 3 March 1944 | 4 July 1944 | 21 August 1944 | Sunk by USS Tirante in Yellow Sea, 14 April 1945. |
| #2417 | No.33 | Nihon Kōkan, Tsurumi Shipyard | 26 May 1944 | 22 July 1944 | 31 August 1944 | Sunk by USN aircraft to east of Aoshima, 28 March 1945. |
| #2418 | No.35 | Nihon Kōkan, Tsurumi Shipyard | 30 May 1944 | 3 September 1944 | 11 October 1944 | Sunk by USN aircraft at south of French Indochina, 12 January 1945. |
| #2419 | No.37 | Nihonkai Dock Company | 5 April 1944 | 5 August 1944 | 3 November 1944 | Decommissioned on 15 September 1945. Surrendered to United States, 4 September 1947. Scrapped on 30 November 1947. |
| #2420 | No.39 | Nihon Kōkan, Tsurumi Shipyard | 10 June 1944 | 13 August 1944 | 27 September 1944 | Sunk by USAAF aircraft off Geoje Island, 7 August 1945. |
| #2421 | No.41 | Nihon Kōkan, Tsurumi Shipyard | 1 July 1944 | 8 September 1944 | 16 October 1944 | Sunk by USS Sea Owl at Tsushima Strait, 9 June 1945. |
| #2422 | No.43 | Mitsubishi, Kōbe Shipyard | 10 April 1944 | 22 June 1944 | 31 July 1944 | Sunk by USN aircraft off Cape Padaran, 12 January 1945. |
| #2423 | No.45 | Nihonkai Dock Company | 25 May 1944 | 5 October 1944 | 23 December 1944 | Decommissioned on 30 November 1945. Scrapped on 30 April 1948. |
| #2424 | No.47 | Nihon Kōkan, Tsurumi Shipyard | 15 July 1944 | 29 September 1944 | 2 November 1944 | Sunk by USS Torsk at south of Hyōgo, 14 August 1945. |
| #2425 | No.49 | Nihon Kōkan, Tsurumi Shipyard | 31 July 1944 | 15 October 1944 | 16 November 1944 | Decommissioned on 30 November 1945. Surrendered to United States, 1 September 1947. Scrapped on 1 February 1948. |
| #2426 | No.51 | Mitsubishi, Kōbe Shipyard | 1 May 1944 | 20 August 1944 | 21 September 1944 | Sunk by USN aircraft to north of Qui Nhon Bay, 12 January 1945. |
| #2427 | No.53 | Nihon Kōkan, Tsurumi Shipyard | 15 August 1944 | 29 October 1944 | 28 November 1944 | Sunk by USS Bergall east of Cam Ranh Bay, 7 February 1945. |
| #2428 | No.55 | Nihon Kōkan, Tsurumi Shipyard | 20 August 1944 | 4 November 1944 | 20 December 1944 | Decommissioned on 5 October 1945. Surrendered to United Kingdom, 16 July 1947. Later scrapped. |
| #2429 | No.57 | Nihon Kōkan, Tsurumi Shipyard | 10 September 1944 | 15 November 1944 | 13 January 1945 | Decommissioned on 5 October 1945. Converted to breakwater at Ube, May 1948. |
| #2430 | No.59 | Nihon Kōkan, Tsurumi Shipyard | 25 September 1944 | 22 November 1944 | 2 February 1945 | Decommissioned on 5 October 1945. Collided with Hyūga and sunk at Kure, 30 July 1946. Salvaged and scrapped on 9 November 1947. |
| #2431 | No.61 | Maizuru Naval Arsenal | 1 April 1944 | 25 July 1944 | 15 September 1944 | Decommissioned on 3 May 1947. Later scrapped. |
| #2432 | No.63 | Mitsubishi, Kōbe Shipyard | 1 July 1944 | 20 September 1944 | 15 October 1944 | Decommissioned on 30 September 1945. Scrapped on 30 April 1948. |
| #2433 | No.65 | Nihonkai Dock Company | 10 August 1944 | 30 November 1944 | 13 February 1945 | Sunk by USN aircraft at Muroran, 14 July 1945. Salvaged and scrapped in July 1947. |
| #2434 | No.67 | Maizuru Naval Arsenal | 15 June 1944 | 15 September 1944 | 12 November 1944 | Decommissioned on 25 October 1945. Surrendered to Republic of China, 6 July 1947, and renamed Yingkan. Renamed Rui'an (PF-73) 1952. Decommissioned 1963. |
| #2435 | No.69 | Mitsubishi, Kōbe Shipyard | 24 August 1944 | 28 November 1944 | 20 December 1944 | Heavy damaged by USAAF aircraft off Hainan Island, 9 March 1945. Sank on 16 March 1945. |
| #2436 | No.71 | Nihon Kōkan, Tsurumi Shipyard | 5 October 1944 | 3 December 1944 | 12 March 1945 | Decommissioned on 5 October 1945. Surrendered to Soviet Union, 28 August 1947. Served in Soviet Pacific Ocean Fleet as patrol ship EK-43 (1947), oceanographic research ship West (1948), renamed Ostrovnoy (1953). Decommissioned on 31 January 1964 and scrapped. |
| #2437 | No.73 | Nihon Kōkan, Tsurumi Shipyard | 8 October 1944 | 10 December 1944 | 5 April 1945 | Sunk by USS Sunfish at southeast of Iwate, 16 April 1945. |
| #2438 | No.75 | Nihonkai Dock Company | 18 October 1944 | 20 February 1945 | 21 April 1945 | Sunk (probably by mine) off Nō 10 August 1945. |
| #2439 | No.77 | Nihon Kōkan, Tsurumi Shipyard | 2 November 1944 | 18 December 1944 | 31 March 1945 | Decommissioned on 30 November 1945. Surrendered to Soviet Union, 28 August 1947. Served in Soviet Pacific Ocean Fleet as patrol ship EK-45 (1947), target ship TsL-45 (1948), repair ship PM-63 (1955). Decommissioned on 25 January 1969 and scrapped. |
| #2440 | No.79 | Nihon Kōkan, Tsurumi Shipyard | 6 November 1944 | 30 December 1944 | 6 May 1945 | Decommissioned on 5 October 1945. Surrendered to Soviet Union, 29 July 1947. Served in Soviet Pacific Ocean Fleet as patrol ship EK-39 (1947), target ship TsL-39 (1948), oceanographic research ship Sozh (1949). Decommissioned on 30 August 1960 and scrapped. |
| #2441 | No.81 | Maizuru Naval Arsenal | 7 August 1944 | 15 October 1944 | 15 December 1944 | Decommissioned on 5 October 1945. Surrendered to Republic of China, 29 August 1947, and renamed Yuan. Escape to People's Liberation Army 13 February 1949, and renamed Shengyang. Decommissioned 1980. |
| #2442 | No.83 | Kyōwa Zōsen and Naniwa Dock Company | 1944 | 16 January 1945 | - | Still incomplete at the end of war (85%). Scrapped on 17 March 1948. |
| #2443 | No.85 | Nihon Kōkan, Tsurumi Shipyard | 20 November 1944 | 27 January 1945 | 31 May 1945 | Decommissioned on 25 October 1945. Surrendered to Republic of China 6 July 1947, and renamed Shian. Escape to People's Liberation Army 23 April 1949. Sunk by aircraft at Yanziji, 28 April 1949. |
| #2444 | No.87 | Nihon Kōkan, Tsurumi Shipyard | 27 November 1944 | 15 February 1945 | 20 May 1945 | Decommissioned on 5 October 1945. Surrendered to United States, 29 July 1947. Scrapped on 1 March 1948. |
| #2445 | No.89 | Nihonkai Dock Company | 1944 | 3 May 1945 | - | Incomplete until the end of war (95%). Scrapped in November 1947. |
| #2446 | No.91 | | - | - | - | Cancelled in August 1944. |
| #2447 | No.93 | Kyōwa Zōsen | 20 May 1944 | - | - | Company was closed and construction stopped in May 1945. Later scrapped. |
| #2448 | No.95 | Nihon Kōkan, Tsurumi Shipyard | 27 November 1944 | 14 April 1945 | 4 July 1945 | Decommissioned on 15 September 1945. Scrapped on 20 July 1948. |
| #2449 | No.97 | Nihon Kōkan, Tsurumi Shipyard | 5 October 1944 | 25 May 1945 | 16 December 1945 | Surrendered incomplete in August 1945. Decommissioned on 1 April 1946. Scrapped on 27 October 1947. |
| #2450 | No.99 | | - | - | - | Cancelled in August 1944. |
| #2451 | No.101 | Kyōwa Zōsen | 8 September 1944 | - | - | Company was closed and construction stopped in May 1945. Later scrapped. |
| #2452 | No.103 | | - | - | - | Cancelled in August 1944. |
| #2453 | No.105 | Nihon Kōkan, Tsurumi Shipyard | 24 December 1944 | January 1946 | 15 April 1946 | Surrendered to Soviet Union, 5 July 1947. Served in Soviet Pacific Ocean Fleet as patrol ship EK-34 (1947), target ship TsL-34 (1948), oceanographic research ship Khersones (1949). Decommissioned on 3 December 1960 and scrapped. |
| #2454 | No.107 | Nihon Kōkan, Tsurumi Shipyard | 3 January 1945 | 16 March 1946 | 30 May 1946 | Surrendered to Republic of China 29 August 1947, and renamed Chaoan (PF-74). Decommissioned 1963. |
| #2455 | No.109 | Nihon Kōkan, Tsurumi Shipyard | 26 January 1945 | - | - | Construction stopped on 1 April 1945. Later scrapped. |
| #2456 #2457 #2458 | No.111; No.113; No.115 | | - | - | - | Cancelled in August 1944. |
| #2459 | No.117 | Nihon Kōkan, Tsurumi Shipyard | 1 February 1945 | - | - | Construction stopped in March 1945. Later scrapped. |
| #2460 to #2502 | Odd numbers from No.119 to No.203 | | - | - | - | Cancelled in August 1944. |
| #2503 | No.205 | Nihonkai Dock Company | 10 May 1944 | 15 August 1944 | 30 October 1944 | Decommissioned on 5 October 1945. Surrendered to Republic of China 31 July 1947, and renamed Chinan (PF-75). Decommissioned 1960. |
| #2504 | No.207 | Naniwa Dock Company | 17 May 1944 | 24 August 1944 | 15 October 1944 | Decommissioned on 5 October 1945. Surrendered to United States, 4 July 1947. Sunk as target at, 13 August 1947. |
| #2505 #2506 | No.209; No.211 | | - | - | - | Cancelled in August 1944. |
| #2507 | No.213 | Mitsubishi, Kōbe Shipyard | 24 September 1944 | 15 January 1945 | 12 February 1945 | Sunk by naval mine at Busan, 18 August 1945. |
| #2508 | No.215 | Niigata Iron Works | 20 July 1944 | 10 November 1944 | 30 December 1944 | Decommissioned on 5 October 1945. Surrendered to Republic of China 6 July 1947, and renamed Liaohai. Transferred to Army, 1948. Returned to Navy, 1953. Decommissioned 1960. |
| #2509 | No.217 | Mitsubishi, Kōbe Shipyard | 1 December 1944 | 26 February 1945 | 17 July 1945 | Decommissioned on 30 November 1945. Surrendered to United Kingdom, 5 September 1947. Scrapped on 10 February 1948. |
| #2510 | No.219 | Naniwa Dock Company | 2 September 1944 | 30 November 1944 | 25 January 1945 | Sunk by USAAF aircraft at Hakodate, 12 July 1945. |
| #2511 | No.221 | Niigata Iron Works, Osaka | 11 September 1944 | 26 December 1944 | 2 April 1945 | Decommissioned on 30 November 1945. Surrendered to Soviet Union, 29 July 1947. Served in Soviet Pacific Ocean Fleet as patrol ship EK-40 (1947), target ship TsL-40 (1948), rescue ship Zhiguli (1949). Decommissioned on 11 March 1958 and scrapped. |
| #2512 | No.223 | Mitsubishi, Kōbe Shipyard | 1944 | 4 July 1945 | - | Construction stopped on 23 May 1945 (50%). Scrapped on 23 October 1947. |
| #2513 | No.225 | Niigata Iron Works | 22 November 1944 | 26 March 1945 | 28 May 1945 | Decommissioned on 5 October 1945. Scrapped on 30 April 1948. |
| #2514 | No.227 | Naniwa Dock Company, Osaka | 5 December 1944 | 10 February 1945 | 15 June 1945 | Decommissioned on 5 October 1945. Surrendered to Soviet Union, 5 July 1947. Served in Soviet Pacific Ocean Fleet as patrol ship EK-35 (1947), target ship TsL-35 (1948), oceanographic research ship Siurkum (1949)/ Decommissioned on 11 March 1958 and scrapped. |
| #2515 | No.229 | Mitsubishi, Kōbe Shipyard | 16 January 1945 | - | - | Construction stopped in January 1945. Later scrapped. |
| #2516 #2517 | No.231; No.233 | | - | - | - | Cancelled in August 1944. |
| #2518 | No.235 | Niigata Iron Works | 15 February 1945 | - | - | Construction stopped in February 1945. Later scrapped. |
| #2519 to #2532 | Odd numbers from No.237 to No.263 | | - | - | - | Cancelled between August 1944 and March 1945. |
| #2533 to #2700 | 168 vessels | | | | | They were projected only, and never ordered. |

== See also ==
- Hiburi-class escort ship
- Shimushu-class escort ship
- Type D escort ship
- Destroyer escort
- Tacoma-class frigate
- Flower-class corvette
