= Japanese escort ship No.17 =

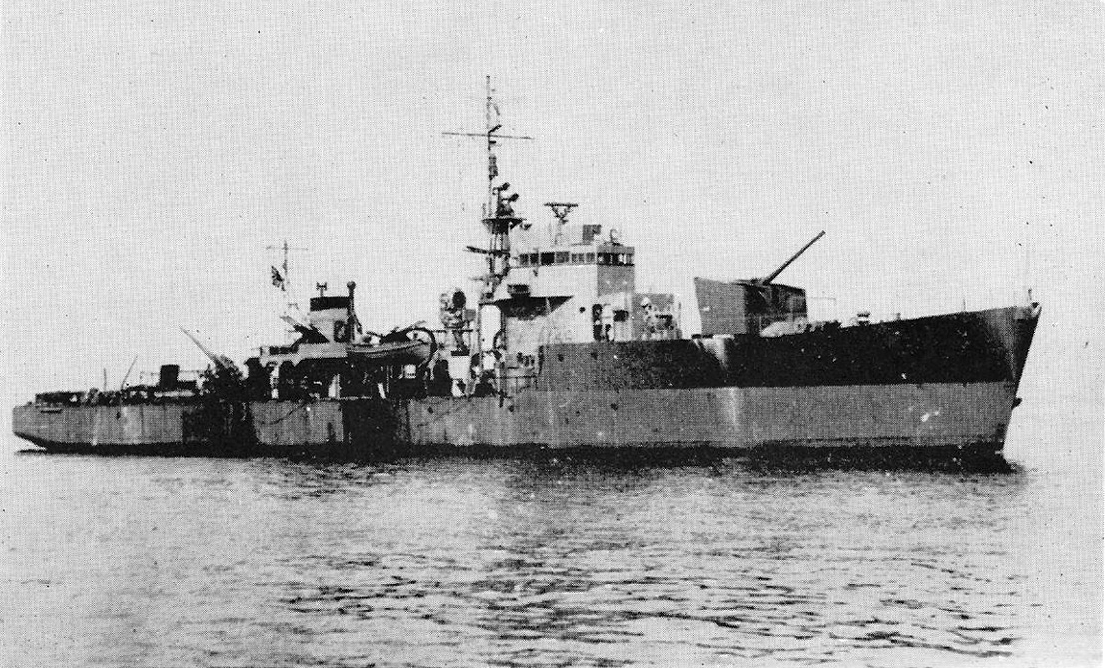
- No.17 on 10 April 1944 at Tokyo Bay

History

Empire of Japan
- Name: CD-17
- Builder: Nippon Kokan K. K.
- Laid down: 15 December 1943
- Launched: 26 February 1944
- Completed: 13 April 1944
- Commissioned: 13 April 1944
- Stricken: 10 March 1945
- Fate: Torpedoed 12 January 1945

General characteristics
- Class & type: Type C escort ship
- Displacement: 745 long tons (757 t) (standard)
- Length: 67.5 m (221 ft)
- Beam: 8.4 m (27 ft 7 in)
- Draught: 2.9 m (10 ft)
- Propulsion: Geared diesel engines; 1,900 hp (1,417 kW); 2 shafts
- Speed: 16.5 knots (30.6 km/h; 19.0 mph)
- Range: 6,500 nmi (12,000 km) at 14 kn (26 km/h; 16 mph)
- Complement: 136
- Sensors & processing systems: Type 22-Go radar; Type 93 sonar; Type 3 hydrophone
- Armament: As built : 2 × 120 mm (4.7 in)/45 cal DP guns; 6 × Type 96 Type 96 25 mm (0.98 in) AA machine guns (2×3); 12 × Type 3 depth charge throwers; 1 × depth charge chute; 120 × depth charges; From 1944 : as above, plus; 1 × 81 mm (3.2 in) mortar

CD-17 was a Type C escort ship (Kaibōkan) of the Imperial Japanese Navy during the Second World War.

== History ==
CD-17 was laid down by Nippon Kokan K. K. at their Tsurumi Shipyard on 15 December 1943, launched on 26 February 1944, and completed and commissioned on 13 April 1944. During the war CD-17 was mostly busy on escort duties.

On 12 January 1945, off Cape St. Jacques in the South China Sea (10°20′N 107°50′E), CD-17 was attacked by aircraft operating from the aircraft carriers USS Lexington, USS Hancock and USS Hornet which were part of Vice Admiral John S. McCain, Sr.'s Task Force 38 that had entered the South China Sea to raid Japanese shipping. She received three torpedo hits and sank at 0952. 159 crewman including 12 officers were killed. CD-19 and Chiburi were also sunk.

CD-17 was struck from the Navy List on 10 March 1945.

== Additional sources ==
- "Escort Vessels of the Imperial Japanese Navy special issue". Ships of the World (in Japanese). Vol. 45. Kaijinsha. February 1996.
- Model Art Extra No.340, Drawings of Imperial Japanese Naval Vessels Part-1 (in Japanese). Model Art Co. Ltd. October 1989.
- The Maru Special, Japanese Naval Vessels No.49, Japanese submarine chasers and patrol boats (in Japanese). Ushio Shobō. March 1981.
