= Japanese escort ship CD-75 =

Imperial Japanese Navy warship

History

Imperial Japanese Navy
- Name: CD-75
- Builder: Nipponkai Zosensho K.K., Toyama
- Laid down: 5 April 1944
- Launched: 5 August 1944
- Completed: 21 April 1945
- Commissioned: 21 April 1945
- Stricken: 30 November 1945
- Fate: Scuttled after running aground, 10 August 1945

General characteristics
- Class & type: Type C escort ship
- Displacement: 745 long tons (757 t) (standard)
- Length: 67.5 m (221 ft)
- Beam: 8.4 m (27 ft 7 in)
- Draught: 2.9 m (10 ft)
- Propulsion: Geared diesel engines; 1,900 hp (1,417 kW); 2 shafts
- Speed: 16.5 knots (30.6 km/h; 19.0 mph)
- Range: 6,500 nmi (12,000 km) at 14 kn (26 km/h; 16 mph)
- Complement: 136
- Sensors & processing systems: Type 22-Go radar; Type 93 sonar; Type 3 hydrophone
- Armament: As built : 2 × 120 mm (4.7 in)/45 cal DP guns; 6 × Type 96 Type 96 25 mm (0.98 in) AA machine guns (2×3); 12 × Type 3 depth charge throwers; 1 × depth charge chute; 120 × depth charges; 1 × 81 mm (3.2 in) mortar

CD-75 was a C Type class escort ship (Kaibōkan) of the Imperial Japanese Navy during the Second World War.

== History ==
She was laid down by Nipponkai Zosensho K.K. at their Toyama shipyard on 5 April 1944, launched on 5 August 1944, and completed and commissioned on 21 April 1945. During the war CD-75 was mostly busy on escort duties.

On 18 June 1945, in Toyama Bay, the submarine USS Bonefish (SS-223) was sunk by the combined efforts of the escort ships CD-75, Okinawa, CD-63, CD-158 and CD-207.

On 10 August 1945, she departed from Wakkanai, Hokkaido, and soon after ran aground. She was scuttled by her crew off Nō, Niigata. Some sources indicate she may have struck a mine. On 30 November 1945, she was struck from the Navy List.

== Additional sources ==
- "Escort Vessels of the Imperial Japanese Navy special issue". Ships of the World (in Japanese). Vol. 45. Kaijinsha. February 1996.
- Model Art Extra No.340, Drawings of Imperial Japanese Naval Vessels Part-1 (in Japanese). Model Art Co. Ltd. October 1989.
- The Maru Special, Japanese Naval Vessels No.49, Japanese submarine chasers and patrol boats (in Japanese). Ushio Shobō. March 1981.
