= USS Torsk =

Submarine of the United States

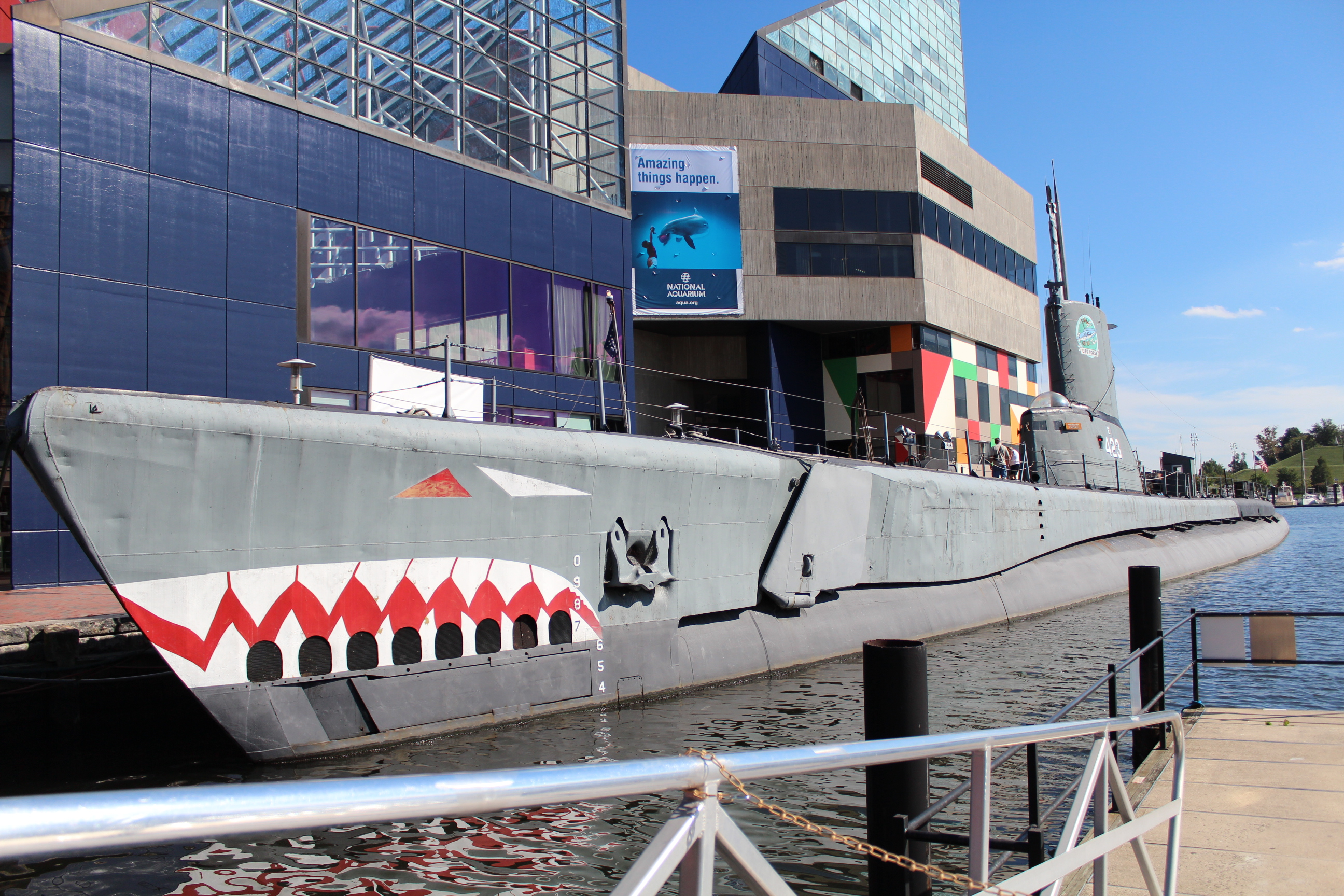
- USS Torsk (SS-423) at Pier Three in Baltimore Harbor, September 2012

History

United States
- Name: Torsk
- Namesake: Torsk fish
- Builder: Portsmouth Naval Shipyard, Kittery, Maine
- Laid down: 7 June 1944
- Launched: 6 September 1944
- Commissioned: 16 December 1944
- Decommissioned: 4 March 1968
- Stricken: 15 December 1971
- Identification: Hull number: SS-423
- Fate: Museum ship at Baltimore, Maryland, 26 September 1972
- Status: Undergoing restoration

General characteristics
- Class & type: Tench-class diesel-electric submarine
- Displacement: 1,570 tons (1,595 t) surfaced; 2,414 tons (2,453 t) submerged
- Length: 311 ft 8 in (95.00 m)
- Beam: 27 ft 4 in (8.33 m)
- Draft: 17 ft 0 in (5.18 m) maximum
- Installed power: 5,400 shp (4.0 MW) surfaced; 2,740 shp (2.0 MW) submerged
- Propulsion: 4 × Fairbanks-Morse diesel engines; 2 × Sargo batteries; 2 × General Electric electric motors; two propellers
- Speed: 20.25 knots (38 km/h) surfaced; 8.75 knots (16 km/h) submerged
- Range: 11,000 nautical miles (20,000 km) surfaced at 10 knots (19 km/h)
- Endurance: 48 hours at 2 knots (3.7 km/h) submerged; 75 days on patrol
- Test depth: 400 ft (120 m)
- Complement: 10 officers, 71 enlisted
- Armament: 10 × 21-inch (530 mm) torpedo tubes (6 forward, 4 aft); 1 × 5-inch (130 mm) / 25 caliber deck gun; Bofors 40 mm and Oerlikon 20 mm cannon
- USS Torsk
- U.S. National Register of Historic Places
- U.S. National Historic Landmark
- Location within Baltimore Location within Maryland Location within the United States
- Location: Pier 3, Pratt Street, Baltimore, Maryland
- Coordinates: 39°17′06.2″N 76°36′31.4″W
- NRHP reference No.: 86000090

Significant dates
- Added to NRHP: 14 January 1986
- Designated NHL: 14 January 1986

USS Torsk (hull number SS-423), is a Tench-class submarine built for the United States Navy during World War II, currently part of the museum ship fleet of Historic Ships in Baltimore.

Armed with ten torpedo tubes, the Tench-class submarines were incremental developments of the highly-successful Gato-class submarines that formed the backbone of the US Navy's submarine force during the war. Torsk was laid down at the Portsmouth Navy Yard in June 1944, was launched in September that year, and commissioned in mid-December.

In 1945, Torsk made two war patrols off Japan, sinking one cargo vessel and two coastal defense frigates. The latter of these, torpedoed on 14 August 1945, was the last enemy ship sunk by the United States Navy in World War II. Throughout the 1950s and 1960s, she operated primarily as a training vessel; she also went on deployments to the Mediterranean Sea and helped to train elements of the Atlantic Fleet in anti-submarine tactics.

Decommissioned in 1968, Torsk replaced USS Drum at the Washington Naval Yard, where she would serve for another three years training members of the Naval Reserve. She was stricken from the Naval Vessel Register in December 1971 and turned over to the state of Maryland for use as a museum ship.

== Design ==
The Tench-class submarines were incremental improvements of the preceding Balao and Gato classes of fleet submarines that proved to be highly successful during operations against Japan in the Pacific War. The Tenches, the culmination of early wartime experiences, were the last submarine class to be built by the United States Navy during the war.

Torsk is 311 ft 8 in (95.00 m) long, with a beam of 27 ft 4 in (8.33 m) and a maximum draft of 17 ft 0 in (5.18 m). She displaced 1,570 long tons (1,600 t) surfaced and 2,414 long tons (2,453 t) submerged. The Tench-class submarines were powered by four Fairbanks-Morse Model 38D8-1/8 10-cylinder opposed piston diesel engines driving electrical generators. These were rated at 5,400 shaft horsepower (4,000 kW) for a maximum speed of 20.25 knots (38 km/h) on the surface. During underwater operations, she was powered by two 126-cell Sargo batteries that drove two low-speed direct-drive General Electric electric motors. Her electric motors provided 2,740 shp (2,040 kW) and a top speed of 8.75 knots (16 km/h) submerged. While surfaced, she had a cruising radius of 11,000 nautical miles (20,000 km) at a speed of 10 knots (19 km/h; 12 mph). Her submerged endurance was limited by the life of her batteries, which at a speed of 2 knots (3.7 km/h; 2.3 mph), would be depleted after 48 hours. She could carry enough provisions for her crew of ten officers and 71 enlisted men for 75 days of operations.

The submarine was armed with ten 21-inch (533 mm) torpedo tubes, six of which were in the bow, with the other four located in her stern. These were supplied with a total of 28 torpedoes. She was also fitted with a 5-inch (127 mm) /25 caliber deck gun and a Bofors 40 mm and Oerlikon 20 mm cannon. The deck guns were removed in 1952 as part of the US Navy's Fleet Snorkel conversion.

== Service history ==
=== World War II ===
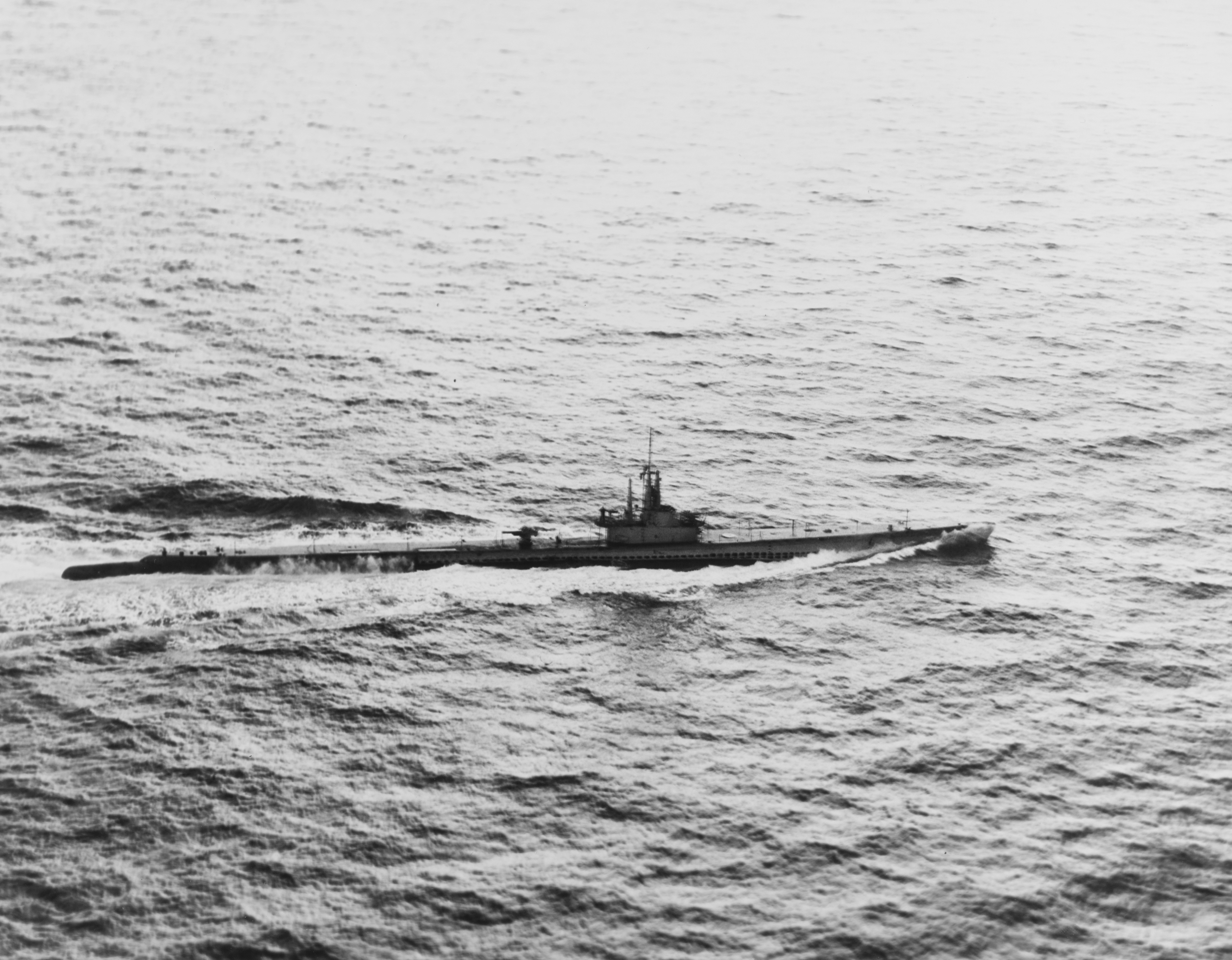
Torsk underway on 16 February 1945

The keel for Torsk, which was named for the eponymous fish, (Note: At the time, US Navy naming conventions specified that submarines were named after fish or other sea creatures.) was laid down at the Portsmouth Navy Yard on 7 June 1944. The completed hull was launched on 6 September. Work was completed by the end of the year, and she was commissioned on 16 December. Beginning on 31 December, she began training exercises that lasted until 11 February 1945; five days later she sailed to Port Everglades, Florida, where she conducted anti-submarine experiments. The vessel remained there only briefly, and on 20 February, she got underway for the Pacific Ocean, passing through the Panama Canal and arriving in Hawaii on 23 March. There, she conducted further training and underwent repairs in preparation for her first war patrol.

Beginning her first war patrol, Torsk cruised to Guam and then proceeded to Kii Suido in the Japanese home islands, arriving there on 11 May. While there, she patrolled for American air crews that had to bail out from damaged aircraft during their raids on Japan, but no aircraft went down in the area that day. Late on 11 May, she moved to the northeastern coast of Honshu, arriving two days later. Over the course of 14 and 15 May, she attempted to contact the submarine wolfpack operating in the area, and she finally rendezvoused with the submarines Sand Lance and Cero the next day. She joined their patrols on the east coast of the island, but found no Japanese vessels in the area.

Torsk encountered a Japanese coastal minelayer on 2 June between Honshu and Hokkaido. She launched a spread of six torpedoes, but the minelayer evaded them, prompting Torsk to dive to evade the expected counter-attack that did not occur. Two days later, she located a 700 long tons (710 t) freighter off Kobe Saki; she fired four torpedoes but again missed her target. Torsk departed the area on 5 June, bound for Midway Atoll, arriving there on 11 June; from there, she continued on to Pearl Harbor. After arriving on 16 June, she underwent a refit in preparation for her second patrol. Torsk began her second patrol on 17 July. She again sailed to Guam, where she stayed on 1 and 2 August, before continuing on to the Sea of Japan.

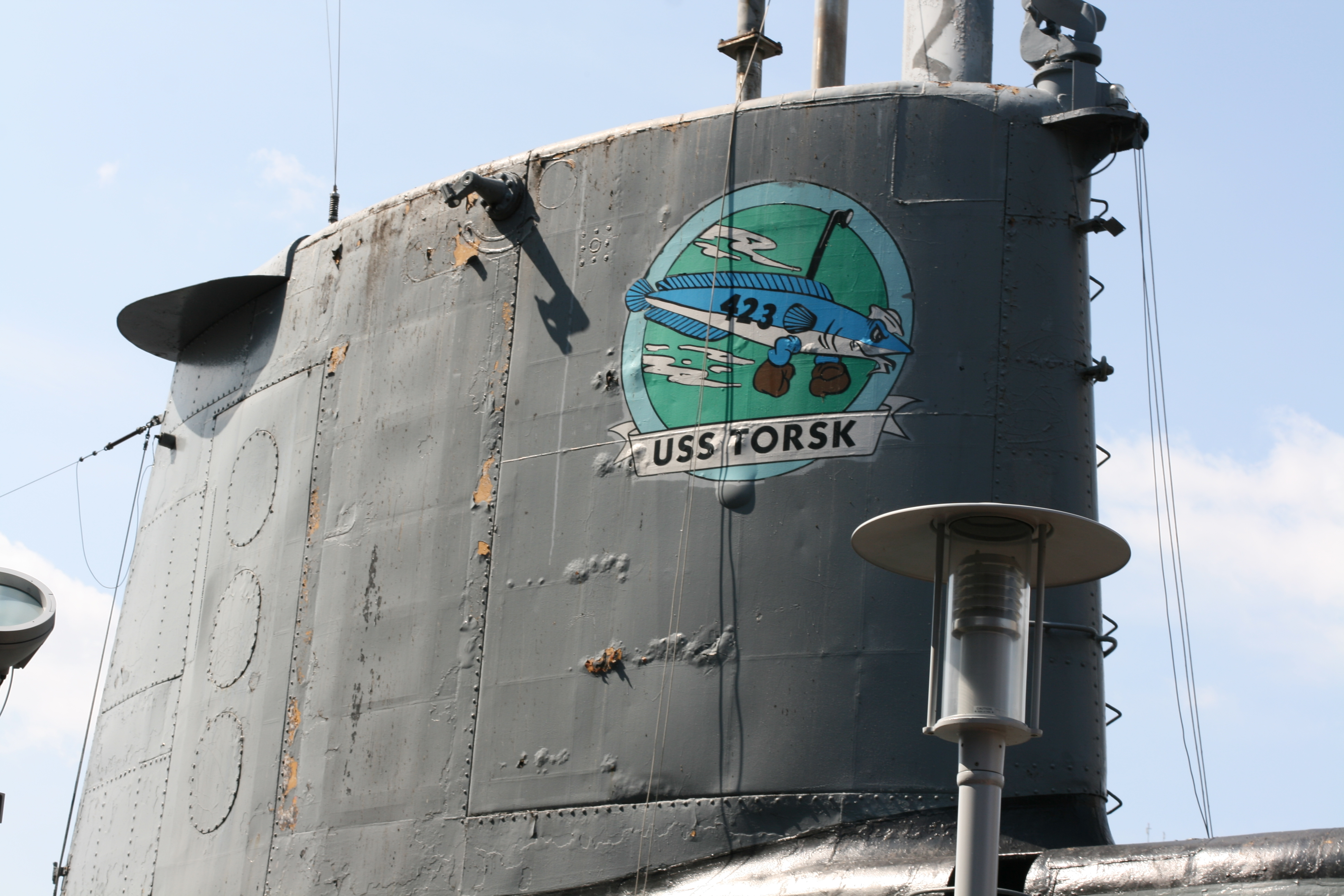
Sail and boat's mascot emblem in September 2009

On 10 August, Torsk passed through the minefields in the Tsushima Strait, and the next day, she found and took aboard seven Japanese sailors from the merchant ship Koue Maru that had been sunk four days earlier. Later on the 11th, the submarine entered her patrol area. While patrolling off Dogo Island the next morning, she located a small freighter and sank her with a submerged torpedo attack. Off Ando Saki on 13 August, Torsk found several small fishing boats and another small freighter of 873 GRT; she sank the latter and later that day, attempted to sink another cargo vessel in Wakasa Wan but her torpedoes missed.

On 14 August, she encountered a medium-sized cargo ship accompanied by No.47, a 745 long tons (757 t) Kaibōkan type escort vessel, steaming off Amarube Saki (Battle of Kasumi). When the two ships approached Kasumi Ko at 10:35, Torsk launched a new, experimental Mark 28 torpedo, an acoustic homing torpedo, at the Kaibōkan. The torpedo struck the ship and blew a hole in the stern, bending it up at a 30-degree angle and causing it to rapidly sink. Torsk then attempted to torpedo the freighter as it entered the harbor, but the torpedoes missed, possibly because they struck uncharted coral reefs.

At around 12:00, a second Kaibōkan, ship No.13, arrived in the area to hunt for Torsk; the latter fired a second Mark 28 torpedo and then dove deep to evade any depth charge attacks. After reaching a depth of 400 feet (120 m), she launched a Mark 27 torpedo, a passive acoustic torpedo. Shortly thereafter, the hydrophone operator detected a large explosion; this was the Mark 28 striking No.13, and a minute later the Mark 27 struck the vessel as well. This proved to be the last Japanese warship to be sunk in World War II, as the Japanese government announced their surrender the next day. Additional patrol vessels arrived in the area, and their presence, coupled with that of patrol aircraft, compelled Torsk to remain submerged for more than seven hours. She then surfaced and proceeded toward the Noto Peninsula. After receiving word of Japan's surrender on 15 August, Torsk continued patrolling the Sea of Japan, conducting surveillance of Japanese installations and destroying any naval mines she encountered. On 1 September, she departed the area for the Marianas Islands, passing through the Tsushima Strait two days later, and arriving in Guam on 9 September, concluding her second patrol. Torsk received two battle stars for her World War II service.

=== 1946–1971 ===
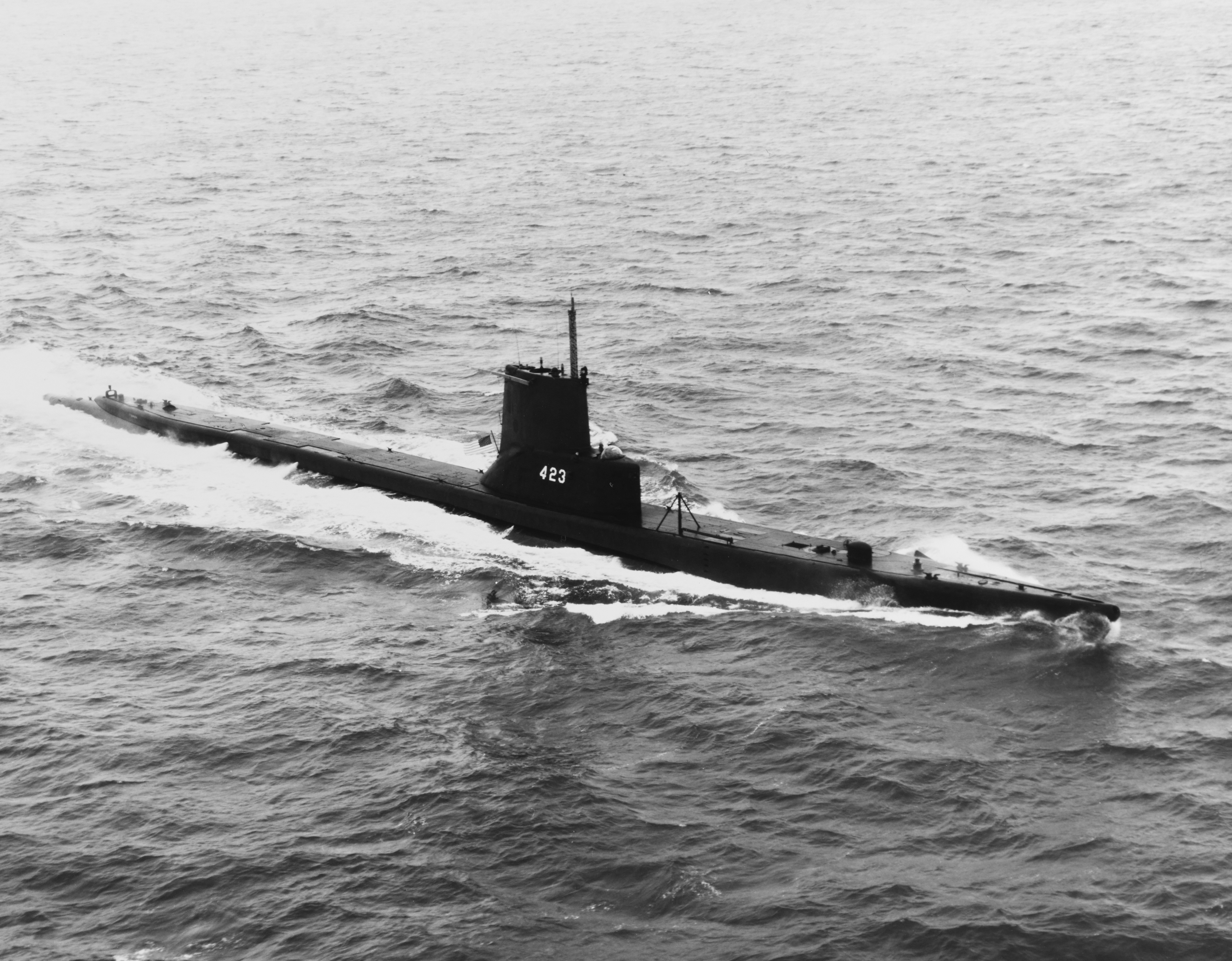
Torsk underway on 15 January 1965 after her Fleet Snorkel conversion

On 10 September, Torsk sailed from the Marianas, bound for Pearl Harbor. From there, she proceeded to the Panama Canal, sailed into the Atlantic and ultimately arrived in New London, Connecticut in mid-October. This was her home port for the next seven years, during which time she served primarily as a training ship. She was also involved with various tests and training exercises. The submarine was also used for Navy Reserve training cruises. She was assigned to Submarine Squadron 2 in June 1949 and in mid-1950 she was sent on a deployment to the Mediterranean Sea. She returned to New London later in the year for fleet maneuvers. In 1951, her training operations took her to the Caribbean Sea.

The vessel underwent the Fleet Snorkel conversion in early 1952, after which she went on another Mediterranean deployment in the middle of the year. She arrived back in New London on 27 November, after which she resumed her training duties. These activities took the boat as far north as Halifax, Nova Scotia and as far south as Havana, Cuba. Torsk was transferred to Submarine Squadron 6, based at Norfolk, Virginia. From there, she served as a training submarine for anti-submarine aircraft and surface ships to practice detecting and targeting. Torsk frequently cruised in the Caribbean throughout this period. She made a visit to the Great Lakes by way of the Saint Lawrence Seaway in June 1959, visiting numerous ports in Lake Ontario and Lake Michigan. She arrived back in Norfolk in mid-August.

Torsk resumed her Mediterranean deployments in the 1960s, which included a joint training exercise, "New Broom X", with fleet units of British Commonwealth navies. She also continued to help train anti-submarine forces of the Atlantic Fleet. She participated in the blockade of Cuba during the Cuban Missile Crisis in October 1962. Torsk received a Presidential Unit Citation for her activities during the 1958 Lebanon crisis and a Navy Commendation Medal for her activities during the operation off Cuba.

USS Torsk was decommissioned on 4 March 1968. She was taken to the Boston Navy Yard and modified to be used as a Navy Reserve training vessel, stationed in the Washington Navy Yard. She operated there until 1971, and on 15 December she was stricken from the Naval Vessel Register.

=== Museum ship ===
The Navy turned Torsk over to the state of Maryland on 26 September 1972 so she could be preserved as a museum ship; she was moored in the Inner Harbor of Baltimore, Maryland, where she remains today as part of the Historic Ships in Baltimore. As of 2025, Torsk is docked next to the LV116 Chesapeake and the National Aquarium (Pier 3). The Torsk Volunteer Association works hand-in-hand with Historic Ships in Baltimore to provide skilled restoration and maintenance activities for the vessel. Torsk was designated a National Historic Landmark on 14 January 1986. Torsk and its companions are major contributing elements in the Baltimore National Heritage Area.

USS Requin is the only other Tench-class boat currently preserved as a museum ship in the United States, at the Carnegie Science Center in Pittsburgh.

Torsk was the last US Navy submarine to engage and sink an enemy vessel until nearly 81 years later, when USS Charlotte torpedoed and sank the Iranian Navy frigate IRIS Dena during the Iran War in March 2026.
