= Japanese escort ship No.43 =

History
- Name: CD-43
- Builder: Mitsubishi Heavy Industries
- Laid down: 10 April 1944
- Launched: 22 June 1944
- Completed: 31 July 1944
- Commissioned: 31 July 1944
- Stricken: 10 March 1945
- Fate: Detonated by crew on 12 January 1945

General characteristics
- Class & type: Type C escort ship
- Displacement: 745 long tons (757 t) (standard)
- Length: 67.5 m (221 ft)
- Beam: 8.4 m (27 ft 7 in)
- Draught: 2.9 m (10 ft)
- Propulsion: Geared diesel engines; 1,900 hp (1,417 kW); 2 shafts
- Speed: 16.5 knots (30.6 km/h; 19.0 mph)
- Range: 6,500 nmi (12,000 km) at 14 kn (26 km/h; 16 mph)
- Complement: 136
- Sensors & processing systems: Type 22-Go radar; Type 93 sonar; Type 3 hydrophone
- Armament: As built : 2 × 120 mm (4.7 in)/45 cal DP guns; 6 × Type 96 Type 96 25 mm (0.98 in) AA machine guns (2×3); 12 × Type 3 depth charge throwers; 1 × depth charge chute; 120 × depth charges; From 1944 : as above, plus; 1 × 81 mm (3.2 in) mortar

CD-43 was a C Type class escort ship (Kaibōkan) of the Imperial Japanese Navy during the Second World War. She was laid down by Mitsubishi Heavy Industries at their Kobe Shipyard on 10 April 1944, launched on 22 June 1944, and completed and commissioned on 31 July 1944. During the war CD-43 was mostly busy on escort duties.

On 12 January 1945, off Cape Paderan in the South China Sea (11°10′N 108°55′E), CD-43 was strafed by aircraft from the USS Lexington (CV-16), USS Hancock (CV-19) and USS Hornet (CV-12) which were then part of Vice Admiral John S. McCain, Sr.'s Task Force 38 that had entered the South China Sea to raid Japanese shipping. 29 of her crew were killed and the steering compartment flooded. being inoperable, the captain beached the ship on an uninhabited island and using its own munitions, destroyed the ship.

CD-43 was struck from the Navy List on 10 March 1945.

== Additional sources ==
- "Escort Vessels of the Imperial Japanese Navy special issue". Ships of the World (in Japanese). Vol. 45. Kaijinsha. February 1996.
- Model Art Extra No.340, Drawings of Imperial Japanese Naval Vessels Part-1 (in Japanese). Model Art Co. Ltd. October 1989.
- The Maru Special, Japanese Naval Vessels No.49, Japanese submarine chasers and patrol boats (in Japanese). Ushio Shobō. March 1981.
