= Japanese escort ship No.35 =

WWII Imperial Japanese Navy ship

History

Empire of Japan
- Name: CD-35
- Builder: Nippon Kokan K. K.
- Laid down: 5 May 1944
- Launched: 3 September 1944
- Completed: 11 October 1944
- Commissioned: 11 October 1944
- Stricken: 10 March 1945
- Fate: Sunk by air attack 12 January 1945

General characteristics
- Class & type: Type C escort ship
- Displacement: 745 long tons (757 t) (standard)
- Length: 67.5 m (221 ft)
- Beam: 8.4 m (27 ft 7 in)
- Draught: 2.9 m (10 ft)
- Propulsion: Geared diesel engines; 1,900 hp (1,417 kW); 2 shafts
- Speed: 16.5 knots (30.6 km/h; 19.0 mph)
- Range: 6,500 nmi (12,000 km) at 14 kn (26 km/h; 16 mph)
- Complement: 136
- Sensors & processing systems: Type 22-Go radar; Type 93 sonar; Type 3 hydrophone
- Armament: As built : 2 × 120 mm (4.7 in)/45 cal DP guns; 6 × Type 96 Type 96 25 mm (0.98 in) AA machine guns (2×3); 12 × Type 3 depth charge throwers; 1 × depth charge chute; 120 × depth charges; From 1944 : as above, plus; 1 × 81 mm (3.2 in) mortar

CD-35 was a Type C escort ship (Kaibōkan) of the Imperial Japanese Navy during the Second World War.

== History ==
CD-35 was laid down by Nippon Kokan K. K. at their Tsurumi Shipyard on 5 May 1944, launched on 3 September 1944, and completed and commissioned on 11 October 1944. During the war CD-35 was mostly busy on escort duties.

On 12 January 1945, off Cape Paderan in the South China Sea (11°10′N 108°55′E), CD-35 was attacked and sunk after receiving three direct bomb hits by aircraft operating from the aircraft carriers USS Lexington, USS Hancock and USS Hornet which were then part of Vice Admiral John S. McCain, Sr.'s Task Force 38 that had entered the South China Sea to raid Japanese shipping. 69 crewman were killed.

CD-35 was struck from the Navy List on 10 March 1945.

== Additional sources ==
- "Escort Vessels of the Imperial Japanese Navy special issue". Ships of the World (in Japanese). Vol. 45. Kaijinsha. February 1996.
- Model Art Extra No.340, Drawings of Imperial Japanese Naval Vessels Part-1 (in Japanese). Model Art Co. Ltd. October 1989.
- The Maru Special, Japanese Naval Vessels No.49, Japanese submarine chasers and patrol boats (in Japanese). Ushio Shobō. March 1981.
