= Mark 27 =

Mark 27 may refer to:

- Mark 27, a variant of the 3-inch/50-caliber gun
- Mark 27 torpedo, 1940s United States Navy submarine-launched torpedo
- Mark 27 nuclear bomb, 1950s United States nuclear weapon design
- MK 27, a variant of the Medium Tactical Vehicle Replacement
- MK 27, a variant of the Glock 19 adopted by the US military
