= List of escort vessel classes of World War II =

During World War II, the navies of both the Allies and the Axis powers built and operated hundreds of relatively small warships for the purpose of ensuring the safety of merchant convoys. These warships displaced around 1,000 tons and were typically armed with one-to-three guns of three-to-five inches in caliber, numerous smaller anti-aircraft guns and depth charge throwers.

== Summary ==
Country	Number of escort vessels
United States	1119
United Kingdom	650
Japan	187
Italy	49
Germany	10
Romania	1

== Allied escort vessel classes ==
=== United States (destroyer escorts and frigates and patrol craft) ===
- Evarts-class destroyer escort - 97 built
- Buckley-class destroyer escort - 148 built
- Cannon-class destroyer escort - 72 built
- Edsall-class destroyer escort - 85 built
- Rudderow-class destroyer escort - 22 built
- John C. Butler-class destroyer escort - 83 completed
- Tacoma-class frigate - 96 built
- PC-461 class submarine chaser - 343 built
- PCE-842 class patrol craft escort - 68 built

=== United Kingdom (frigates, sloops, corvettes and escort destroyers) ===
- Black Swan-class sloop – 12 (original) + 25 (modified)
- River-class frigate – 151 built
- Loch-class frigate – 26 built (4 more completed after the end of the war)
- Bay-class frigate – 7 built (23 more completed after the end of the war)
- Flower-class corvette – 294 built
- Castle-class corvette – 49 built
- Hunt-class destroyer – 86 built

== Axis escort vessel classes ==
=== Japan (Kaibōkan) ===
- Shimushu-class escort ship – 4 built
- Etorofu-class escort ship – 14 built
- Mikura-class escort ship – 8 built
- Hiburi-class escort ship – 9 built
- Ukuru-class escort ship – 29 built
- Type C escort ship – 56 built
- Type D escort ship – 67 built

=== Italy ===
- Gabbiano-class corvette - 49 built

=== Germany (Flottenbegleiter) ===
- F-class escort ship - 10 built

=== Romania ===
- Amiral Murgescu
