= Japanese escort ship CD-207 =

History

Japan
- Name: CD-207
- Builder: Naniwa Dock Co., Ltd., Osaka
- Laid down: 17 May 1944
- Launched: 22 August 1944
- Completed: 15 October 1944
- Commissioned: 25 November 1944
- Decommissioned: 1 December 1945
- Fate: Ceded to the USA, 4 July 1947 sunk as target, 13 August 1947

General characteristics
- Class & type: Type C escort ship
- Displacement: 745 long tons (757 t) (standard)
- Length: 67.5 m (221 ft)
- Beam: 8.4 m (27 ft 7 in)
- Draught: 2.9 m (10 ft)
- Propulsion: Geared diesel engines; 1,900 hp (1,417 kW); 2 shafts
- Speed: 16.5 knots (30.6 km/h; 19.0 mph)
- Range: 6,500 nmi (12,000 km) at 14 kn (26 km/h; 16 mph)
- Complement: 136
- Sensors & processing systems: Type 22-Go radar; Type 93 sonar; Type 3 hydrophone
- Armament: As built : 2 × 120 mm (4.7 in)/45 cal DP guns; 6 × Type 96 Type 96 25 mm (0.98 in) AA machine guns (2×3); 12 × Type 3 depth charge throwers; 1 × depth charge chute; 120 × depth charges; From 1944 : as above, plus; 1 × 81 mm (3.2 in) mortar

CD-207 was a C Type class escort ship (Kaibōkan) of the Imperial Japanese Navy during the Second World War.

== History ==
She was laid down by the Naniwa Dock Company at Osaka on 17 May 1944, launched on 22 August 1944, completed on 15 October 1944, and commissioned on 25 November 1944.

During the war CD-207 was mostly busy on escort duties. On 18 June 1945, in Toyama Bay, the submarine USS Bonefish (SS-223) was sunk by the combined efforts of the escort ships Okinawa, CD-207, CD-158, CD-75, and CD-63.

After the surrender of Japan on 15 August 1945, CD-207 was demilitarized (stripped of all her offensive weapons) and under Allied direction served as a transport ship repatriating Japanese troops and civilians from 1 December 1945 until the end of 1946. On 4 July 1947 she was ceded to the US as a war reparation and sunk as a target on 13 August 1947 at 35-20N, 122-41E.
