= Japanese escort ship Okinawa =

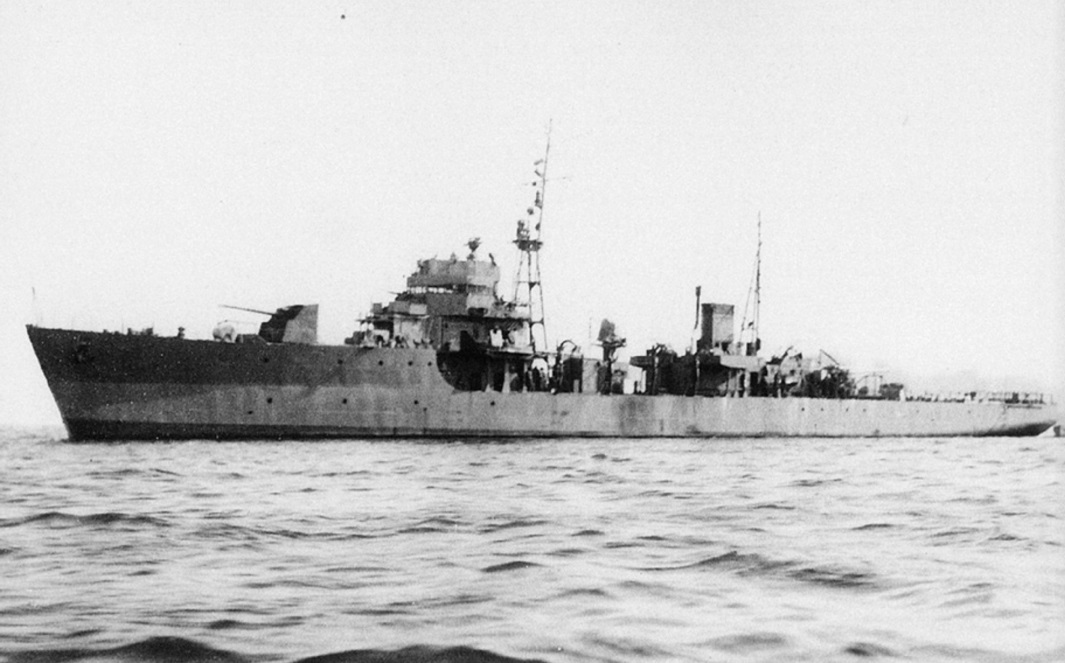
- An Ukuru class kaibōkan, the Uku, seen here in 1944. Okinawa looked very similar.

History

Japan
- Builder: Nihon Kokan, Tsurumi (Japan)
- Laid down: 10 December 1943
- Launched: 19 June 1944
- Stricken: 15 September 1945
- Fate: Sunk by aircraft on 30 July 1945
- Notes: Refloated after the war and scrapped in September 1948

General characteristics
- Displacement: 940 tons
- Length: 78,8 meters
- Beam: 9 meters
- Draught: 3 meters
- Propulsion: diesels, 4200 bhp
- Speed: 19,5 knots
- Complement: 150
- Armament: 3 × 120 mm (4.7 in)/45; 6 × 25mm Type 96 AA guns; depth charges

Okinawa was an escort ship ("Kaibōkan") of the Imperial Japanese Navy during the Second World War. She belonged to the Ukuru class. The ship is most notable for its possible participation in the sinkings of two submarines.

== Design and building ==
The Ukuru class escorts were very similar to the preceding Mikuru class. The main difference was a simplified hull form which enabled a shorter building time. Okinawa was built by the Nihon Kokan shipyard at Tsurumi. The building started on 10 December 1943 and some 8 months later the ship was completed. She was named after the island of Okinawa.

== In service ==
During her career Okinawa spent most of the time escorting various ships in convoys. In November 1944 she participated in the Japanese Operation TA, the reinforcement of Leyte, by escorting troop transports. In December of the same year, Okinawa escorted the carrier Kaiyo.

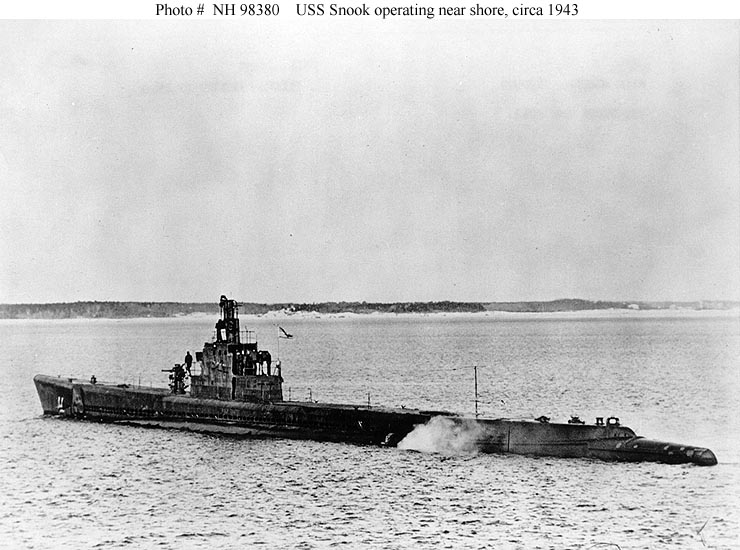
USS Snook (SS-279) in 1943

On 14 April 1945, Okinawa together with the escorts CD-8 and CD-32 attacked a submerged submarine with depth charges. Some sources mention the possibility that the submarine USS Snook was sunk in that attack, although the official cause for the loss of Snook remains unknown.

On 27 May 1945, Okinawa and the escort ship Aguni were attacked by American aircraft in the Korea Strait. Okinawa was not damaged but Aguni suffered heavy damage from a radar-guided glide bomb. After that Okinawa returned to escort duties.

On 19 June 1945 the cargo ship Konzan Maru was torpedoed and sunk by the submarine USS Bonefish. Okinawa, the escorts CD-63 and CD-207 counter-attacked the submarine with numerous depth charges until wood chips and oil were observed. The submarine was sunk with all hands.

On 30 July 1945 Okinawa was sunk by carrier aircraft near Maizuru, though which carrier is disputed: aircraft from USS Independence and the British Pacific Fleet claim the sinking.
