= USS Bonefish (SS-223) =

Submarine of the United States

Coordinates: 37°18′N 137°55′E

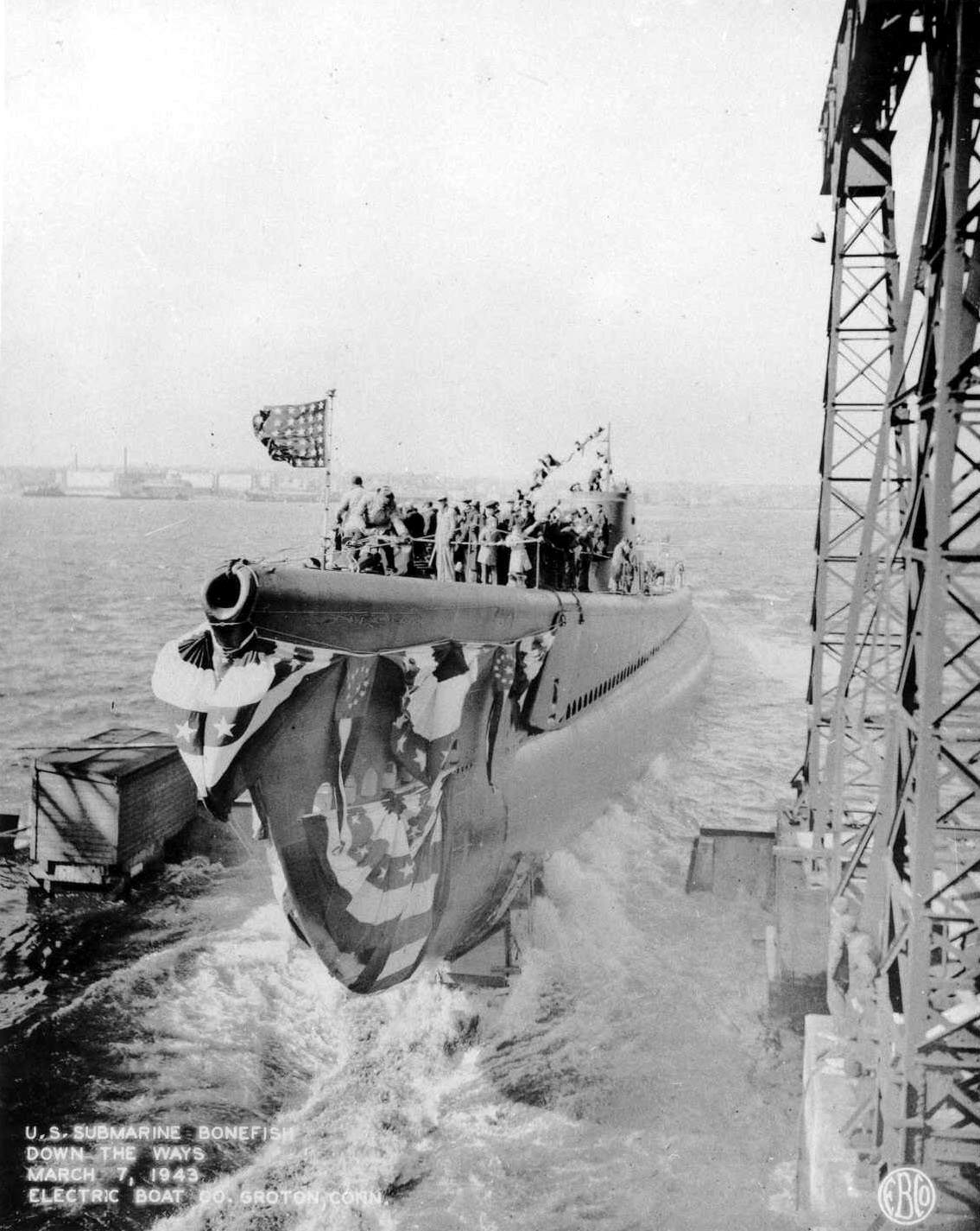
- USS Bonefish launching

History

United States
- Builder: Electric Boat Company, Groton, Connecticut
- Laid down: 25 June 1942
- Launched: 7 March 1943
- Sponsored by: Mrs. F. A. Daubin
- Commissioned: 31 May 1943
- Fate: Sunk by Japanese vessels in Toyama Bay, Honshū, 18 June 1945

General characteristics
- Class & type: Gato-class diesel-electric submarine
- Displacement: 1,525 long tons (1,549 t) surfaced; 2,424 long tons (2,463 t) submerged
- Length: 311 ft 9 in (95.02 m)
- Beam: 27 ft 3 in (8.31 m)
- Draft: 17 ft (5.2 m) maximum
- Propulsion: 4 × General Motors Model 16-248 V16 Diesel engines driving electric generators; 2 × 126-cell Sargo batteries; 4 × high-speed General Electric electric motors with reduction gears; two propellers; 5,400 shp (4.0 MW) surfaced; 2,740 shp (2.0 MW) submerged
- Speed: 21 knots (39 km/h) surfaced; 9 kn (17 km/h) submerged
- Range: 11,000 nautical miles (20,000 km) surfaced at 10 kn (19 km/h)
- Endurance: 48 hours at 2 kn (3.7 km/h) submerged; 75 days on patrol
- Test depth: 300 ft (90 m)
- Complement: 6 officers, 54 enlisted
- Armament: 10 × 21-inch (533 mm) torpedo tubes; 6 forward, 4 aft; 24 torpedoes; 1 × 4-inch (102 mm) / 50 caliber deck gun; Bofors 40 mm and Oerlikon 20 mm cannon

USS Bonefish (SS-223) was a Gato-class submarine, the first United States Navy ship to be named for the bonefish.

She had a busy career in the Pacific against Japanese shipping after being launched and commissioned in May 1943. She was sunk in June 1945 after sinking a ship on her eighth cruise.

== Operational history ==
Bonefish's keel was laid down by the Electric Boat Company of Groton, Connecticut on 25 June 1942. She was launched 7 May 1943 (sponsored by Mrs. Elizabeth S. Daubin, wife of Rear Admiral Freeland A. Daubin), and commissioned on 31 May 1943.

The submarine conducted shakedown training out of New London, Conn., and Newport, R.I., until 23 July, when she set out for the Pacific. She transited the Panama Canal on 4 August and arrived at Brisbane, Australia, on the 30th. Following a week of training out of that port, she again got underway for more days of drills in Moreton Bay. The submarine departed there on 16 September for her first war patrol.

=== First patrol, September – October 1943 ===
After transiting Balabac Strait on 22 September, Bonefish continued on to her patrol area in the central part of the South China Sea. Three days later, the submarine attacked a convoy of eight ships, scoring three hits on a freighter before the escorts forced her to go deep to avoid a depth charge attack. Bonefish encountered another convoy on 27 September and launched four torpedoes at the lead ship, the largest of the five, and sank the 9,908 ton transport Kashima Maru and damaged the Chihaya Maru. The escort ships pursued Bonefish, but she was able to dive and elude her attackers. On 6 October, the boat approached a third convoy and scored hits on two heavily laden cargo vessels. Again forced to go deep to avoid the counterattack, she failed to evaluate the damage that her torpedoes had done to the targets. On 10 October, in her last action of the patrol, Bonefish fired a spread of four torpedoes at two ships of a convoy off Indochina, sending both the 4,212 ton cargo ship Isuzugawa and the 10,086 ton transport Teibi Maru to the bottom. On 14 October the Bonefish sank a Japanese sailing vessel in the Makassar Strait. Bonefish concluded her first war patrol back at Fremantle, Western Australia, on 21 October.

=== Second patrol, November – December 1943 ===
After refit and training, the submarine got underway on 22 November for the South China Sea and her second war patrol. She entered the Flores Sea on 28 November and, the next day, intercepted two enemy ships. Bonefish made a submerged approach and launched four torpedoes. Two of the four — one hit amidships and another struck the freighter under her mainmast — sent the 4,646 ton cargo ship Suez Maru down rapidly by the stern. The escort increased speed and headed for Bonefish, but the sub went deep and escaped the barrage of depth charges. Unknown to Bonefish, Suez Maru was carrying 414 British and 133 Dutch POWs. Minesweeper W.12 picked up the Japanese survivors although recently released documents state that W.12 machine-gunned the surviving POWs (a minimum of 250) in the water,

On 1 December, the boat sighted a convoy of three ships with two escorts hugging the Celebes coast. In two separate attacks, the submarine scored a hit on a large passenger/cargo ship Nichiryo Maru which later sank and another on a destroyer escort which apparently survived.

Bonefish conducted a submerged patrol of Sandakan Harbor, Borneo, from 4 – 6 December and then sailed for Tarakan. On 11 December, she surfaced to engage small cargo vessel Toyohime Maru with gunfire, scoring several hits before a mechanical problem put her gun out of action. The next day, the boat made a submerged approach on an unidentified Japanese vessel and fired six torpedoes, scoring one hit; Bonefish never learned the fate of her target. She cleared the area and arrived at Fremantle on 19 December.

=== Third patrol, January – March 1944 ===
Following refit and training, the submarine sailed from Fremantle on 12 January 1944 to conduct her third war patrol. While operating in the vicinity of Makassar Strait on 22 January, Bonefish encountered a large sailing vessel. The stranger's crew of seven acted suspiciously as the submarine approached, and despite repeated orders to do so, the crew refused to abandon ship. When Bonefish opened fire with her machine guns, the natives leaped overboard. As the vessel began to sink, Japanese troops emerged from below decks; Bonefish counted 39 men going over the side.

On 6 February, the submarine sighted a convoy composed of at least 17 ships. As she maneuvered into attack position, Bonefish selected a large oiler as her primary target and launched four bow "fish" at it. She fired the other two bow tubes at a cargo ship and then tried to swing her stern into position to fire her after tubes. With escorts charging her, the boat suddenly lost depth control and ducked her periscope below the water. Nine tons of water rushed into her forward torpedo room before the proper valves were secured. Bonefish managed to evade the escorts, and her crew heard explosions which they interpreted as at least two hits on the oiler and one on the cargo ship. Nevertheless, it seems that neither target sank.

The submarine next trained her torpedo tubes on a convoy of 13 ships which she contacted on 9 February in Camranh Bay. Although detected by a Japanese destroyer, Bonefish succeeded in firing five torpedoes at the ex-whale-factory tanker Tonan Maru No. 2 before making an emergency dive in shallow water. The submarine escaped damage from both the destroyer's depth charges and from aerial bombs which enemy aircraft dropped, but they prevented her from observing the results of her attack. (The Tonan Maru was hit but quickly repaired.) Following this action, she continued to seek targets for more than a month before returning to Fremantle on 15 March.

=== Fourth patrol, April – May 1944 ===
Underway again on 13 April, Bonefish headed for the Celebes Sea and her fourth war patrol. On 26 April, she intercepted a convoy of four ships steaming along the Mindanao coast. The submarine maneuvered into a position suitable to attack Tokiwa Maru, launched four torpedoes, and then turned to evade the escorts. Two torpedoes struck the 806 ton passenger/cargo ship amidships and aft, sinking her. The next day, Bonefish fired a spread of four torpedoes at a cargo ship headed for Davao Gulf but, in spite of three hits, failed to sink the target.

While in the Sulu Sea on 3 May, Bonefish approached a convoy but was forced to dive when an enemy plane dropped two depth bombs which exploded close aboard. The boat sustained minor damage and surfaced to make repairs, but two Japanese ships began to close in on her. Bonefish went deep once again and rigged for the depth charges, 25 in all. When her pursuers left the area, so did Bonefish. She moved to the northern approach to Basilan Strait. She attacked a convoy in those waters on 7 May, firing four torpedoes at an escort vessel, but could not observe the results.

On 14 May, Bonefish approached a convoy of three tankers and three escorting destroyers, steaming off Tawitawi in the Philippines and headed for Sibutu Passage. The submarine fired five torpedoes. One hit under the bridge of a tanker and another struck under the stack, enveloping the ship in smoke and flames. The destroyers converged on Bonefish for counterattack, but she escaped into the depths. Postwar records show that, while her torpedoes only damaged the tanker, they sank one of the escorting destroyers, Inazuma, which was known for having rescued 376 survivors from HMS Exeter and 151 from USS Pope during the Second Battle of the Java Sea.

Bonefish then set course for Sibutu Passage on a reconnaissance mission. She sighted a Japanese task force consisting of three battleships, one aircraft carrier, three heavy cruisers, and one light cruiser, screened by eight destroyers. The submarine relayed the information, then continued her reconnaissance. She again sighted and reported the same task force on the 17th, this time anchored in Tawitawi Bay. Upon completing this mission, she headed for Australia and arrived at Fremantle on 30 May.

=== Fifth patrol, June – August 1944 ===
Under the command of Lt. Cmdr. Lawrence L. Edge, the submarine began her fifth war patrol on 25 June and headed again for the Celebes Sea. On 6 July, she surfaced to destroy a wooden-hulled schooner by gunfire. She then cleared the area and, the next day, engaged and destroyed another small ship with gunfire. Later that same day, the boat fired eight torpedoes at a small cargo ship, scoring several hits. On 8 July, she used her guns to touch off a blazing fire in a small, inter-island steamer and, two days later, sank a sampan with gunfire.

On 29 July, Bonefish commenced tracking a large, but empty, tanker with escorts and, early the next morning, gained a favorable attack position. She fired six torpedoes and scored four hits. The target, Kokuyo Maru, immediately settled by the stern, and Bonefish headed for the traffic lanes north of Sibutu and Tawitawi. On 3 August, she damaged a tanker with one torpedo hit. She set course for Fremantle the next day, ending her patrol there on 13 August.

=== Sixth patrol, September – October 1944 ===
With her crew refreshed and her provisions and ammunition replenished, Bonefish got underway on 5 September for the Sibuyan Sea. After three days there without encountering any enemy ships, she departed those waters on 24 September. Four days later, while patrolling off Mindoro, the submarine sighted a large, heavily laden tanker escorted by two destroyers. She fired all of her bow torpedoes and heard and felt the hits on the 2,068 ton Japanese ship Anjo Maru. Bonefish tracked the target whose rapidly falling speed indicated her distress until the crippled tanker's escorts forced the boat to retire. A postwar examination of Japanese records confirmed that Anio Maru sank later that day.

During the later part of this patrol, Bonefish joined Flasher (SS-249) and Lapon (SS-260) in forming a coordinated attack group. Patrolling in the vicinity of Cape Bolinao on 10 October, the boats attacked a convoy of cargo ships, and Bonefish scored three hits for undetermined damage. Four days later, while en route to a lifeguard station, she sank cargo ship Fushimi Maru. On 18 October, the submarine rescued two naval aviators. She departed her lifeguard station the next day, stopped at Saipan for fuel on the 27th, and continued on to Pearl Harbor, where she arrived on 8 November.

From Hawaii, Bonefish continued on to San Francisco, California, where she underwent overhaul at the Bethlehem Steel Submarine Repair Basin from 18 November 1944 to 13 February 1945. Then, after refresher training off Monterey, Calif., she returned to Pearl Harbor where she conducted exercises until 20 March.

=== Seventh patrol, March – May 1945 ===
Bonefish then set sail via Guam for the East China Sea and her seventh war patrol. Despite thorough coverage of the waters assigned her, she made few contacts and each of these was a small antisubmarine vessel. On Friday, 13 April, she attempted to sink a patrol vessel, but the target's radical maneuvers enabled it to escape. While on lifeguard duty off Korea's southern coast on 16 April, Bonefish rescued two Japanese aviators who had been shot down by a Navy plane. The USS Bonefish then completed a "special mission". On 7 May, the submarine returned to Apra Harbor, Guam, ending another successful war patrol.

=== Eighth patrol, May – June 1945 ===
Upon completion of refit on 28 May, Bonefish got underway in company with Tunny (SS-282) and Skate (SS-305), as part of "Pierce's Pole Cats", commanded by Tunny's skipper, Commander George E. Pierce. Equipped with a new mine-detecting device, the submarines were ordered to penetrate the Sea of Japan to sever the last of the Japanese overseas supply lines. Bonefish successfully threaded her way through the minefields by Tsushima Island as she transited the Korea Strait to enter the Sea of Japan for an offensive patrol off the west central coast of Honshū.

During a rendezvous with Tunny on 16 June, Bonefish reported sinking Oshikayama Maru, a 6,892 ton cargo ship. In a second rendezvous two days later, she requested and received permission to conduct a daylight submerged patrol of Toyama Bay, a bay farther up the Honshū coast. The attack group was to depart the Sea of Japan via La Perouse Strait on the night of 24 June. Bonefish did not make the scheduled pre-transit rendezvous. Still, Tunny waited in vain off Hokkaidō for three days. On 30 July, Bonefish was presumed lost.

Japanese records reveal that the 5,488 ton cargo ship Konzan Maru was torpedoed and sunk in Toyama Wan on 18 June and that an ensuing severe counterattack by Japanese escorts, the Okinawa, CD-63, CD-75, CD-158 and CD-207, brought debris and a major oil slick to the water's surface. There can be little doubt that Bonefish was sunk in this action. She was the second to last United States Submarine lost in the war, with Bullhead (SS-332) being lost in August 1945.

== Wreck ==
On 24 March 2026, Tiburon Subsea CEO Tim Taylor and the Lost 52 Project announced that the wreck of Bonefish had been discovered during surveys in 2025.

== Awards ==
- Navy Unit Commendation – five awards, for her first, third, fourth, fifth, and sixth war patrols
- Asiatic-Pacific Campaign Medal with seven battle stars for World War II service
- World War II Victory Medal

== See also ==
- List of U.S. Navy losses in World War II
