= Mark 27 torpedo =

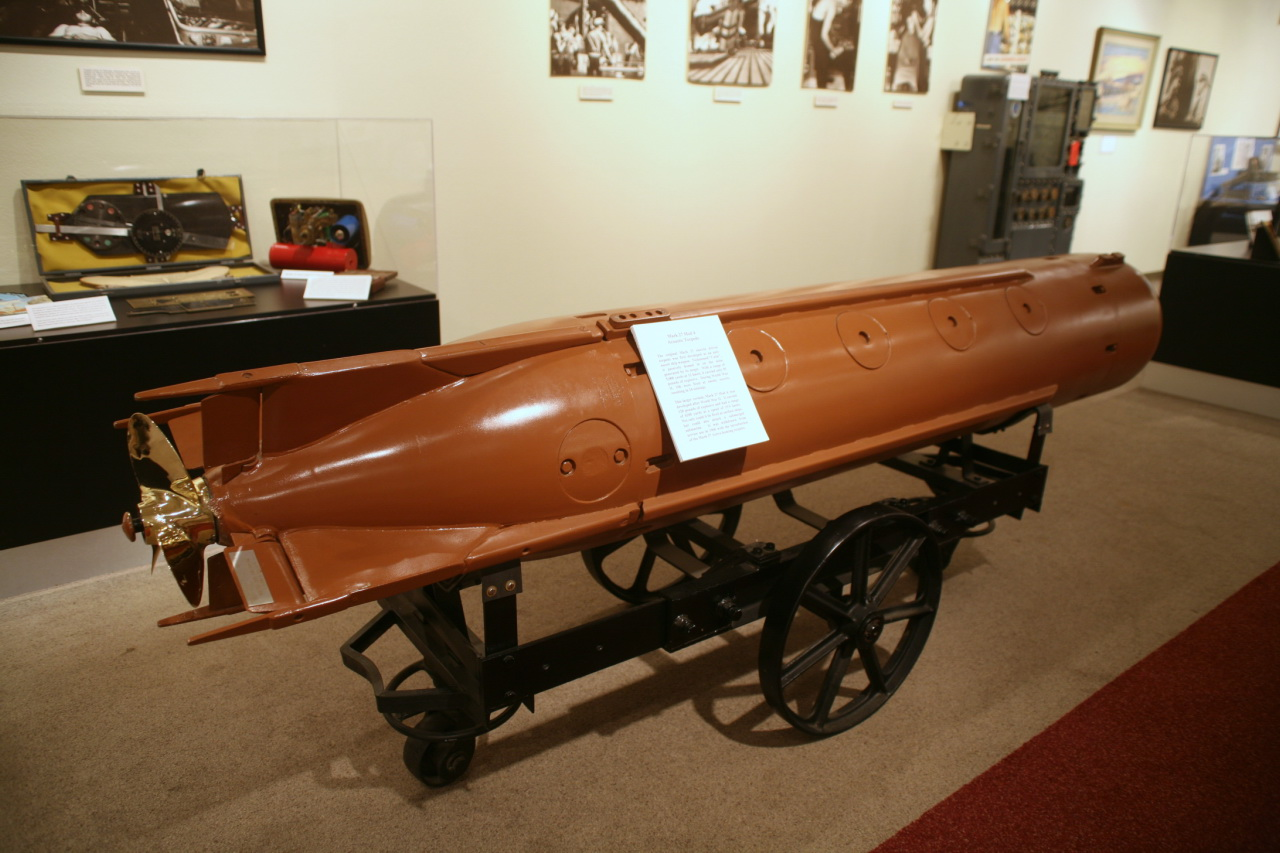
- Type: Acoustic torpedo
- Place of origin: United States

Service history
- In service: 1943-1960
- Used by: United States Navy
- Wars: World War II

Production history
- Designer: Bell Telephone Laboratories
- Designed: 1943
- Manufacturer: Western Electric
- No. built: 1000
- Variants: Mark 27 Mod 4

Specifications
- Mass: 720 pounds (330 kg)
- Length: 90 inches (2.3 m)
- Diameter: 19 inches (48 cm) (21-inch (53 cm) guide rails)
- Effective firing range: 5,000 yards (4.6 km) (approx. 12 minutes search duration)
- Warhead: Mk 27 Mod 0
- Detonation mechanism: Mk 11 Mod 2 contact exploder
- Engine: Electric
- Maximum speed: 12 knots (22 km/h)
- Guidance system: Gyroscope
- Launch platform: Submarines

The Mark 27 torpedo was the first of the United States Navy 19-inch (48-cm) submarine-launched torpedoes. This electrically-propelled torpedo was 125 inches (3.175 m) long and weighed 1174 pounds (534 kg). The torpedo employed a passive acoustic guidance system and was intended for both submarine and surface targets. Nicknamed "Cutie" by submarine crews, the Mark 27 entered service in 1943 as a defensive weapon. The torpedo was classified as obsolete in the 1960s.

The Mark 27 was essentially a Mark 24 mine which had been modified for submarine launching in a 21-inch (53 cm) submerged torpedo tube by the addition of 1" (25 mm) wooden guide studs mounted on the torpedo's outer shell.

== Modifications and improvements ==
Mark 27 Mod 4 torpedo
- Type: Acoustic torpedo
- Place of origin: United States

Service history
- In service: 1946-1960
- Used by: United States Navy

Production history
- Designer: Ordnance Research Laboratory, Pennsylvania State University
- Designed: 1946
- Manufacturer: Avco; Naval Ordnance Station Forest Park
- Produced: 1946-1954
- No. built: 3000

Specifications
- Mass: 1,175 pounds (533 kg)
- Length: 125.75 inches (3.194 m)
- Diameter: 19 inches (48 cm) (with 21-inch (53 cm) guide rails)
- Effective firing range: 6,200 yards (5.7 km) (12 minutes search duration)
- Warhead: Mk 27 Mod 2, HBX
- Warhead weight: 128 pounds (58 kg)
- Detonation mechanism: Mk 11 Mod 2 contact exploder
- Engine: Electric
- Maximum speed: 15.9 knots (29.4 km/h)
- Guidance system: Gyroscope
- Launch platform: Submarines

The Mark 27 Mod 4 torpedo was designed by the Ordnance Research Laboratory of Pennsylvania State University in 1946 as an improved version of the Mark 27 torpedo.

Fully compatible with electrical setting fire control systems through the use of the standard 65-pin umbilical cable, this weapon was in service on submarines for about ten years. It was withdrawn from service use in 1960 with the introduction of the Mark 37 torpedo.

== See also ==
- Mark 24 mine
