= Kaibōkan =

Classification of Japanese naval vessel

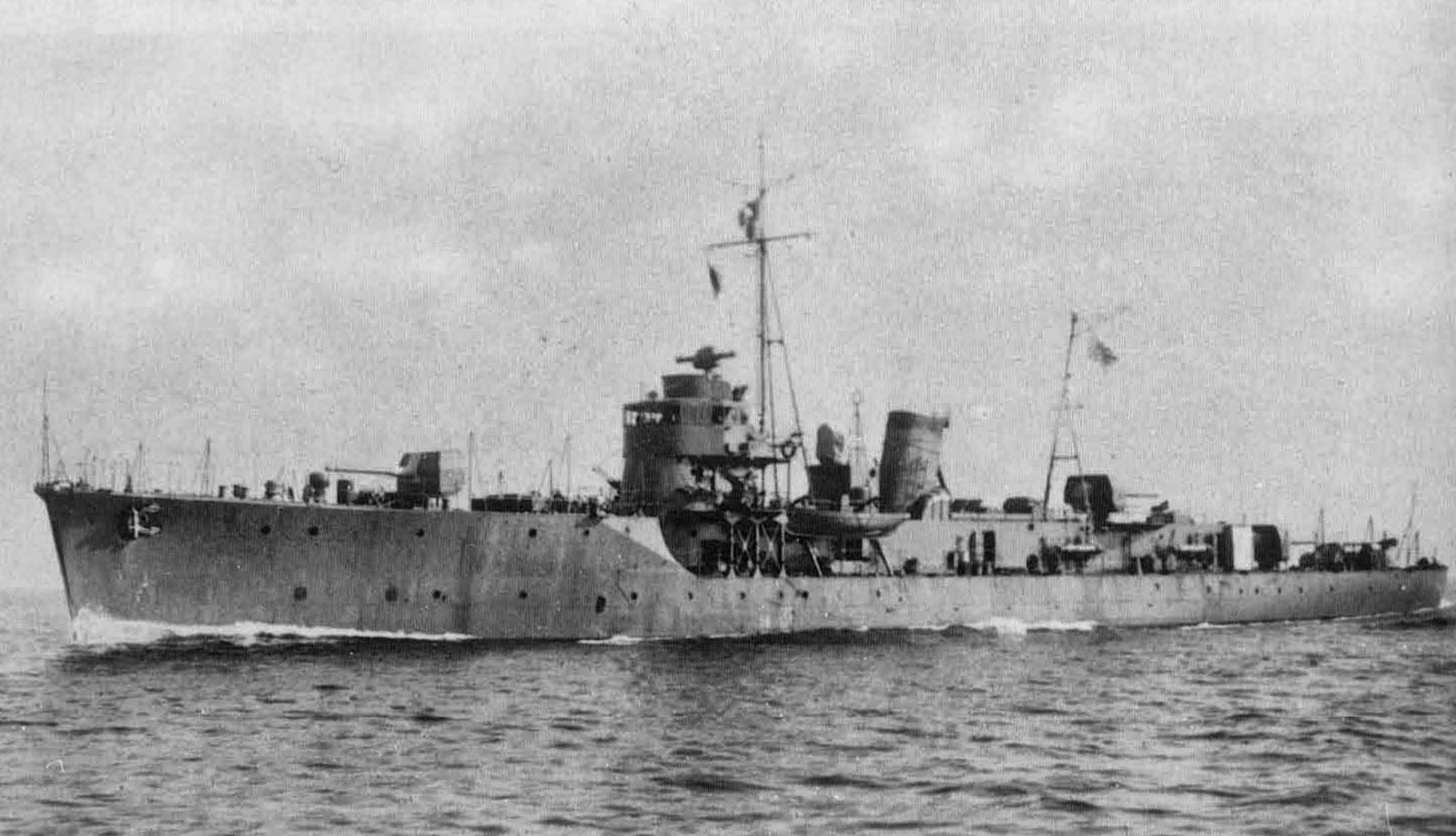
The Japanese Etorofu in May 1943.

Kaibōkan (海防艦; "sea defence ship") or coastal defense ship (Note: Common alternative English translation of kaibōkan. Not to be confused with "coastal defense ships" of other smaller navies, such as monitors with 12+ inch guns, which fulfilled different roles.) was a type of naval ship used by the Imperial Japanese Navy during World War II for escort duty and coastal defense. The term escort ship was used by the United States Navy to describe this category of Japanese ships.

== Description ==
These ships were the Japanese equivalent to Allied destroyer escorts and frigates, with all three types of warships being built as a less expensive anti-submarine warfare alternative to fleet destroyers. While similar, destroyer escorts of the US Navy played a slightly different role to that of kaibōkan within the IJN, namely being that kaibōkan were diesel engine ships that never carried torpedo tubes, while many examples of Allied destroyer escort classes featured boiler and turbine machinery, and carried torpedoes; as a result of these design differences, kaibōkan often proved inferior to Allied destroyer escorts when undertaking escort roles. The kaibokans' lack of such features rendered them more comparable to Matsu-class destroyers, which the IJN considered to be "Type D destroyers" (丁型駆逐艦), (Note: As opposed to Type A (Kagerō-class, Yūgumo-class), Type B (Akizuki-class), and Type C (Shimakaze-class) destroyers which more resembled US destroyers in role.) envisioned as general escorts with less firepower and speed.

Kaibōkan had some counterparts among Japan's Axis allies: the 10 Kriegsmarine escort ships of the F-class, and Amiral Murgescu of the Romanian Navy.

In the course of the war, the design was simplified and scaled down to permit larger numbers of vessels to be built more quickly.

=== Old definition ===
Before the onset of World War II, kaibōkan was the catchall name for various ships, from battleships to sloops, which had become obsolete. For example, the battleship Mikasa was reclassified as a Kaibokan 1st class in 1921, after 19 years from her commissioning.

== Classes ==
Ships of the first four classes were all named after Japanese islands.

=== Shimushu class (Ishigaki) ===
- Also known as Type A – multi purpose patrol, escorts or minesweeper.
- Main Engine: Diesel X 2, double shaft (3,100 kW (4,200 shp))
- Max Speed: 36.5 km/h (19.7 kn)
- Range: 15,000 kilometres (8,000 nmi) (30 km/h (16 kn))
- Fuel: Oil X 120t

=== Etorofu class (Matsuwa) ===
- Modified Type A
- Main Engine: Diesel X 2, double shaft (3,100 kW (4,200 shp))
- Max Speed: 36.5 km/h (19.7 kn)
- Range: 15,000 kilometres (8,000 nmi) (30 km/h (16 kn))
- Fuel: Oil X 120t

=== Mikura class (Chiburi) ===
- Also known as Type B
- Main Engine: Diesel X 2, double shaft (3,100 kW (4,200 shp))
- Max Speed: 36.1 km/h (19.5 kn)
- Range: 11,000 kilometres (6,000 nmi) (30 km/h (16 kn))
- Fuel: Oil X 120t

=== Ukuru class (Okinawa) ===
- Modified Type B
- Main Engine: Diesel X 2, double shaft (3,100 kW (4,200 shp))
- Max Speed: 36.1 km/h (19.5 kn)
- Range: 10,656 kilometres (5,754 nmi) (30 km/h (16 kn))
- Fuel: Oil X 120t

=== Type C and Type D ===
Same design with different engines; diesels for Type C and turbines for Type D. More than 120 were mass-produced during the war, employing modular design method.

=== Others ===
In addition, two former Chinese light cruisers were used, renamed Ioshima and Yasoshima.

== See also ==
- Convoy Hi-81
- List of escort vessel classes of World War II
