= Convoy Hi-81 =

1944 Japanese transport formation and World War II battle

Battle of Convoy Hi-81
- Part of World War II, Pacific War
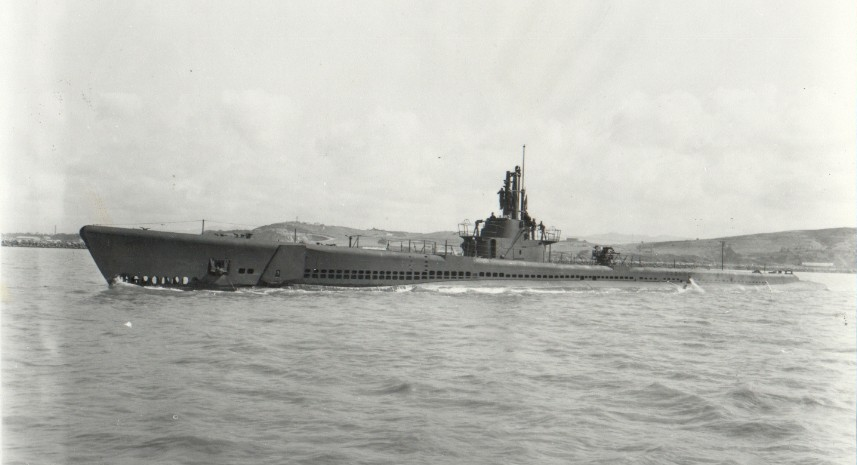
- Port side view of USS Spadefish in May 1944.
Date	November 15–18, 1944
Location	Yellow Sea
Result	United States victory

Belligerents
United States	Japan

Commanders and leaders
Gordon W. Underwood; Eugene B. Fluckey	(Empire of Japan) Tsutomu Sato (Empire of Japan) Shizue Ishii

Strength
Sea: 6 submarines Air: 1 B-29 bomber	Sea: 1 escort carrier 1 seaplane tender 1 destroyer 7 escort ships 1 submarine chaser 4 landing craft carriers 5 oilers Air: 27 B5N torpedo bombers

Casualties and losses
None	~6,600 killed 1 escort carrier sunk 1 submarine chaser sunk 2 landing craft carriers sunk

Convoy Hi-81 (ヒ-81) was the designation for a formation of Japanese transports that carried soldiers bound for Singapore and the Philippines during World War II. The transports were escorted by a large force of surface combatants including the escort carrier Shin'yō and the landing craft carrier Akitsu Maru which were sunk in the Yellow Sea by American submarines. Over the course of a four-day convoy battle in November 1944 nearly 7,000 Japanese were killed in action while the Americans sustained no casualties.

== Background ==
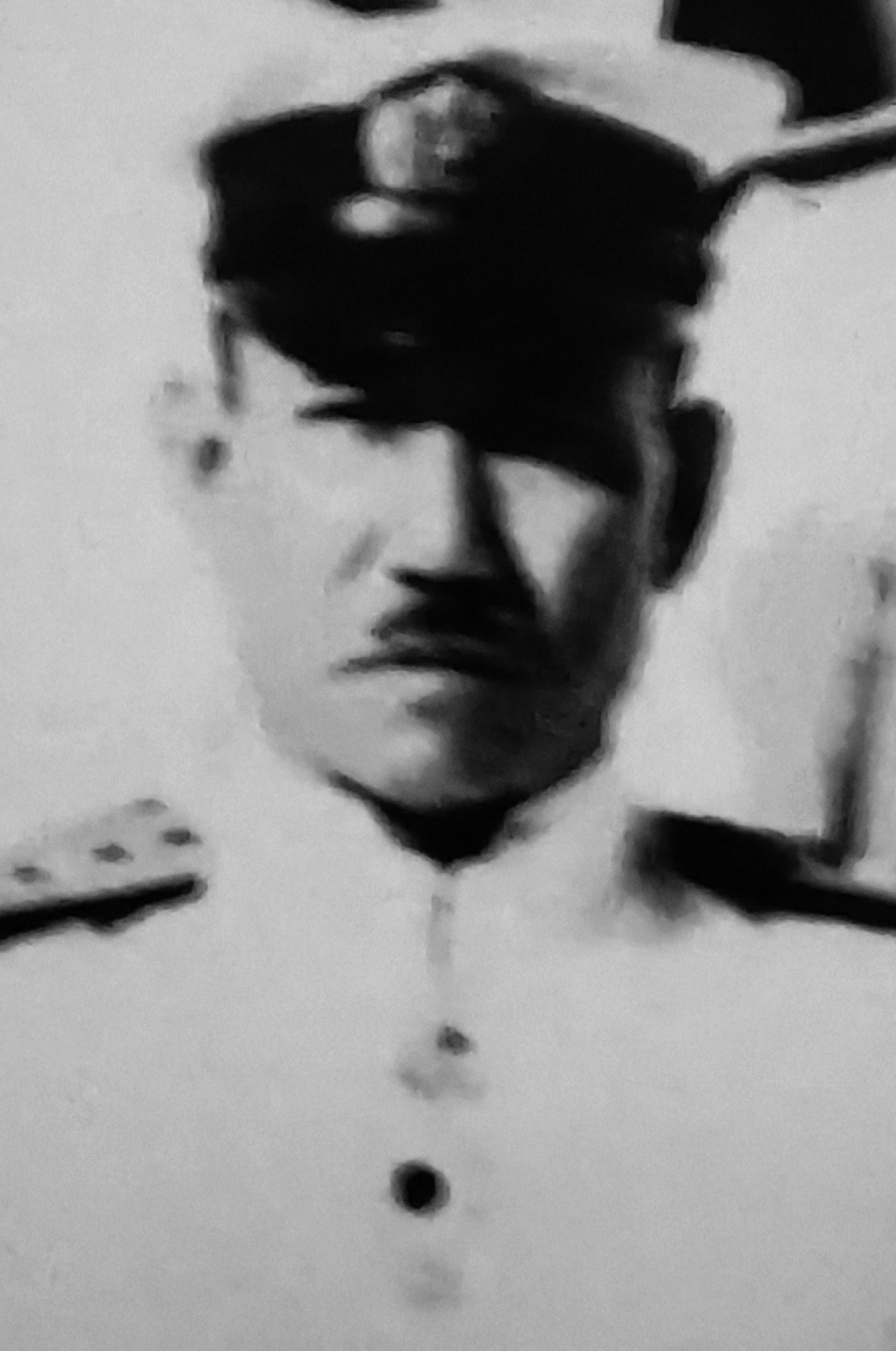
Captain Shizue Ishii

Convoy Hi-81 was under the command of Rear Admiral Tsutomu Sato of the Eighth Escort Fleet in the escort ship Etorofu. Shin'yō was commanded by Captain Shizue Ishii. The other Japanese vessels known to have taken part in the mission was the seaplane tender Kiyokawa Maru, the destroyer Kashi, the escort ships Tsushima, Daito, Kume, Shonan, CD No. 9 and CD No. 61. There was also the submarine chaser No. 156, five oilers, Arita Maru, Toa Maru, Hishidate Maru, Marii Maru, Otowasan Maru and four Army landing craft carriers, Shinshū Maru, Akitsu Maru, Mayasan Maru, and Kibitsu Maru. The landing craft carriers were carrying hundreds of men and supplies of the Imperial Japanese Army 23rd Division from Manchuria and were directed to separate from the main convoy at Mako and reinforce the Japanese army engaged in the Philippines Campaign, with Akitsu Maru also serving as an aircraft ferry in the convoy. The rest of the convoy would then continue on to Singapore.

== Battle of Convoy Hi-81 ==
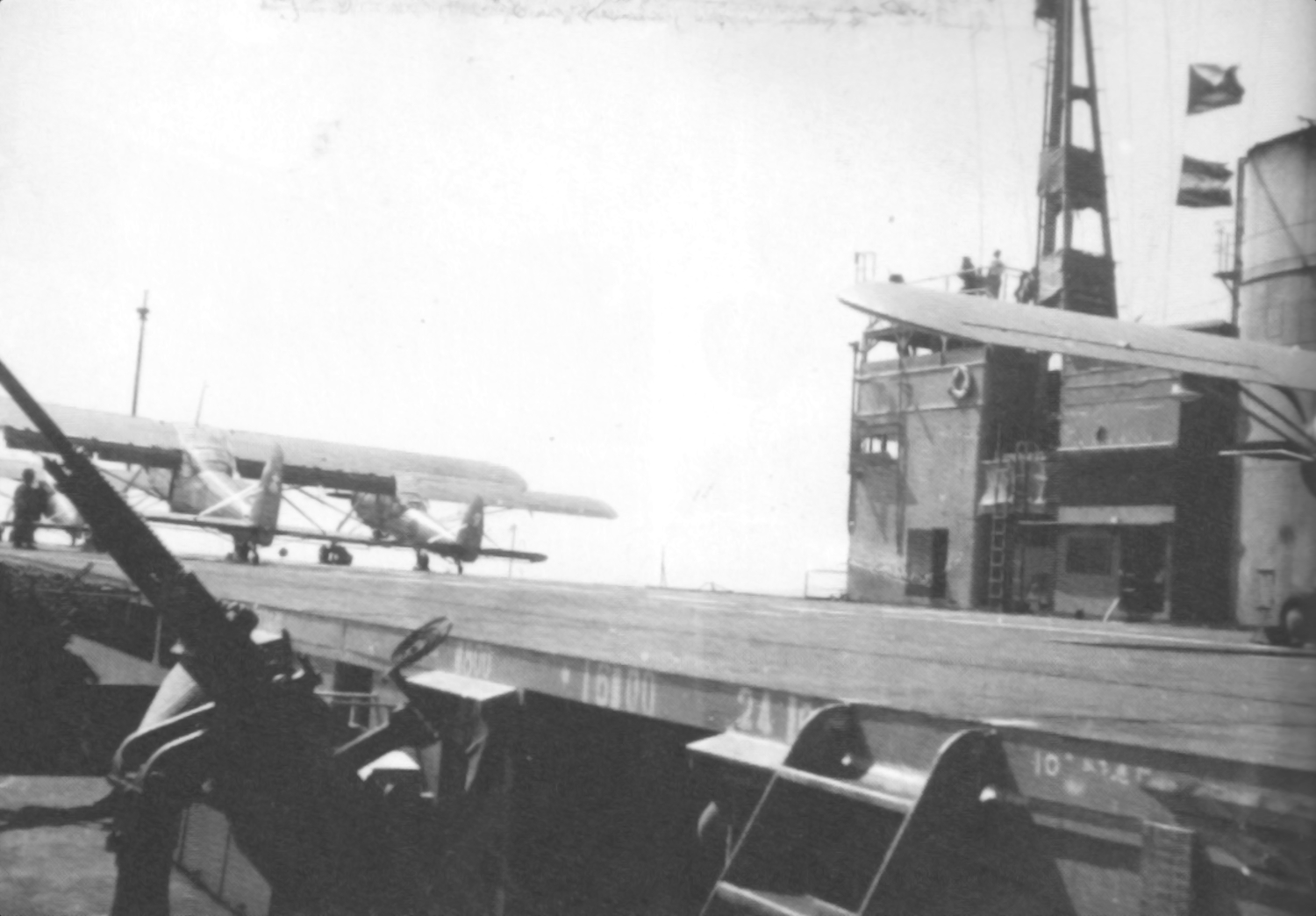
The flight deck of Akitsu Maru in 1944.

Convoy Hi-81 left Imari Bay, Japan on November 14, 1944. Rear Admiral Sato led his fleet southwest into the Yellow Sea so as to travel south along the occupied Chinese coast and then that of occupied French Indochina. After stopping for the night in Ukishima Channel, off the Gotō Islands, Hi-81 proceeded on but soon came under attack. United States Navy code breakers had informed Vice Admiral Charles A. Lockwood (Commander, Submarine, Pacific Fleet) of the convoy only a few days prior to November 14 and he sent two submarine "wolfpacks" to the Yellow Sea. One was under Commander Gordon W. Underwood and the other under Commander Charles E. Loughlin. Underwood's pack included his boat, the USS Spadefish, the Peto and the Sunfish. The other three submarines were Loughlin's Queenfish, the Picuda and Barb.

Commander Loughlin's pack was the first to make contact with the Japanese. At about 11:50 am on November 15, the Queenfish was lined up for a torpedo attack on the Akitsu Maru and six minutes later the ship was hit by two torpedoes. The torpedoes had hit aft and amidship on the port side, detonating the magazine and causing the vessel to keel over and sink in three minutes at position 33°17′N 32°00′E. The attack killed 2,046 men. In response, Captain Ishii launched some of his twenty-seven depth charge-equipped Nakajima B5N torpedo bombers to search for the Queenfish but she got away. The USS Barb, under Lieutenant Commander Eugene B. Fluckey, is credited with making an unsuccessful attack the same day on Junyo though she was not part of Convoy Hi-81 and was in company with three other ships, one a cruiser. Because of this some American accounts cite Junyo as having been sunk.

After the sinking of Akitsu Maru, on November 16, Rear Admiral Tsutomu headed for Strange Island off the coast of Korea to shelter there for the day. Meanwhile, at Moji, Convoy Mi-27 (ミ-27) left port with orders to catch up with Convoy Hi-81 and remain near it at all times. Mi-27 included five escorts and eight transports led by CD 134. None of these vessels would make it to the battle area in time. At 8:00 am on November 17, the Hi-81 proceeded on for the Shushan Islands near Shanghai.

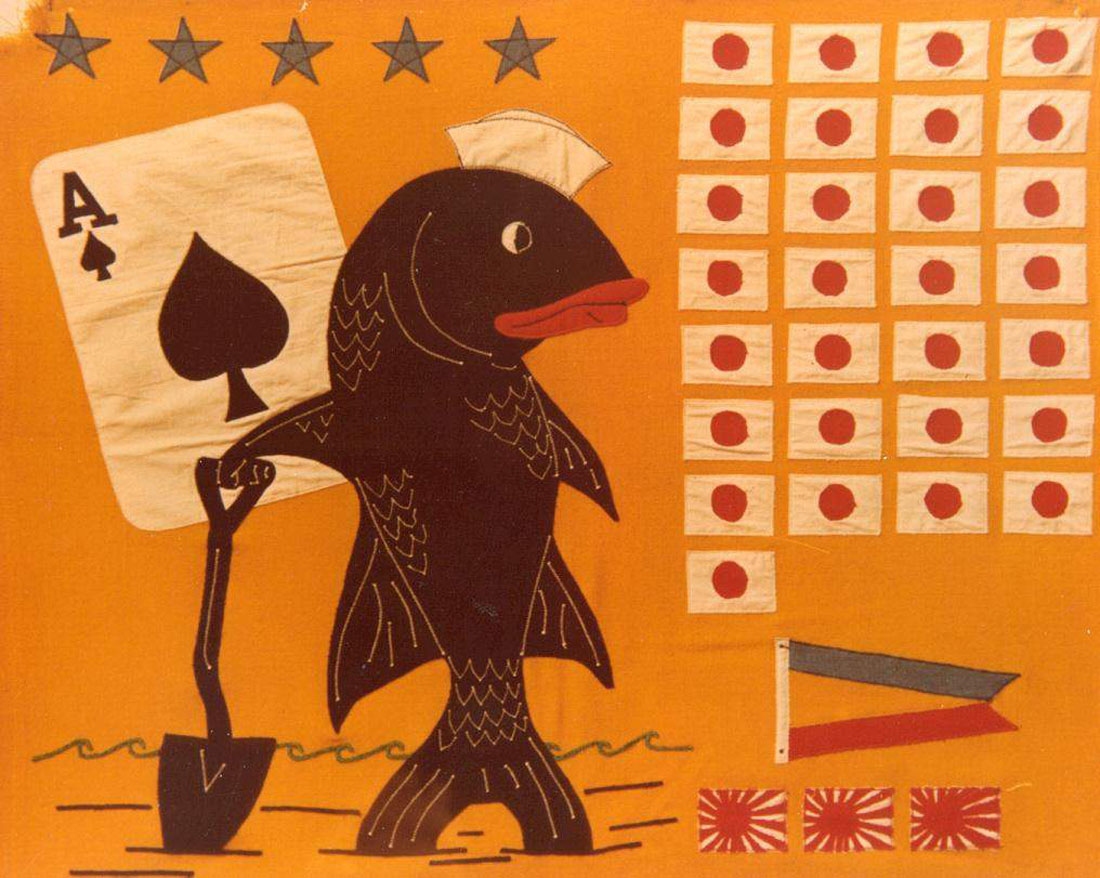
USS Spadefish's battle flag.

At 12:15 one American Boeing B-29 Superfortress was spotted at position 34°08′N 125°39′E. It dropped a bomb on the convoy but missed and the aircraft was chased away by torpedo bombers from the Shin'yō. The B-29 reported the convoy's position to command which helped coordinate submarine attacks. Several hours later at 4:15 pm the landing ship Mayasan Maru exploded directly in front of the Shin'yō just as Captain Ishii was landing his last air patrol for the day. It had been hit by at least one torpedo from USS Picuda. Mayasan Maru sank with a loss of 3,437 men killed, most of whom were soldiers. Almost twelve hours later 200 kilometers off Saishu Island, Spadefish surfaced and attacked the Shin'yō with six torpedoes. Four struck the carrier on the starboard at 11:03 pm, and it caught fire. At least 1,130 Japanese sailors went down with their ship; only about seventy survived, including Ishii. Kashi immediately dropped several depth charges where the Spadefish was thought to be. An oil slick and other debris eventually made the Japanese believe they had sunk Spadefish so the Kashi broke off the engagement, but Spadefish had escaped apparently without serious damage. Only minor cracks were reported to have appeared on the submarine after the alleged "sinking" by Kashi.

Commander Underwood surfaced an hour later for another attack and as soon as his ship was out of the water the submarine chaser No. 156 was spotted. Spadefish fired four torpedoes; three of them hit the little chaser and it was completely destroyed after the initial explosion with all hands. Commander Underwood then submerged again. The Japanese were unaware that the Shin'yō had been sunk and that men were in the water until sometime after 2:20 am on November 18 when the commander of Convoy Mi-27 ordered the CD 61 to locate and assist the Shin'yō. The Tsushima was also nearby and at 4:26 am her commander reported having sunk an enemy submarine with fifteen depth charges due to the sighting of an oil slick. It later proved to be an inconclusive contact. The Americans had sunk around 40,000 tons altogether.

== Aftermath ==
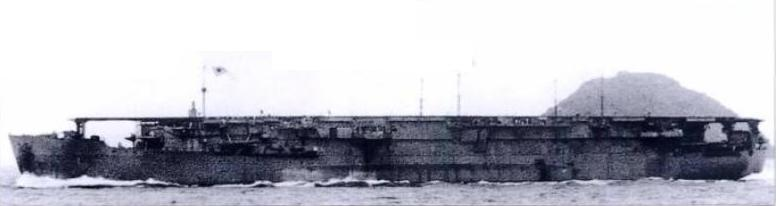
Shin'yō in November of 1943.

Due to the sinking of four ships and the loss of thousands of men, Admiral Sato stopped the convoy in Raffle's Island anchorage near Shanghai to wait for his escorts to finish their rescue operations. It was not until November 21 that the convoy headed for Mako, which they reached two days later. The Japanese fleet then split in two, one half sailing for Singapore and the other for Luzon. The larger portion, sent to the Philippines, arrived at Manila on December 2, and the remainder arrived in Singapore on December 4.

Another convoy, MI-27, was also attacked west of Jeju Island by Sunfish and Peto in the night between 17 and 18 November. Sunfish sank two troopships, Edogawa Maru with 2,113 killed, and Seisho Maru with 448 killed. Peto sank Osakasan Maru (142 killed) and Chinkai Maru (39 killed).

== List of Japanese ships and fate ==
Escort carrier

- Shin'yō, sunk - 1,130 killed

Seaplane tender

- Kiyokawa Maru

Destroyer

- Kashi

Escort ships

- Etorofu
- Tsushima
- Daito
- Kume
- Shonan
- CD No. 9
- CD No. 61

Submarine chaser

- No. 156, sunk - no survivors

Oilers

- Arita Maru
- Toa Maru
- Hishidate Maru
- Marii Maru
- Otowasan Maru

Landing craft carriers

- Shinshū Maru
- Akitsu Maru, sunk - 2,046 killed
- Mayasan Maru, sunk - 3,437 killed
- Kibitsu Maru
