= Japanese minesweeper W-101 =

1941–1945 Bangor-class ship

History

Empire of Japan
- Name: W-101
- Builder: Taikoo Dockyard and Engineering Company, Hong Kong
- Yard number: 101
- Laid down: 12 July 1941
- Launched: 20 February 1943
- Completed: 10 April 1944
- Acquired: seized by Imperial Japanese Navy, 25 December 1941
- Commissioned: 10 April 1944
- Stricken: 10 March 1945
- Home port: Sasebo
- Fate: Sunk by aircraft, 12 January 1945

General characteristics
- Type: Minesweeper
- Tonnage: 600 GRT
- Length: 54.86 m (180 ft 0 in) o/a
- Beam: 8.69 m (28 ft 6 in)
- Draught: 2.54 m (8 ft 4 in)
- Installed power: 2,200 hp (1,600 kW)
- Speed: 15.8 knots (29.3 km/h; 18.2 mph)
- Armament: 1 x 8 cm/40 3rd Year Type naval gun; 2 x Type 96 25 mm AT/AA Gun; 3 x Type 94 depth charge projectors

W-101 or No. 101 (Japanese: 第百一號掃海艇) was a Bangor-class minesweeper that was seized by the Imperial Japanese Navy before completion during World War II and converted into a convoy escort.

== History ==
She was laid down on 12 July 1941, at the Hong Kong shipyard of Taikoo Dockyard and Engineering Company as HMS Portland. In September 1941, while still under construction, she was renamed HMS Taitam. On 26 December 1941, still unfinished, she was seized by the Japanese after the Fall of Hong Kong. The Japanese continued construction and she was launched on 20 February 1943 and renamed W-101. On 10 April 1944, she was completed, commissioned, and attached to the Yokosuka Naval District under Lieutenant Commandeer Ginji Yamashita.

She spent most of 1944 on escort duty and conducting minesweeping activities between Japanese controlled ports in the Philippines (Manila, Zamboanga, Basilan Island), Borneo (Tarakan, Laut Island, Balikpapan), Flores Island (Maumere), Java (Surabaya), and Sulawesi (Macassar).

=== Convoy MI-27 ===
On 15 November 1944, she departed Moji, Kitakyūshū destined for Miri, Borneo with Type C escort ship CD-61, Type D escort ship CD-134, and No.1-class auxiliary submarine chasers Cha-156 and Cha-157 escorting convoy MI-27 consisting of four tankers (Awagawa Maru, Kyokuun Maru, Osakasan Maru, and Enkei Maru) and six transport/cargo ships (Edogawa Maru, Shoho Maru, Matsuura Maru, Seisho Maru, Koshu Maru, and Chinkai Maru). Enkei Maru and Kyokuun Maru developed mechanical problems and were forced to return to Moji. The convoy was running parallel to Convoy Hi-81 which had left Imari on 14 November 1944 destined for Formosa to benefit from air cover provided by HI-81's escort carrier Shin'yō which was carrying fourteen Nakajima B5N "Kate" torpedo bombers of the 931st Air Squadron, Saeki Naval Air Station. The two convoys converged together at times.

On 17 November 1944, in the Yellow Sea off Cheju Island, MI-27 was spotted by US submarines Sunfish and Peto which were operating in a wolfpack with Spadefish. Sunfish torpedoed and damaged both Edogawa Maru and Seisho Maru while Peto torpedoed and sank Osakasan Maru (killing 142). Nearby, Spadefish spotted Shin'yō of HI-81 and fired six torpedoes four of which hit causing the carrier to burst into flames and sink (killing 1,130). W-101 and CD-61 were disattached from MI-27 to pick up survivors. On 18 November 1944, Sunfish torpedoed and sank the damaged Seisho Maru (killing 448) and the damaged Edogawa Maru (killing 2,083); while Peto torpedoed and sank Chinkai Maru (killing 39). After losing four of the eight ships being escorted, the remainder of convoy MI-27 arrived at Sijiao Island on 19 November 1944.

=== Convoy Tama-33 ===
On 30 November 1944, W-101 departed Takao for Manila escorting landing craft depot ships Shinshū Maru and Kibitsu Maru along with escorts Tsushima, the Ukuru-class escort ship Daito, and four Type D escort ships (CD-14, CD-16, CD-46, and CD-134). The convoy diverted and disembarked its troops at San Fernando, Luzon due to enemy air attacks at Manila.

=== Convoy HI-85 ===
On 29 December 1944, she joined convoy HI-85 in the South China Sea consisting of the light cruiser Kashii, two Ukuru-class escort ships (Ukuru and Daito), and three Type C escort ships (CD-23, CD-27, CD-51) in escorting nine tankers (Enkei Maru, Yamazawa Maru, Engen Maru, Encho Maru, Daigyo Maru, Otususan Maru, Fuei Maru, Oei Maru, Seria Maru) and one cargo ship (Shinyu Maru). After several unsuccessful attacks by B-24 Liberator bombers, the convoy arrived at Cap Saint-Jacques on 4 January 1945.

=== Demise ===
On 11 January 1945, W-101 along with CD-35, CD-43, patrol boat No. 103, and subchaser CH-31 left Cap Saint Jacques escorting convoy SATA-05 consisting of two transports (Kensei Maru, Toyo Maru), a No.101-class landing ship (T-149), and three tankers (Ayayuki Maru, Koshin Maru, Eihi Maru) (T-149 was unable to handle the heavy seas and returned to Cap St Jacques). On 12 January 1945, off Cap Padaran (south of Phan Rang–Tháp Chàm) in the South China Sea (11°10′N 108°55′E), W-101 was attacked and sunk by aircraft from Vice Admiral John S. McCain, Sr.'s Task Force 38 that had entered the South China Sea to raid Japanese shipping. All the other ships of SATA-05 (excluding T-149) were attacked and sunk nearby. W-101 was struck from the Navy List on 10 March 1945.
