= Japanese submarine chaser Cha-156 =

History

Empire of Japan
- Name: Cha-156
- Laid down: 15 September 1943
- Launched: 25 January 1944
- Completed: 31 March 1944
- Stricken: 10 May 1945
- Home port: Kure
- Fate: Sunk by aircraft, 29 March 1945

General characteristics
- Class & type: No.1-class Submarine chaser
- Displacement: 130 long tons (132 t) standard
- Length: 29.20 m (95 ft 10 in) overall
- Beam: 5.65 m (18 ft 6 in)
- Draught: 1.97 m (6 ft 6 in)
- Propulsion: 1 × intermediate diesel; shingle shaft, 400 bhp (300 kW)
- Speed: 11.0 knots (20.4 km/h; 12.7 mph)
- Range: 1,000 nmi (1,900 km; 1,200 mi) at 10.0 kn (18.5 km/h; 11.5 mph)
- Complement: 32
- Armament: 1 × 7.7 mm machine gun; 22 × depth charges; 1 × dunking hydrophone; 1 × simple sonar; From mid 1943, the 7.7 mm machine gun was replaced with a 13.2mm machine gun

Cha-156 or No. 156 (Japanese: 第百五十六號驅潜特務艇) was a No.1-class auxiliary submarine chaser of the Imperial Japanese Navy that served during World War II.

== History ==
She was laid down on 15 September 1943 and launched on 25 January 1944. She was completed on 31 March 1944 and assigned to the Saeki Defense Unit, Kure Defense Force, Kure Naval District. On 1 November 1944, she was reassigned to the Kaohsiung Defense Force, Formosa.

=== Convoy MI-27 ===
On 15 November 1944, she departed Moji, Kitakyūshū destined for Miri, Borneo with fellow No.1-class auxiliary submarine chaser Cha-157, Type C escort ship CD-61, Type D escort ship CD-134, and minesweeper W-101, escorting convoy MI-27 consisting of four tankers (Awagawa Maru, Kyokuun Maru, Osakasan Maru, and Enkei Maru) and six transport/cargo ships (Edogawa Maru, Shoho Maru, Matsuura Maru, Seisho Maru, Koshu Maru, and Chinkai Maru). Enkei Maru and Kyokuun Maru developed mechanical problems and were forced to return to Moji. The convoy was running parallel to Convoy Hi-81 which had left Imari on 14 November 1944 destined for Formosa to benefit from air cover provided by HI-81's escort carrier Shin'yō which was carrying fourteen Nakajima B5N "Kate" torpedo bombers of the 931st Air Squadron, Saeki Naval Air Station. The two convoys converged together at times.

On 17 November 1944, in the Yellow Sea off Cheju Island, MI-27 was spotted by the US submarines Sunfish and Peto which were operating in a wolfpack with Spadefish. Sunfish torpedoed and damaged both Edogawa Maru and Seisho Maru while Peto torpedoed and sank Osakasan Maru (killing 142). Nearby, Spadefish spotted Shin'yō of HI-81 and fired six torpedoes four of which hit causing the carrier to burst into flames and sink (killing 1,130). W-101 and CD-61 were disattached from MI-27 to pick up survivors. On 18 November 1944, Sunfish torpedoed and sank the damaged Seisho Maru (killing 448) and the damaged Edogawa Maru (killing 2,083); while Peto torpedoed and sank Chinkai Maru (killing 39). After losing four of the eight ships being escorted, the remainder of convoy MI-27 arrived at Sijiao Island on 19 November 1944.

=== Demise ===
On 29 March 1945, she was attacked and sunk by Consolidated B-24 Liberators with the Fifth Air Force while docked in the port of Takao, Taiwan at 22°40′N 120°15′E. Cha-189, Cha-192, and merchant tanker Iwakuni Maru were also sunk. She was struck from the Navy List on 10 May 1945.
