= Gordon Waite Underwood =

American Navy captain

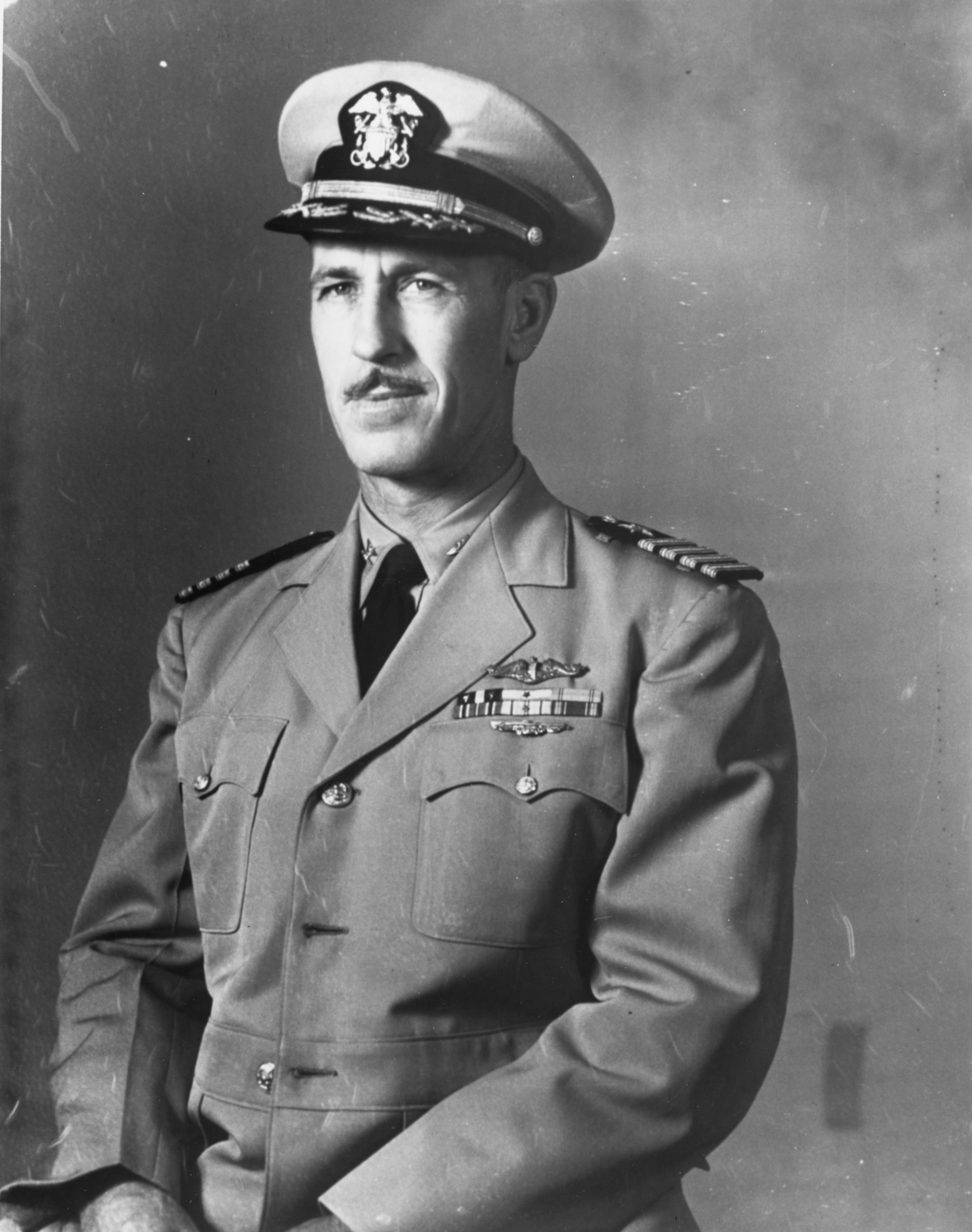
- Born: June 3, 1910; New York, U.S.
- Died: January 15, 1978 (aged 67)
- Military career
- Allegiance: United States
- Branch: United States Navy
- Service years: 1932–1962
- Rank: Captain
- Commands: USS Spadefish (SS-411)
- Conflicts: World War II: Battle of Convoy HI-81
- Awards: Navy Cross (3)

Gordon Waite Underwood was a United States Navy captain who was awarded the Navy Cross for his achievements during World War II. He is the namesake of the ship USS Underwood (FFG-36).

== Early life ==
Gordon Underwood was born in New York on June 3, 1910, and at an early age moved with his family to Portland, Oregon. In 1932, he was appointed to the United States Naval Academy. At the Naval Academy he proved to be an outstanding student and superb athlete. He earned letters and starred in football and track. He was awarded the coveted Naval Academy Sword for athletic excellence.

== Naval career ==
Following his graduation from the Naval Academy, Underwood served in USS Oklahoma (BB-37). This tour was followed by training at the United States Submarine School in New London, Connecticut. After his graduation he served in the Submarine School, USS S-21 (SS-126), USS Mississippi (BB-41), and USS Vega (AK-17). In 1941, he attended Massachusetts Institute of Technology and earned a master's degree in Marine Engineering.

Returning to sea duty, Underwood was assigned to the Staff of Commander Submarine Squadron Ten as Squadron Engineer supporting submarines on war patrol. In January 1944, he was assigned as commanding officer of USS Spadefish (SS-411). On this ship during three war patrols he was credited with destruction of 76,000 tons of enemy shipping, including the aircraft carrier Shinyo. For each of his war patrols he was awarded a Navy Cross and in recognition of the great successes of the first two patrols Spadefish was awarded the Presidential Unit Citation.

Underwood's record of success in his war patrols remains one of the most notable in the history of the United States Navy Submarine Service.

== Corporate career ==
Captain Underwood retired from the navy in 1962 after 30 years of distinguished service. After retirement, he became Vice President of Spelin Inc., Mountain View, California. He was also Vice President of Filter-Aire of Hollister, California until his retirement.

== Awards & Decorations ==

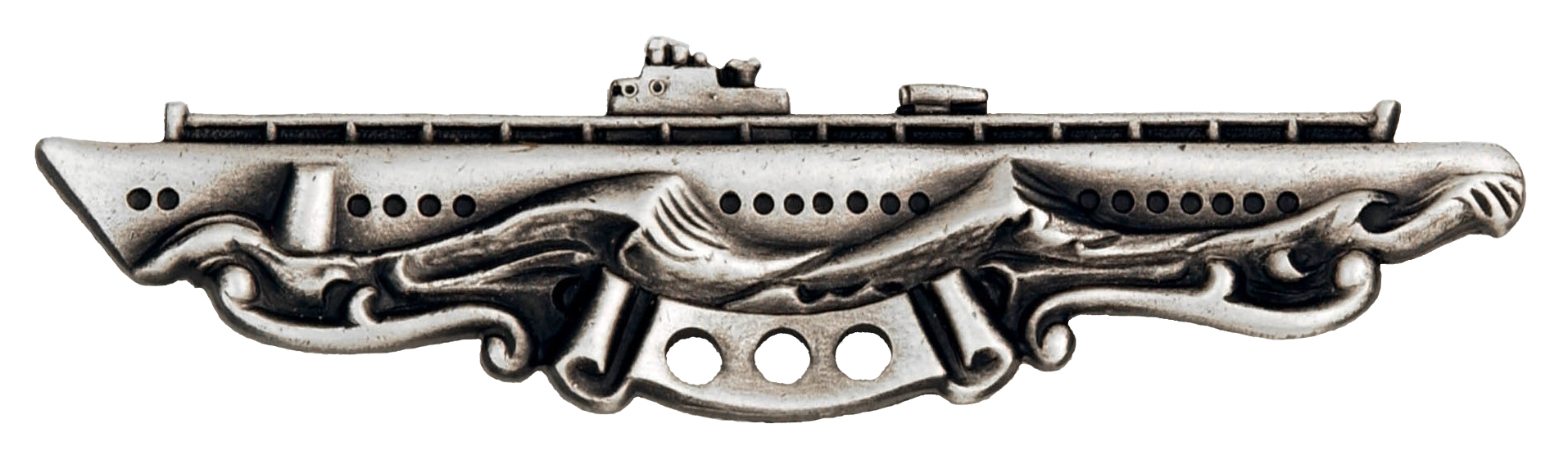

Submarine Warfare Insignia
Navy Cross with two gold award stars
Navy Presidential Unit Citation with bronze service star	American Defense Service Medal	American Campaign Medal
Asiatic-Pacific Campaign Medal with one silver service star	World War II Victory Medal	National Defense Service Medal with one bronze service star
Submarine Combat Patrol Insignia

=== Navy Cross citation (first award) ===

Commander in Chief Pacific: Serial 07434 (December 10, 1944)
The President of the United States of America takes pleasure in presenting the Navy Cross to Commander Gordon Waite Underwood (NSN: 0-71439), United States Navy, for extraordinary heroism in the line of his profession as Commanding Officer of the U.S.S. SPADEFISH (SS-411), on the FIRST War Patrol of that submarine during the period 23 July 1944 to 24 September 1944, in enemy controlled waters of the Luzon Strait in the Philippine Islands. Through tenacious and highly aggressive actions Commander Underwood skillfully penetrated heavy and unusually alert escort screens, which included air support, to press home cleverly planned and well executed torpedo attacks which resulted in the sinking of six enemy ships totaling 40,000 tons and damaging two additional enemy ships totaling 14,500 tons. Subsequent heavy anti-submarine efforts by the enemy and their depth charging were skillfully evaded by his intelligent evasive tactics thus enabling him to escape and avoid severe damage to his ship. Through his experience and sound judgment Commander Underwood brought his ship safely back to port. His conduct throughout was an inspiration to his officers and men and in keeping with the highest traditions of the United States Naval Service.

=== Navy Cross citation (second award) ===

Commander in Chief Pacific: Serial 01690 (February 25, 1945)
The President of the United States of America takes pleasure in presenting a Gold Star in lieu of a Second Award of the Navy Cross to Commander Gordon Waite Underwood (NSN: 0-71439), United States Navy, for extraordinary heroism in the line of his profession as Commanding Officer of the U.S.S. SPADEFISH (SS-411), on the SECOND War Patrol of that submarine during the period 23 October 1944 to 12 December 1944, in enemy controlled waters of the East China Sea. By his superb skill, courage, and aggressiveness, Commander Underwood successfully launched well-planned and smartly executed attacks which resulted in sinking enemy ships totaling over 30,000 tons and damaging an additional large vessel. Through his experience and sound judgment Commander Underwood brought his ship safely back to port. His conduct throughout was an inspiration to his officers and men and in keeping with the highest traditions of the United States Naval Service.

=== Navy Cross citation (third award) ===

Commander in Chief Pacific: Serial 03555 (April 25, 1945)
The President of the United States of America takes pleasure in presenting a Second Gold Star in lieu of a Third Award of the Navy Cross to Commander Gordon Waite Underwood (NSN: 0-71439), United States Navy, for extraordinary heroism in the line of his profession as Commanding Officer of the U.S.S. SPADEFISH (SS-411), on the THIRD War Patrol of that submarine during the period 6 January 1945 to 13 February 1945, in enemy controlled waters of the East China Sea. Making six courageous attacks in the face of unusually numerous escorts, Commander Underwood coolly penetrated the defenses of four escort vessels each time and successfully concluded five attacks which resulted in sinking four enemy ships for a total of 16,400 tons and in damaging one ship for 7,500 tons. By his vast experience gained in previous depth charge attacks, he cleverly evaded extremely heavy countermeasures and brought his ship back to port. His skill, courage and unwavering devotion to duty were in keeping with the highest traditions of the United States Naval Service.
