= Japanese landing craft carrier Mayasan Maru =

Japanese landing craft depot ship (1942–1944)

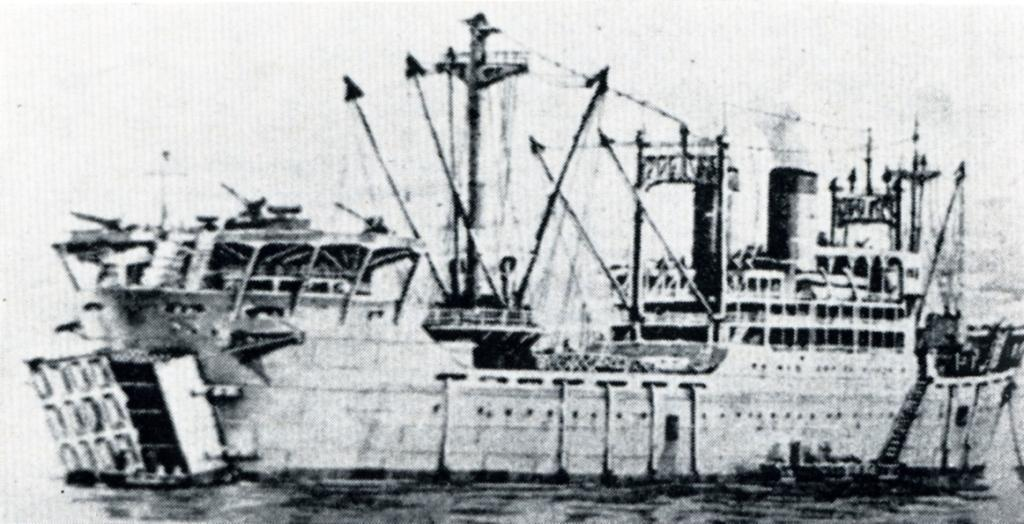
- Rear view of Mayasan Maru

History

Japan
- Name: Mayasan Maru
- Builder: Mitsui Shipbuilding, Tamano, Japan
- Laid down: 27 August 1941
- Launched: 29 June 1942
- Completed: 14 December 1942
- Commissioned: December 1942
- Fate: Sunk, 17 November 1944

General characteristics
- Class & type: Type A Special Purpose Ship
- Type: Landing craft depot ship
- Displacement: 11,910 long tons (12,101 t) standard
- Length: 459 ft 1 in (139.93 m)
- Beam: 62 ft 4 in (19.00 m)
- Depth: 23 ft 1 in (7.04 m)
- Propulsion: 10,800 hp (8,054 kW) diesel engines
- Speed: 20.8 knots (38.5 km/h; 23.9 mph)
- Boats & landing craft carried: 20 × Daihatsu class landing craft
- Armament: 6 × 75 mm (3.0 in) AA guns; 20 × 13.2 mm (0.52 in) machine guns

Mayasan Maru (摩耶山丸) was a Japanese "Type A" landing craft depot ship used extensively to transport Imperial Japanese Army (IJA) troops during 1943 and 1944. After avoiding damage in seven separate submarine attacks in earlier convoys, she was sunk in the East China Sea by the submarine USS Picuda on 17 November 1944 while part of Convoy Hi-81. The sinking caused one of the highest maritime casualty counts of World War II. Some 3,536 people died.

== Service history ==
The ship was laid down at the Mitsui shipyard in Tamano on 27 August 1941 as a Type M cargo ship for the Mitsui Line. While still under construction the ship was requisitioned by the Imperial Navy and converted to a landing craft depot ship. She was not fitted with any aircraft facility, having a hangar, cranes, and a bridge to deploy and operate landing craft. Launched on 29 June 1942, the ship was completed and commissioned in December 1942.

=== 1943 ===
Her maiden voyage was from Hiroshima to Rabaul and return with convoy B-2 in January 1943. Mayasan Maru made a second voyage with convoy B-2 carrying IJA troops from Pusan to Rabaul in February. She then traveled to Palau in March, Rabaul in April, and Truk in May. She avoided damage while returning to Japan in convoy No. 4508 attacked by USS Plunger from May 9 through 11th, 1943; and completed a round trip from Japan to Singapore in June. She joined convoy 0-603 from Japan to Palau in late August and convoy N-404 from Palau to Rabaul in September. While returning to Palau, she avoided damage when convoy O-602A was attacked by USS Scamp on 18 September 1943. She completed two trips from Palau to Japan in October with convoys FU-202 and FU-302 before joining convoy SA-17 for a trip to Singapore in November. She traveled from Singapore to Pusan in December; and avoided damage when return convoy Hi-27 was attacked by USS Flying Fish in the South China Sea on 26 December 1943.

=== 1944 ===
Mayasan Maru returned to Japan with convoy Q to load the 3rd Battalion of the 119th Infantry Regiment with the 53rd Engineer Regiment, 53rd Signal Regiment, and headquarters of the IJA 53rd Division for transport to Manila with convoy Hi-37. She returned to Japan in February 1944 to load the 1st and 2nd Battalions of the IJA 151st Infantry Regiment with the 53rd Artillery Regiment and the 53rd Reconnaissance Regiment for transport to Singapore in April with convoy HI-57. While returning to Japan she avoided damage when convoy Hi-58 was attacked by USS Robalo on 24 April 1944. She traveled from Japan to Manila in May and returned to Japan in June to load the 378th, 379th and 380th Independent Infantry Battalions with other elements of the IJA 58th Independent Mixed Brigade. She avoided damage in the 12 July 1944 attack by USS Apogon and Piranha while transporting these troops to the Philippines with convoy MOMA-01. She similarly avoided damage when return convoy Hi-68 was attacked by USS Crevalle, Flasher and Angler on July 25 and 26.

Mayasan Maru was attached to convoy Hi-71 carrying Operation Shō reinforcements to the Philippines. The convoy sailed into the South China Sea from Mako naval base in the Pescadores on 17 August, and was discovered that evening by USS Redfish. Redfish assembled USS Rasher, Bluefish and Spadefish for a radar-assisted wolfpack attack in typhoon conditions on the night of 18/19 August. Although nearly half of the ships in convoy Hi-71 were torpedoed, Mayasan Maru again avoided damage and returned to Japan with convoy MAMO-02. She then made six trips transporting troops from Pusan to Japan in September and October.

=== Sinking ===
Mayasan Maru, as part of Convoy Hi-81, set sail from Imari Bay on 14 November 1944. On board were 4,387 soldiers of the 23rd Division, including the divisional headquarters, artillery and engineer companies. Also aboard was the 24th Sea Raiding Battalion with Maru-Ni explosive motorboats, 740 replacements for the Southern Army, 88 Army communications school graduates, various specialists in artillery, communications, engineering, ordnance and transport, and 204 horses.

At 18:15 on 17 November 1944 at position 33°17′N 124°41′E, Mayasan Maru was torpedoed by USS Picuda in rising seas, and sank in two and a half minutes taking with her 3,536 men. The escorts rescued about 1,300 men.

== See also ==
- List by death toll of ships sunk by submarines
