= Edogawa Maru =

Japanese cargo ship, sunk 1944

History

Japan
- Launched: 1944
- Completed: 20 May 1944
- Fate: Torpedoed and sunk, 18 November 1944

General characteristics
- Type: Troop transport
- Tonnage: 6,968 tons
- Length: 128 m (419 ft 11 in)
- Beam: 18.2 m (59 ft 9 in)
- Draft: 11.1 m (36 ft 5 in)
- Propulsion: Steam turbine

Edogawa Maru (Kanji:江戸川丸) was a 6,968-ton Japanese Type 2A Wartime Standard cargo ship that was sunk by USS Sunfish on 18 November 1944 with 2,114 lives lost.

Edogawa Maru sailed as part of convoy MI-27 with seven other ships from Moji to Miri, Borneo, on 15 November 1944. Escorted by a converted minesweeper (W-101) and three smaller escorts (Type D escort ship CD-134 and two No.1-class auxiliary submarine chasers, Cha-156 and CHa-157), the convoy hugged the coast of the Korean Peninsula to try to avoid American submarines. Nevertheless, a group of three submarines—Peto, Spadefish, and Sunfish—found and attacked the convoy on the night of 17/18 November. At 22:00 a torpedo from Sunfish struck and crippled Edogawa Maru. In the early hours of 18 November a second torpedo from Sunfish finished off Edogawa Maru. The ship had not been evacuated in the meantime and 1,998 soldiers and 116 crewmen died when the ship sunk.

The ships Seisho Maru, Osakasan Maru, and Chinaki Maru were also sunk that night.

== See also ==
- List by death toll of ships sunk by submarines
