= Seisho Maru =

Cargo ship for Mitsui Bussan Kaisho (1918)

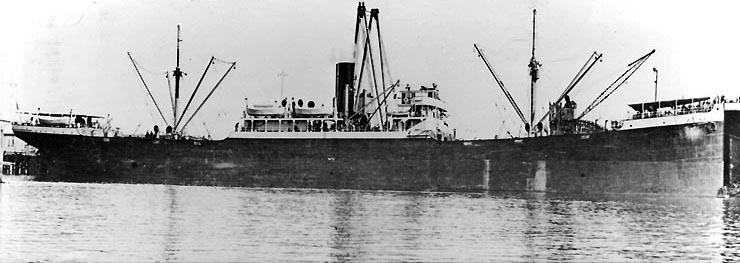
- Seisho Maru had design and measurements similar to West Carnifax, a sister ship from the same shipyard seen here.

History
- Name: 1919–1923: West Caruth; 1923–1934: Exmoor; 1924–1928: Antonio Tripcovich; 1928–1944: Seisho Maru
- Owner: 1919–1923: U.S. Shipping Board; 1923–1924: North Devon Steamship Co.; 1924–1928: Tripcovich Shipping Company; 1928–c. 1930s: Oguma Shoten Gomei Kaisha; c. 1930s–1944: Mitsui Bussan Kaisho
- Port of registry: 1919–1923: United States; 1923–1924: United Kingdom; 1924–1928: (Kingdom of Italy) Italy; 1928–1944: (Empire of Japan) Japan
- Builder: Southwestern Shipbuilding; San Pedro, California
- Yard number: 2
- Launched: 31 December 1918
- Sponsored by: Miss Betty Howard
- Completed: February 1919
- Identification: Japanese Official number: 33570
- Fate: Sunk November 1944

General characteristics
- Type: Cargo ship
- Tonnage: 5,632 GRT; 8,600 LT DWT
- Length: 410 ft 5 in (125.10 m) (LPP)
- Beam: 54 ft 6 in (16.61 m)
- Propulsion: 1 × triple-expansion steam engine
- Speed: 10.5 knots (19.4 km/h)

Seisho Maru (Japanese: 盛祥丸, Seishō Maru ) was a cargo ship for Mitsui Bussan Kaisho in military service that was sunk by an American submarine during World War II. The ship had been built as SS West Caruth, a cargo ship for the United States Shipping Board (USSB) shortly after the end of World War I. Shortly after completion, the ship was inspected by the United States Navy for possible use as USS West Caruth (ID-2850) but was neither taken into the Navy nor ever commissioned under that name. Before being sold to Japanese owners in 1928, she was also known as SS Exmoor and SS Antonio Tripcovich.

West Caruth was built in 1918 for the USSB, as a part of the West boats, a series of steel-hulled cargo ships built on the West Coast of the United States for the World War I war effort, and was the second ship built at Southwestern Shipbuilding in San Pedro, California. After operating for four years under American registry, she was sold several times and operated under British, Italian, and Japanese registry throughout the remainder of her career. In November 1944, while serving as Japanese transport Seisho Maru during World War II, she was sunk by U.S. Navy submarine Sunfish.

== Design and construction ==
The West ships were cargo ships of similar size and design built by several shipyards on the West Coast of the United States for the USSB for emergency use during World War I. All were given names that began with the word West, like West Caruth, the second of some 18 West ships built by the Southwestern Shipbuilding of San Pedro, California. West Caruth (Southwestern Shipbuilding No. 2) was launched at 08:00 on 31 December 1918 by sponsor Betty Howard, the nine-year-old daughter of company vice president, William F. Howard, and completed in February 1919.

West Caruth was 5,632 gross register tons (GRT), and was 410 feet 5 inches (125.10 m) long (between perpendiculars) and 54 feet 6 inches (16.61 m) abeam. The ship had a single triple-expansion steam engine that drove a single screw propeller, and moved the ship at up to 10.5 knots (19.4 km/h).

== Career ==
West Caruth was inspected by the 12th Naval District of the United States Navy after completion for possible use as a service collier and was assigned the identification number of 3850. Had she been commissioned, she would have been known as USS West Caruth (ID-3850), but the Navy neither took over the ship nor commissioned her.

The cargo ship sailed for the USSB under American registry for the first four years of her existence, and sailed to the west African ports of Dakar and Monrovia through 1921. The Los Angeles Times reported that West Caruth sailed out of Los Angeles in both transpacific and European–Pacific service for two years.

In 1923, West Caruth was sold to the North Devon Steamship Company and operated as tramp steamer Exmoor under the British flag. In 1924, she was purchased by the Tripcovich Shipping Company of Trieste and sailed under the Italian flag as Antonio Tripcovich. Four years later, she was renamed Seisho Maru as a part of Oguma Shoten Gomei Kaisha of Tsurumi under Japanese registry. By the early 1930s Seisho Maru had been sold to Mitsui Bussan Kaisho.

There is scant record of the ship's movements under any of her later names. The Los Angeles Times reported her arrival at West Coast ports as Seisho Maru at least twice. In March 1930, the ship arrived at Tacoma, Washington, from Singapore to pick up a load of logs for export. Another notice in November 1933 noted her impending return to Los Angeles, where she was scheduled to take on a load of borax and scrap brass. In early May 1939, Seisho Maru ran aground in Tokyo Bay, but was refloated after several days.

During World War II, Seisho Maru served as an army transport, but sources reporting her movements are incomplete. It is known that she was one of some 20 ships that departed Takau as part of three combined convoys—TASA-17, TE-03, and No. 82—in mid-April 1944.

Seisho Maru and seven other ships formed convoy MI-27 which departed Moji for Miri, Borneo, on 15 November that same year. Escorted by a converted minesweeper (W-101) and three smaller escorts (Type D escort ship CD-134 and two No.1-class auxiliary submarine chasers, CHa-156 and CHa-157), the convoy hugged the coast of the Korean Peninsula to try to avoid American submarines. Nevertheless, a group of three submarines—Peto, Spadefish, and Sunfish—found and attacked the convoy on the night of 17/18 November. Torpedoes from Sunfish sank Edogawa Maru and damaged Seisho Maru shortly after 22:00, while Peto sank Osakasan Maru at 23:40. At 01:30, the damaged Seisho Maru engaged in a gun battle with a surfaced submarine. Then, at 03:17, another spread of torpedoes from Sunfish finished off Seisho Maru, which sank at position 33°36′N 124°18′E in the East China Sea. (Note: USS Peto also sank Chinaki Maru later that morning for a total loss of half the convoy ships.) 412 soldiers and 36 crewmen were killed.

== Bibliography ==
- Cressman, Robert (2000). "Chapter V: 1943". The Official Chronology of the U.S. Navy in World War II. Annapolis, Maryland: Naval Institute Press. ISBN 978-1-55750-149-3. OCLC 41977179.
- Crowell, Benedict; Robert Forrest Wilson (1921). The Road to France: The Transportation of Troops and Military Supplies, 1917–1918. How America Went to War: An Account From Official Sources of the Nation's War Activities, 1917–1920. New Haven: Yale University Press. OCLC 18696066.
- Naval Historical Center. "West Caruth". Dictionary of American Naval Fighting Ships. Navy Department, Naval History and Heritage Command.
