= USS Underwood =

1982 Oliver Hazard Perry-class frigate

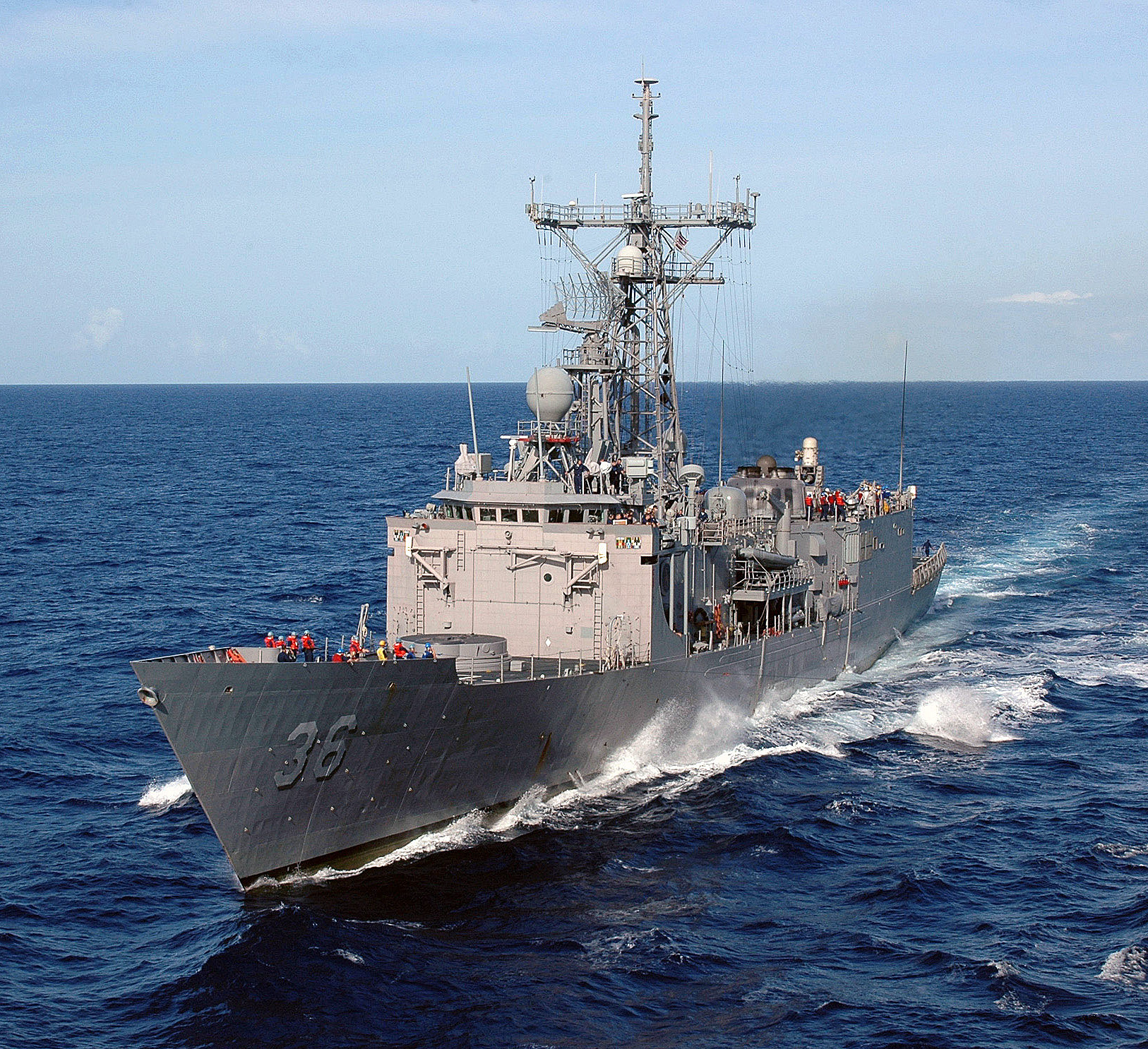
- USS Underwood underway in the Caribbean Sea in 2006

History

United States
- Name: Underwood
- Namesake: Captain Gordon Waite Underwood
- Ordered: 27 April 1979
- Builder: Bath Iron Works, Bath, Maine
- Laid down: 30 July 1981
- Launched: 6 February 1982
- Sponsored by: Elizabeth T. Underwood
- Christened: 6 February 1982
- Acquired: 14 January 1983
- Commissioned: 29 January 1983
- Decommissioned: 8 March 2013
- Home port: Mayport, Florida
- Identification: Hull symbol:FFG-36; Code letters:NGWU
- Motto: "Fear the Wood"/"Just Friend and Brave Enemy"
- Status: Undergoing scrapping
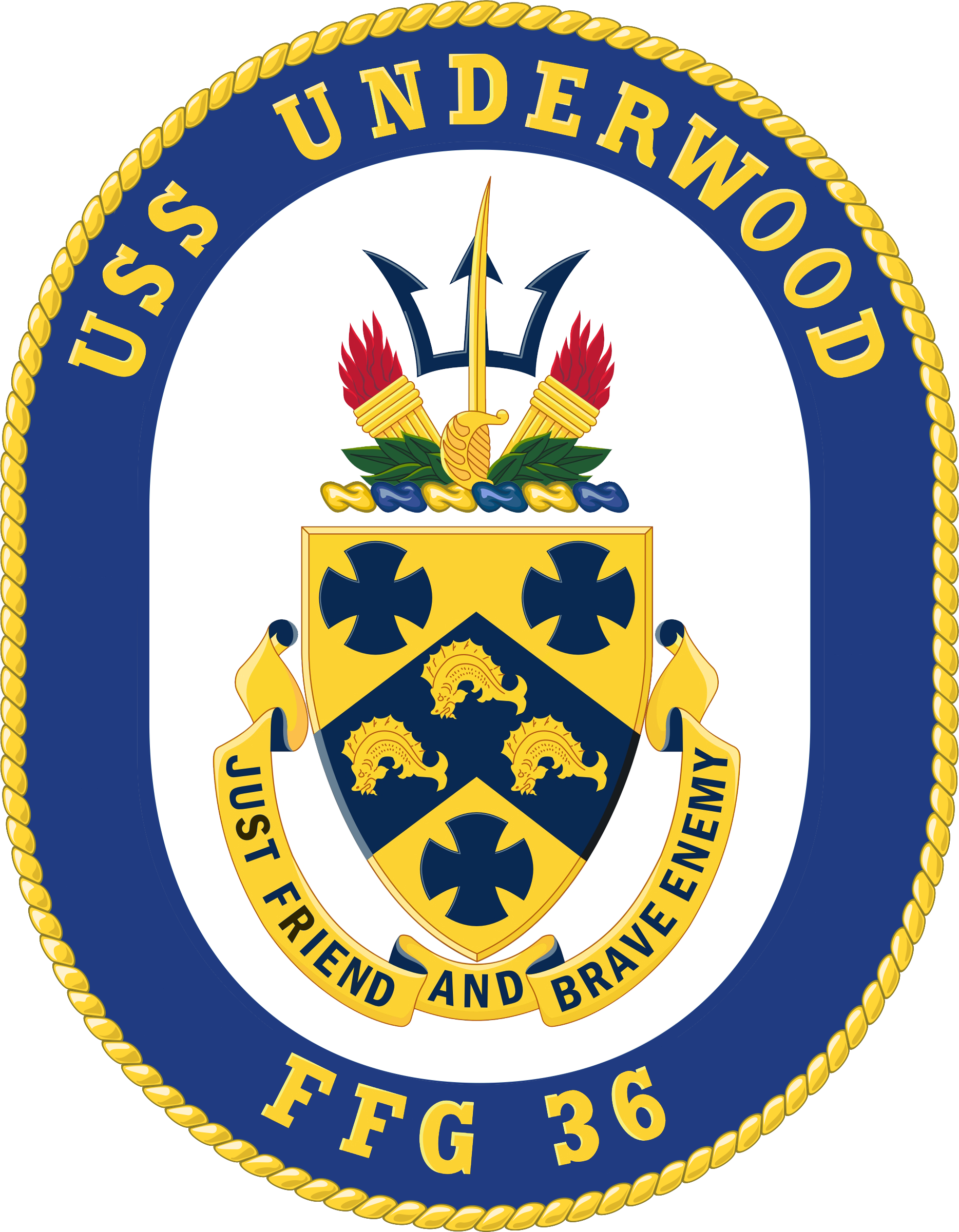
- Badge

General characteristics
- Class & type: Oliver Hazard Perry-class frigate
- Displacement: 4,100 long tons (4,200 t), full load
- Length: 453 feet (138 m), overall
- Beam: 45 feet (14 m)
- Draught: 22 feet (6.7 m)
- Propulsion: 2 × General Electric LM2500-30 gas turbines generating 41,000 shp (31 MW) through a single shaft and variable pitch propeller; 2 × Auxiliary Propulsion Units, 350 hp (260 kW) retractable electric azimuth thrusters for maneuvering and docking.
- Speed: over 29 knots (54 km/h)
- Range: 5,000 nautical miles at 18 knots (9,300 km at 33 km/h)
- Complement: 17 Officers and 198 Enlisted, plus SH-60 LAMPS detachment of roughly six officer pilots and 15 enlisted maintainers
- Sensors & processing systems: AN/SPS-49 air-search radar; AN/SPS-55 surface-search radar; CAS and STIR fire-control radar; AN/SQS-56 sonar.
- Electronic warfare & decoys: AN/SLQ-32
- Armament: As built: 1 × OTO Melara Mk 75 76 mm/62 caliber naval gun; 2 × Mk 32 triple-tube (324 mm) launchers for Mark 46 torpedoes; 1 × Vulcan Phalanx CIWS; 4 × .50-cal (12.7 mm) machine guns.; 1 × Mk 13 Mod 4 single-arm launcher for Harpoon anti-ship missiles and SM-1MR Standard anti-ship/air missiles (40 round magazine); Note: As of 2004, Mk 13 systems removed from all active US vessels of this class.
- Aircraft carried: 2 × SH-60 LAMPS III helicopters

USS Underwood (FFG-36) was the twenty-seventh ship of the Oliver Hazard Perry-class of guided-missile frigates, named for Captain Gordon Waite Underwood (1910–1978).

Ordered from Bath Iron Works, Bath, Maine, on 27 April 1979 as part of the FY79 program, Underwood was laid down on 30 July 1981, launched on 6 February 1982, and commissioned on 29 January 1983. She was assigned to Destroyer Squadron 14 and homeported at Mayport, FL.

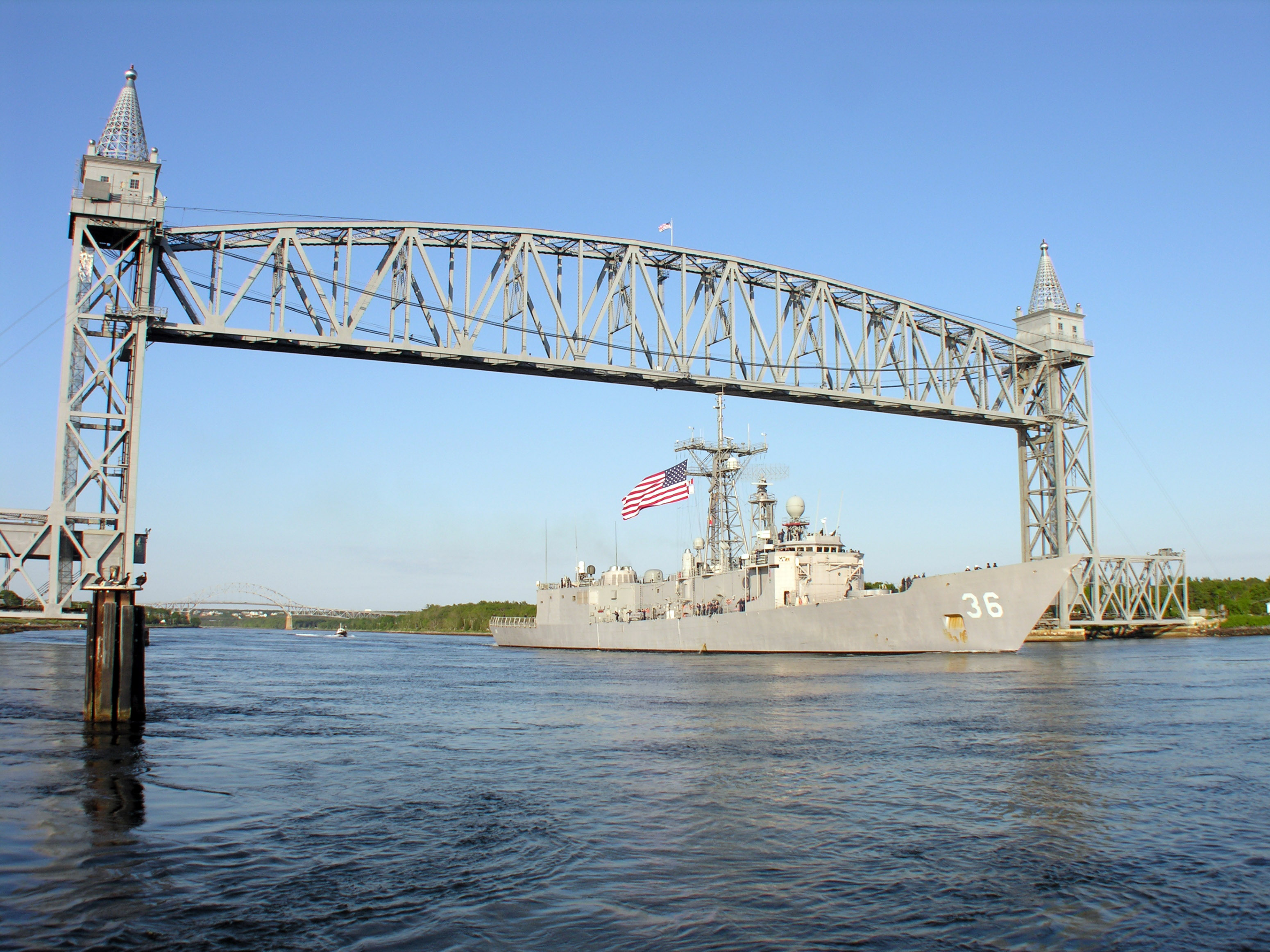
Underwood passing under the Cape Cod Canal Railroad Bridge, June 2006

On 13 January 2010, Underwood was ordered to assist in the humanitarian relief efforts following the 2010 Haiti earthquake.

Underwood was extensively used to counteract drug trafficking in Latin America with the assistance of the Coast Guard.

Underwood was decommissioned at Naval Station Mayport on 8 March 2013. It was then moved to the Naval Inactive Ship Maintenance Facility in Philadelphia, Pennsylvania, where it was laid up.

On 27 February 2023, Underwood arrived at Brownsville, Texas, where it will be scrapped.
