= VMSB-245 =

Marine Scout Bombing Squadron 245
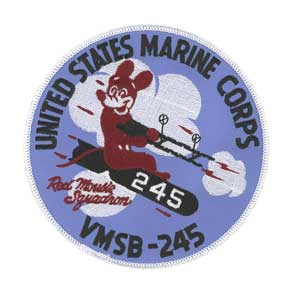
- VMSB-245 Insignia
- Active: 15 September 1943 – 17 November 1945
- Country: United States of America
- Branch: United States Marine Corps
- Type: Dive Bomber squadron
- Role: Reconnaissance; Air Interdiction; Close air support
- Part of: N/A
- Nickname(s): Red Mousie Squadron
- Engagements: World War II

Aircraft flown
- Bomber: SBD Dauntless

Marine Scout Bombing Squadron 245 (VMSB-245) was a dive bomber squadron in the United States Marine Corps during World War II. The squadron, also known as the "Red Mousie Squadron", operated from Midway and Makin Atolls, Majuro and Ulithi while overseas. The squadron was decommissioned on 17 November 1945, shortly after the end of the war.

== History ==
VMSB-245 was commissioned at Marine Corps Air Station El Toro on 1 July 1943. After training for a few months, the squadron deployed to Marine Corps Air Station Ewa, Hawaii arriving there on 31 December 1943. On 5 January 1944, it moved to Midway Atoll to conduct anti-submarine patrol duty. The squadron returned to MCAS Ewa on 1 April 1944.

On 5 May 1944, the squadron left Hawaii on board the USS Copahee headed for Majuro where they arrived on 15 May. Later in the same month, they moved to Makin Atoll from which they conducted combat operations against bypassed Japanese garrisons in the Marshall Islands from 1 June until 29 October 1944. Late October saw the squadron move back to Majuro where they continued carrying out strikes.

On 6 January 1945, two VMSB-245 SBD Dauntless dive bombers mistook the United States Navy submarine USS Spadefish (SS-411) for a Japanese submarine and dropped two depth charges on her after she submerged off Majuro. Spadefish suffered only superficial damage and no casualties. March 1945 saw the squadron move again, this time to Ulithi, where it remained until the end of the war in August 1945.

VMSB-245 was decommissioned on 17 November 1945.

== See also ==
- United States Marine Corps Aviation
- List of active United States Marine Corps aircraft squadrons
- List of decommissioned United States Marine Corps aircraft squadrons
