= William T. Nelson =

William T. Nelson (October 15, 1908 – September 11, 1994) was a rear admiral in the United States Navy.

== Biography ==
Nelson was born in Fall River, Massachusetts on October 15, 1908. He authored a book entitled Fresh Water Submarines: The Manitowoc Story about the submarines built by the Manitowoc Shipbuilding Company in Manitowoc, Wisconsin. He died in Falls Church, Virginia on September 11, 1994.

== Career ==
Nelson graduated from the United States Naval Academy in 1930. During World War II he commanded the USS R-7, USS Peto (SS-265), and USS Lamprey (SS-372). He retired in 1965.
