= USS Picuda =

Submarine of the United States

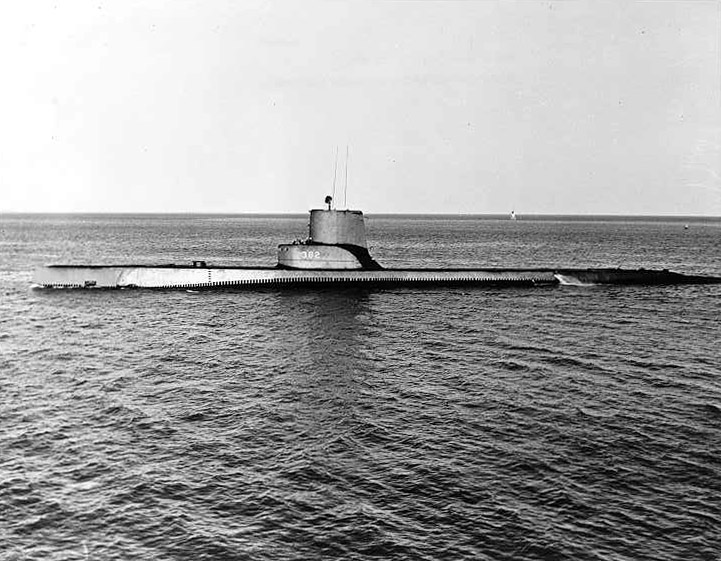
- Port side view of the Picuda (SS-382), after refit and conversion at Portsmouth Naval Shipyard NH, somewhere in the Atlantic, 1954.

History

United States
- Name: USS Picuda (SS-382)
- Builder: Portsmouth Naval Shipyard, Kittery, Maine
- Laid down: 15 March 1943
- Launched: 12 July 1943
- Commissioned: 16 October 1943
- Decommissioned: 25 September 1946
- Recommissioned: 19 June 1953
- Decommissioned: 1 October 1972
- Stricken: 1 November 1974
- Fate: Transferred to Spain, 1 October 1972

Spain
- Name: Narciso Monturiol (S-33)
- Acquired: 1 October 1972
- Stricken: 30 April 1977

General characteristics (World War II)
- Class & type: Balao-class diesel-electric submarine
- Displacement: 1,526 tons (1,550 t) surfaced; 2,391 tons (2,429 t) submerged
- Length: 311 ft 6 in (94.95 m)
- Beam: 27 ft 3 in (8.31 m)
- Draft: 16 ft 10 in (5.13 m) maximum
- Propulsion: 4 × Fairbanks-Morse Model 38D8-⅛ 10-cylinder opposed piston diesel engines driving electrical generators; 2 × 126-cell Sargo batteries; 4 × high-speed Elliott electric motors with reduction gears; two propellers; 5,400 shp (4.0 MW) surfaced; 2,740 shp (2.0 MW) submerged
- Speed: 20.25 knots (37 km/h) surfaced; 8.75 knots (16 km/h) submerged
- Range: 11,000 nm (20,000 km) surfaced at 10 knots (19 km/h)
- Endurance: 48 hours at 2 knots (4 km/h) submerged; 75 days on patrol
- Test depth: 400 ft (120 m)
- Complement: 10 officers, 70–71 enlisted
- Armament: 10 × 21-inch (533 mm) torpedo tubes; 6 forward, 4 aft; 24 torpedoes; 1 × 5-inch (127 mm) / 25 caliber deck gun; Bofors 40 mm and Oerlikon 20 mm cannon

General characteristics (Guppy IIA)
- Class & type: none
- Displacement: 1,848 tons (1,878 t) surfaced; 2,440 tons (2,479 t) submerged
- Length: 307 ft (94 m)
- Beam: 27 ft 4 in (8.33 m)
- Draft: 17 ft (5.2 m)
- Propulsion: Snorkel added; One diesel engine and generator removed; Batteries upgraded to Sargo II
- Speed: Surfaced: 17.0 knots (31.5 km/h) maximum; 13.5 knots (25.0 km/h) cruising; Submerged: 14.1 knots (26.1 km/h) for ½ hour; 8.0 knots (14.8 km/h) snorkeling; 3.0 knots (5.6 km/h) cruising
- Armament: 10 × 21 inch (533 mm) torpedo tubes; (six forward, four aft); all guns removed

USS Picuda (SS-382), a Balao-class submarine, was originally named Obispo, making her the only ship of the United States Navy to be named for the obispo, a spotted sting ray.

== Construction and launching ==
Obispo′s keel was laid down by the Portsmouth Navy Yard in Kittery, Maine, on 15 March 1943. She was launched on 12 July 1943 sponsored by Mrs. Robert H. English. On 24 September 1943, she was renamed Picuda, making her the only ship of the United States Navy to be named for the picuda, a great barracuda, up to 7 feet (2.1 m) long, of the Caribbean Sea and the tropical western Atlantic Ocean, known for its ferocious voracity. She was commissioned on 16 October 1943.

Picuda remained in the Portsmouth Navy Yard to complete fitting out until 18 November 1943, when she commenced underway trials. She completed torpedo tube trials off Newport, Rhode Island from 14 December through 16 December 1943, and she shifted to the submarine base at New London, Connecticut, for final training exercises. She put to sea from New London on 1 January 1944, reported for duty with the United States Pacific Fleet at Balboa, Panama Canal Zone, on 13 January 1944, arrived at Pearl Harbor, Hawaii, on 27 January 1944, and joined the Pacific Fleet Submarine Force as a unit of Submarine Division 201, Submarine Squadron 20.

== Pacific War ==
Picuda got underway from Pearl Harbor for her first war patrol on 17 February, setting course for waters off the Caroline Islands, and entering her designated patrol area on 29 February. In an area not far from Truk, she sank 2,672-ton ex-gunboat Shinyo Maru on 2 March, going deep to evade a string of 15 depth charges dropped by searching corvettes. On 18 March, Picuda changed course to patrol along the Saipan-Palau shipping lanes. She scored hits on a large enemy tanker that afternoon but was held down by two destroyers while the target escaped. She was off Yap Island a few minutes after midnight of 19 March, and sank 1,504-ton cargo ship Hoko Maru with two torpedoes.

Eleven days later she closed two cargo ship under escort of two destroyers off the west coast of Yap Island and let go five torpedoes at the largest merchantman. The first hit stopped the target dead in the water and a second torpedo tore off the port quarter capsized the 5,873-ton cargo ship Atlantic Maru. Two destroyers came down the torpedo tracks to hover over Picuda and she was shaken by 26 exploding depth charges before she escaped. With only one torpedo worth firing she returned to Midway Island on 5 April. Upon completion of her refit, she took aboard student officers and men for indoctrination training exercises off Midway, from 28 to 30 April. Three days later she formed a wolf-pack with submarines Perch and Peto.

Picuda put to sea from Midway with the wolf-pack 4 May to conduct her second war patrol in waters off Formosa. On 22 May, she sent four bow shots streaking to sink 1,200-ton river gunboat Hashidate. She also severely damaged 3,172-ton cargo ship Tsukauba Maru with the same salvo. The latter enemy was polished off by land-based aircraft from the United States Army Air Corps the following day. On 2 June, Picuda closed a convoy of twelve ships hugging the coast of Formosa. After sending her contact report to the other submarines of her wolf-pack, she slipped between two of the three leading escorts and pressed home an attack on a large tanker. Three hits were heard as all escorts made for Picuda. She maneuvered clear and sustained no damage from the many depth charges which exploded on all sides and above from eight enemy vessels during the next hour. She continued to patrol the Formosa coast until 4 June then passed off Batan Island and eastward of the Nansei Shoto to a point northward of Chichi Jima by 14 June. Two days later she pointed her bow for Midway where she arrived 22 June. She put to sea the next day to arrive at Pearl Harbor 27 June. After the end of the second war patrol, Raborn was replaced as skipper of Picuda by Commander Glynn R. Donaho.

Picuda, in wolf-pack with sister ships Spadefish and Redfish, departed Pearl Harbor for her third war patrol 23 July in waters of the Luzon Strait between Formosa and Luzon. On 25 August, Picuda spotted ten ships hugging the coast some 4,000 yards (3,700 m) off the beach of Luzon. Slipping past five escorts, and with three enemy patrol planes overhead, she fired six torpedoes to sink 1,943-ton tanker Kotoku Maru, and then sank the 1,270 ton pursuing Japanese destroyer Yūnagi. Picuda probed deeper in the interior of Luzon Strait on 16 September, for a bold daylight attack on an eight-ship convoy, guarded by three destroyers and air cover. She sank 5,975-ton cargo ship Tokushima Maru and scored hits for unknown damage to two other cargo ships. Searching the southern border of her assigned patrol area, Picuda found another convoy hugging the north coast of Luzon on 21 September and sank the 1,948-ton cargo ship Awaji Maru. Picuda made rendezvous with Barb and Queenfish, then set course in company with these two submarines to terminate her third war patrol in the lagoon of Majuro Atoll on 3 October.

At Majuro, Picuda, now commanded by Evan T. Shepard, her final wartime skipper, formed a new wolf-pack with Queenfish and Barb, and departed 27 October. Topping off with fuel at Saipan, 1 November and 2 November, the wolf pack set course to range over the northern waters of the East China Sea, westward of Kyūshū. Picuda sank the 9,433 ton landing craft carrier Mayasan Maru on 17 November in the area southwest of Nagasaki. On 23 November, closing a convoy off the Korean Archipelago and stealing between two lead escorts, Picuda sank 6,933-ton cargo ship Shuyo Maru and 5,296-ton passenger-cargo ship Fukuju Maru. She departed her patrol area six days later and returned from her fourth patrol to moor in Apra Harbor, Guam, on 2 December.

On 29 December, Picuda put to sea for her fifth war patrol in the Formosa Straits and the East China Sea off the east coast of China from Shanghai to Kam Kit. On 7 January 1945, Picuda received a contact report from Barb and closed a convoy in the straits of Formosa to inflict severe damage with four torpedo hits on 10,045-ton tanker Munakata Maru. On the afternoon of 8 January, she again received a convoy contact report from Barb and slipped between two escorts of the starboard screen about four hours before midnight to pick out two large passenger-cargo ships. Three bow tubes fired at each target resulted in one hit on each. She swung and fired stern shots at a tanker, then discovered an escort dead ahead, 700 yards (640 m) range, and was forced to clear the area. The 2,854-ton coastal tanker Hikoshima Maru, hit by both Picuda and Barb, was disabled and ran aground. The cargo ship Meiho Maru had a similar experience, and severe damage was inflicted on 6,600-ton cargo ship Hisagawa Maru as well as 6,516-ton coastal tanker Manju Maru. Picuda having flashed a contact report as she cleared the area, set course for lifeguard station in support of the Third Fleet airstrikes on Formosa. In the early morning darkness of 29 January, Picuda made out at least three large ships in the rain and commenced tracking. The rain slackened as she approached dead ahead of a troop transport, overlapped by a cargo ship. One hit on the transport and two hits on the cargo ship were observed by Picuda's officer of the deck. The transport, almost dead in the water, commenced shrill whistle blasts and the mist dropped down to reveal the cargo ship enveloped in a huge cloud of steam and smoke. An enemy float plane forced Picuda to abandon the attack. The victim sunk in this attack was the 5,497-ton passenger-cargo ship Clyde Maru. Picuda reached Tanapag Harbor, Saipan 5–6 February and arrived at Pearl Harbor on 15 February.

Picuda spent much of her sixth war patrol on lifeguard station off the coast of China. She got underway from Pearl Harbor 15 March and cleared the replenishment base of Apra Harbor, Guam on 29 March. She entered her patrol area off Kii Suido on 2 April for uneventful lifeguard duty in support of B-29 Superfortress strikes. On 6 May, Picuda made rendezvous with sister ship Scabbardfish off the Nansei Shoto and received five crewmen from an Army B-29 bomber and debarked these survivors at Tanapag Harbor on 10 May, transferring them to the Headquarters of the Twenty-First Bomber Command. After voyage repairs alongside submarine tender Orion (AS-18), she departed 11 May for the East Coast of the United States. She stopped at Pearl Harbor, San Francisco, California, and transited the Panama Canal to arrive at the Portsmouth Naval Shipyard, Kittery, Maine, on 22 June.

Picuda received six battle stars for World War II service.

== Post-war ==
Picuda was assigned to Submarine Division 201, Squadron 20, US Atlantic Fleet. She remained in the Portsmouth Naval Shipyard for major overhaul until 18 October. She shifted to the Submarine Base at New London on 31 October for duty as a training ship for the Submarine School. Picuda put to sea from New London 12 November for a training cruise which included visits to Key West, Florida, and Havana, Cuba. Upon her return to New London, 26 November, she was assigned to the New London Group of 16 November (Inactive) Fleet. She shifted to the Portsmouth Naval Shipyard on 12 December to commence preservation incidental to being placed in inactive status. On 15 January 1946, Picuda was ordered to cease inactivation and report to the Second Fleet for duty as a unit of Submarine Division 81, Squadron 8, US Atlantic Fleet.

Picuda prepared for active service in the Portsmouth Naval Shipyard until 18 February and shifted to the Submarine Base at New London the next day. In company with five other submarines of the New London Group, she cleared that base 25 February for a tour of duty out of the Submarine Base at Balboa, Panama, returning by way of St. Thomas, to New London on 27 March. Picuda again entered the Portsmouth Naval Shipyard for inactivation on 27 March and was towed by a fleet tug to New London on 19 September 1946. She was placed out of commission, in reserve 25 September 1946.

Picuda was assigned to the New London Group of the Atlantic Reserve Fleet until late in the year 1952 when she was towed to the Portsmouth Naval Shipyard for snorkel conversion. She recommissioned 19 June 1953, Lieutenant Commander Ted N. Swain. Her conversion was complete by 24 August, and she shifted to the Submarine Base at New London. She reported for duty to Submarine Division 122, Squadron 12, US Atlantic Fleet.

Picuda steamed by way of Norfolk, Virginia, and Nassau, Bahamas to arrive at Key West, Florida, on 17 September. She was assigned to duty as a training ship for Submarine Refit Training Group and based her operations for that command at Key West through September 1959. This duty included almost daily exercises in the Key West operating area, visits to American ports on the Gulf of Mexico, and periodic training cruises to the waters of Cuba, Jamaica and Haiti. This service was intervened by special cruises from Key West and two tours of duty in the Mediterranean Sea. On her first special cruise, she operated off Norfolk from 24 April to 20 May 1954, participating in anti-submarine development exercises. On her second special cruise, she cleared Key West on 3 September and set course for waters of Northern Europe and the Mediterranean. She arrived at Londonderry Port, Northern Ireland, on 24 September for joint maneuvers with ships of the Royal Navy, then arrived at Gibraltar on 29 October to join units of the Sixth Fleet for Operation "Bright Bonfire." She returned to Londonderry Port 14 November to resume hunter-killer and other anti-submarine warfare tactics with units of the British Fleet, and cleared that port 25 November to resume her training duties at Key West, 11 December. She again sailed from Key West 6 January 1958 and arrived at Gibraltar 18 January. Her tour with the Sixth Fleet included participation in operation "ASCENDEX" and visits to the ports of Palma and Barcelona, Spain; Port de Monaco; and Genoa, Italy. She sailed from Gibraltar on 18 August and conducted hunter-killer exercises with destroyers in waters off Cuba and Jamaica before returning to Key West 11 October.

Picuda underwent overhaul in the Charleston Naval Shipyard from 13 October 1958 to 12 March 1959, followed by a brief period of refresher training in the New London, Connecticut–Newport, Rhode Island, area. She resumed her former duties at Key West on 27 March 1959 and put to sea from that port 1 June for her third Mediterranean tour. She touched at Norfolk 4 June and reached Gibraltar on 15 June. Operations in the Mediterranean during this tour included visits to Naples and Genoa, Italy; Marseille, France; and Lisbon, Portugal. She departed the latter port 26 August to resume training duties at Key West, Florida.

Picuda was brought to Pensacola, Florida during the 50th Anniversary of Naval Aviation and people were allowed to board her to see inside.

In 1961, Picuda visited Guantanamo Bay and underwent a five-month overhaul at Charleston Naval Shipyard. In 1962, Picuda visited Guantanamo Bay twice before circumnavigating South America, conducting joint operations with Brazil, Argentina, Uruguay, Chile and Peru. This operation was terminated due to the Cuban Missile Crisis, and Picuda proceeded to Key West, Florida. Picuda spent most of 1963 operating out of her homeport of Key West making one trip to Guantanamo Bay.

In 1964, Picuda operated out of Key West in the Atlantic and Caribbean, winding up the year with an overhaul in the Philadelphia Naval Shipyard. Picuda made another visit to Guantanamo Bay in 1965. She began 1966 with a three-month Mediterranean tour with the Sixth Fleet, participating in fleet ASW exercises and NATO exercises with French and Italian naval forces. She wound up the year with another visit to Guantanamo Bay.

In the 1967 North Atlantic NATO operation "Quick Pursuit," Picuda lost two men at sea (Lieutenant (junior grade) Jerry R. Alexander and Chief Torpedomans Mate Robert E. Small). She visited Bergen, Norway and Portsmouth, England before returning to Key West.

At the time of her decommissioning, Picuda held the record for being the longest serving submarine in the history of the US Navy. She had served 28 years, 11 months and 15 days. The previous record holder was USS O-4.

== Spanish Navy service ==
Transferred to Spain on 1 October 1972, former Picuda was renamed Narciso Monturiol (S33). The submarine was stricken from the US Navy Naval Vessel Register on 1 November 1974 and was purchased outright by Spain on 18 November 1974. In 1975, she was laid up with mechanical defects and finally deleted from the Armada Española on 30 April 1977, her name being shifted to former ex-Jallao (SS-368), which the Spanish had acquired.

== See also ==
- List of submarines of the Spanish Navy
