= Toa Maru =

Japanese transport ship sunk by a submarine off Gizo, Solomon Islands

Coordinates: 8°22′N 158°00′E

History

Japan
- Builder: Kawasaki Dockyard, Kobe
- Launched: 1934
- Fate: Sunk 25 November 1943

General characteristics
- Type: Transport ship
- Tonnage: 10,052 tons
- Length: 502.3 ft (153.1 m)
- Beam: 64.9 ft (19.8 m)
- Draft: 37.1 ft (11.3 m)
- Installed power: Kawasaki (MAN-type) diesel engine, 8,611 hp (6,421 kW)
- Speed: 19.5 knots (36.1 km/h; 22.4 mph)
- Capacity: 93,000 bbl (14,800 m^{3})
- Armament: 1 × 4.7 in (120 mm) LA gun

Toa Maru No 2 is a World War II Japanese transport ship sunk by the American submarine USS Searaven off Gizo, Solomon Islands on 25 November 1943.

== Diving destination ==
The hull of the wreck is intact and lying on its starboard side. The ships masts are still attached to the hull; however, recently the superstructure has fallen into the sand. The deepest point of the wreck is by the stern, which rests in 130 feet (40 m) of water; however, the top of the wreck can be reached at a depth of 40 feet (12 m). The contents of the ship's six cargo holds include sake bottles, ammunition magazines, two Type 95 tanks, motor-cycle sidecar combinations, and a fuel tanker. However, since the sinking, the ship has been salvaged removing some of the cargo and the ship's propeller.

In its 2010 travel guide, Diver magazine named the wreck as one of the top 20 wreck dives in the world.
