= USS Sunfish (SS-281) =

Submarine of the United States

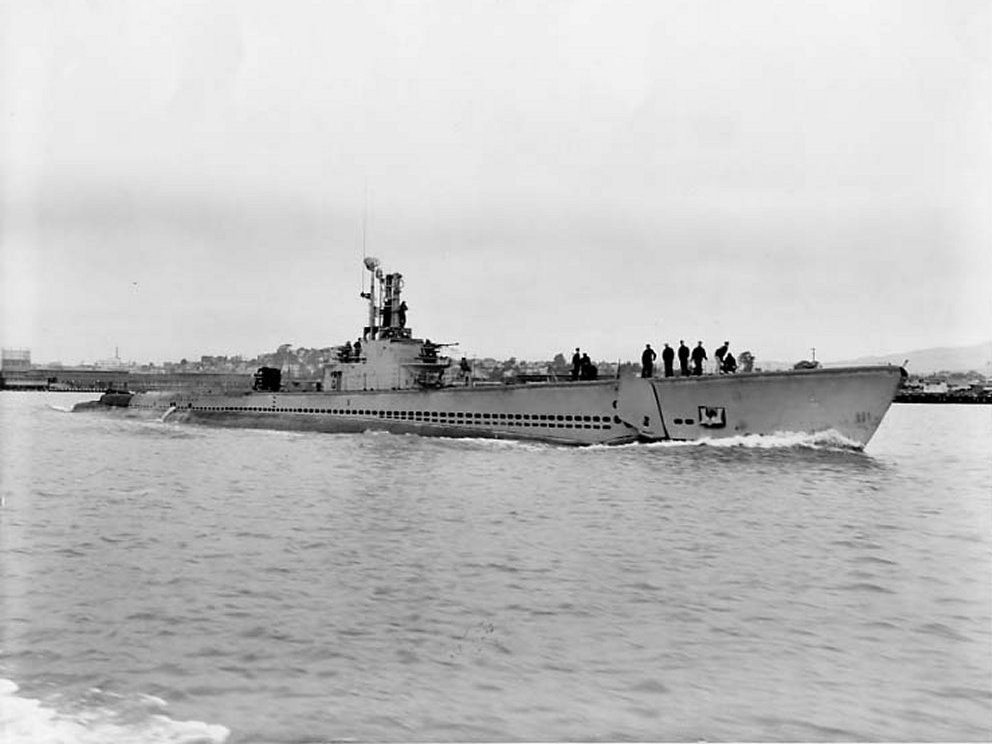
- USS Sunfish (SS-281) in the Mare Island Channel in 1945

History

United States
- Name: Sunfish
- Builder: Mare Island Naval Shipyard
- Laid down: 25 September 1941
- Launched: 2 May 1942
- Commissioned: 15 July 1942
- Decommissioned: 26 December 1945
- Stricken: 1 May 1960
- Fate: Sold for scrap, 15 December 1960

General characteristics
- Class & type: Gato-class diesel-electric submarine
- Displacement: 1,525 long tons (1,549 t) surfaced; 2,424 long tons (2,463 t) submerged
- Length: 311 ft 9 in (95.02 m)
- Beam: 27 ft 3 in (8.31 m)
- Draft: 17 ft 0 in (5.18 m) maximum
- Propulsion: 4 × Fairbanks-Morse Model 38D8-⅛ 9-cylinder opposed piston diesel engines driving electrical generators; 2 × 126-cell Sargo batteries; 4 × high-speed General Electric electric motors with reduction gears; two propellers; 5,400 shp (4.0 MW) surfaced; 2,740 shp (2.0 MW) submerged
- Speed: 21 knots (39 km/h) surfaced; 9 knots (17 km/h) submerged
- Range: 11,000 nautical miles (20,000 km) surfaced at 10 knots (19 km/h)
- Endurance: 48 hours at 2 knots (3.7 km/h) submerged; 75 days on patrol
- Test depth: 300 ft (90 m)
- Complement: 6 officers, 54 enlisted
- Armament: 10 × 21-inch (533 mm) torpedo tubes; 6 forward, 4 aft; 24 torpedoes; 1 × 3-inch (76 mm) / 50 caliber deck gun; Bofors 40 mm and Oerlikon 20 mm cannon

USS Sunfish (hull number SS-281), a Gato-class submarine, was the first ship of the United States Navy to be named for the ocean sunfish, Mola mola, a plectognath marine fish, having a deep body truncated behind, and high dorsal and anal fins.

== Construction and early career ==
Sunfish was laid down on 25 September 1941 by the Mare Island Navy Yard at Vallejo, California, launched on 2 May 1942, sponsored by Mrs. J. W. Fowler, and commissioned on 15 July 1942, Commander Richard W. Peterson in command.

Sunfish held her shakedown in the San Diego Bay area and then proceeded to San Francisco, California, for post-shakedown repairs. On 26 October 1942, she stood out to sea en route to the Pacific war zone.

== First and second war patrols, November 1942 – April 1943 ==
She arrived at Pearl Harbor, T.H. on 1 November, and departed on her first war patrol on 23 November. Her assigned patrol area was off the coasts of Honshū and Hokkaidō, Japan. The submarine laid a minefield at the entrance to Iseno Imi on the night of 16 December. On 18 December, torpedoed and damaged the Kyowa Maru. The patrol ended on 14 January 1943, upon her return to Midway Island.

Sunfish began her second patrol on 4 February, which took her into the East China Sea. She torpedoed a ship on the night of 4 March, setting it alight.

Two days later, she fired at a transport with a four-torpedo spread, with three explosions heard. When the submarine raised her periscope, a destroyer passed over the conning tower and attacked with depth charges causing minor damage. On the night of 13 March, Sunfish torpedoed and sunk the 3,262-ton Kosei Maru, a cargo ship in the approaches to Takarajima (Toro Shima in DANFS) in 29°04′N 129°17′E. (Note: Position in reference is southeast of the island. Kosei Maru was built as the World War I era Emergency Fleet Corporation Design 1023 type Buffalo Bridge (O/N 218821) in 1919 by Submarine Boat Corporation, Newark, N.J. sold to Japan.) The submarine returned to Pearl Harbor on 3 April.

== Third and fourth war patrols, May – September 1943 ==
Her third patrol was made from 4 May to 24 June in the shipping lanes near Truk Atoll. The Sunfish did not find any enemy shipping, so she reconnoitered Anguar Island on 23 May and shelled a refinery on Fais Island five days later.

From 28 July to 25 September, Sunfish patrolled in waters off Formosa. In two attacks on 13 August, she sank a tanker and attacked the converted gunboat Edo Maru which exploded, sending flames 200 feet (60 m) high. In the early-morning hours of 4 September, Sunfish dodged between lighted sampans to attack a 10-ship convoy, sinking the Kozon Maru, which also exploded.

== Fifth and sixth war patrols, October 1943 – March 1944 ==
Sunfish refitted at Pearl Harbor and sailed on 16 October to patrol area northeast of Formosa. She returned to Pearl Harbor on 14 December 1943 without finding any worthy targets.

On 14 January 1944, Sunfish set off under her new commanding officer Commander Edward E. Shelby to patrol the shipping lanes between the Caroline and Mariana Islands. She made a photographic reconnaissance of Kusaie and another atoll in the Carolines between 21 January and 30 January. On 23 February, the submarine made four attacks on a convoy, sinking the Kunishima Maru and the Shinyubari Maru with a combined tonnage of 9,437 tons of enemy shipping. When she returned to Pearl Harbor on 7 March, she was routed onward to San Francisco for an overhaul, which was completed in early June.

== Seventh and eighth war patrols, June – September 1944 ==
Following her overhaul, the Sunfish returned to Pearl Harbor and departed for her seventh war patrol on 22 June in the Kuril Islands area. She sank the passenger-cargo ship Shanmai Maru on the night of 5 July. The next day, the submarine engaged and destroyed a fleet of 14 sampans and trawlers with her deck guns. Sunfish mistakenly sank the Soviet merchant ship Ob on 6 July and sank the 6,284-ton cargo ship Taihei Maru on the morning of 9 July. Sunfish steamed to Midway for a refit period from 1 August to 19 August.

Sunfish began her eighth war patrol on 20 August when she departed Midway for the Yellow Sea. On 10 September she intercepted a convoy coming out of Tsushima Strait, sinking Chihaya Maru and damaging several other targets. On the night of 13 September, the Sunfish attacked another convoy sinking the Etashima Maru with damage claimed to other targets, including one ship left with her decks awash. The patrol ended at Pearl Harbor on 27 September.

== Ninth war patrol, October – December 1944 ==
Sunfish returned to the Yellow Sea on 23 October as part of a "wolf pack" that included Peto (SS-265) and Spadefish (SS-411). On 17 November, the Sunfish sighted a convoy of eight ships led by the 21,000-ton escort carrier Shinyo. The carrier quickly passed out of range of the Sunfish, which signalled its find to the other members of the wolfpack. The Sunfish attacked the remaining ships of the convoy, sinking two troopships; the Edogawa Maru with 2,113 lives lost; and the Seisho Maru with 448 lives lost. The Spadefish torpedoed and sank the Shinyo, with 1,130 lives lost. As the battle continued, the Peto sank Aisakasan Maru and Chinkai Maru, while Spadefish sank Submarine Chaser No. 156.

On 29 November, the Spadefish sank Daiboshi Maru. The following day the Sunfish sank the transport Dairen Maru. The patrol ended at Majuro, Marshall Islands, on 19 December 1944, with the wolfpack having sunk a total of 59,000 tons of Japanese shipping.

== Tenth and eleventh war patrols, January – April 1945 ==
Sunfish stood out of Majuro on 15 January 1945 to patrol in the East China and Yellow Seas. On 20 February, she collided with an ice floe damaging both periscopes, forcing a premature end to the patrol. The Sunfish arrived at Apra Harbor, Guam, on 27 February, for refit and repairs.

Sunfish began her eleventh, and last, war patrol on 31 March 1945 with Commander John W. Reed now in command, patrolling off Honshū and Hokkaidō. She operated in the approaches to Ominato in April. On the 9th, she damaged a ship which managed to speed away and enter a protected harbor. Five days later, Sunfish launched three torpedoes at a merchantman; but all missed. The submarine carried out a daylight attack on 16 April, sinking the transport Manryu Maru and the frigate Coast Defense Vessel No. 73. She expended her last torpedoes three days later in night-radar attacks, sinking Kaiho Maru and Taisei Maru. Sunfish returned to Pearl Harbor on 28 April and departed for the United States two days later.

== Postwar ==
Sunfish was in the Mare Island Naval Shipyard from 7 May to 31 July for an overhaul and returned to Pearl Harbor on 9 August. She was preparing for another patrol when hostilities with Japan ceased. The submarine sailed out of Pearl Harbor on 29 August en route to the West Coast. She arrived at Mare Island on 5 September for inactivation, and was decommissioned there on 26 December 1945. She was the first submarine of the Gato class to be decommissioned after the war. Sunfish remained out of commission, serving as a classroom for naval reserve units until she was struck from the Navy List on 1 May 1960.

== Honors and awards ==
Sunfish received nine battle stars for World War II.
