= Japanese escort ship Tsushima =

History

Empire of Japan
- Name: Tsushima
- Builder: Nihon Kokan, Tsurumi
- Laid down: 20 June 1942
- Launched: 20 March 1943
- Completed: 28 July 1943
- Fate: Ceded to Republic of China (Taiwan)

Taiwan
- Name: Lin An
- Acquired: ceded to Republic of China (Taiwan) 31 July 1947
- Fate: Scrapped 1963

General characteristics
- Class & type: Etorofu-class escort ship
- Displacement: 870 long tons (884 t)
- Length: 77.7 m (255 ft)
- Beam: 9.1 m (29 ft 10 in)
- Draught: 3.05 m (10 ft)
- Speed: 19.7 knots (22.7 mph; 36.5 km/h)
- Complement: 150
- Armament: 3 × 120 mm (4.7 in)/45 cal DP guns; Up to 15 × Type 96 25 mm (0.98 in) AA guns; 6 × depth charge throwers; Up to 60 × depth charges

Tsushima (対馬) was one of fourteen Etorofu-class escort ships built for the Imperial Japanese Navy during World War II.

== Background and description ==
The Etorofu class was an improved version of the preceding Shimushu class with a greater emphasis on anti-submarine warfare. The ships measured 77.72 meters (255 ft 0 in) overall, with a beam of 9.1 meters (29 ft 10 in) and a draft of 3.05 meters (10 ft 0 in). They displaced 880 metric tons (870 long tons) at standard load and 1,040 metric tons (1,020 long tons) at deep load. The ships had two diesel engines, each driving one propeller shaft, which were rated at a total of 4,200 brake horsepower (3,100 kW) for a speed of 19.7 knots (36.5 km/h; 22.7 mph). The ships had a range of 8,000 nautical miles (15,000 km; 9,200 mi) at a speed of 16 knots (30 km/h; 18 mph).

The main armament of the Etorofu class consisted of three Type 3 120-millimeter (4.7 in) guns in single mounts, one superfiring pair aft and one mount forward of the superstructure. They were built with four Type 96 25-millimeter (1.0 in) anti-aircraft guns in two twin-gun mounts, but the total was increased to 15 guns by August 1943. 36 depth charges were stowed aboard initially, but this later increased by August 1943 to 60 depth charges with a Type 97 81-millimeter (3.2 in) trench mortar and six depth charge throwers. They received Type 22 and Type 13 radars and Type 93 sonar in 1943–44.

== Construction and career ==
Tsushima was launched by Tsurumi on 20 March 1943 and completed on 15 August. She served on repatriation duties until 1947 when she was turned over to the Republic of China Navy on 31 July and renamed Lin An.
