= Japanese aircraft carrier Shin'yō =

Escort carrier of the Imperial Japanese Navy

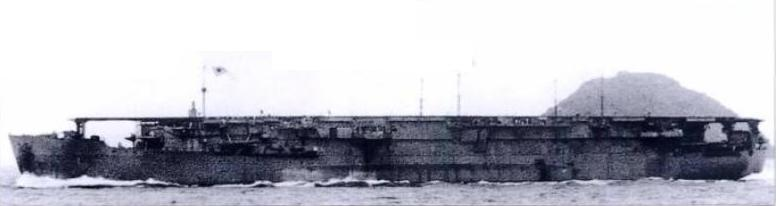
- Shin'yō in November 1943

History

Empire of Japan
- Name: Shin'yō
- Builder: AG Weser
- Launched: 14 December 1934
- Acquired: 1942
- Commissioned: 15 November 1943
- Fate: Sunk, 17 November 1944
- Notes: Converted from the German liner Scharnhorst

General characteristics
- Class & type: Unique escort carrier
- Displacement: Standard: 17,500 t (17,200 long tons); Full load: 20,586 t (20,261 long tons)
- Length: 189.36 m (621 ft 3 in)
- Beam: 26 m (85 ft)
- Draft: 8.18 m (26 ft 10 in)
- Installed power: 26,000 shp (19,000 kW)
- Propulsion: 2 × AEG steam turbines; turbo-electric transmission; 2 × screw propellers
- Speed: 22 kn (41 km/h; 25 mph)
- Complement: 942
- Armament: Upon Completion In 1943: 8 ×127 mm (5 in) dual purpose guns; 30 × 25 mm (1 in) anti-aircraft guns; After 1944 Refit: 8 × 127 mm dual purpose guns; 50 × 25 mm anti-aircraft guns
- Aircraft carried: 33 (27 useful, 6 spares)
- Aviation facilities: 2 × elevators

Shin'yō (神鷹, "Divine Hawk") was an escort carrier operated by the Imperial Japanese Navy, converted from the German ocean liner Scharnhorst. The liner had been trapped in Kure, Japan following the outbreak of World War II in Europe, which prevented any attempt for the ship to return to Germany. The Japanese Navy then purchased the ship, and after the Battle of Midway in June 1942, decided to convert her into an aircraft carrier. Conversion work lasted from 1942 to late 1943, and Shin'yō was commissioned into the Japanese Navy in November 1943. After entering service, Shin'yō was employed as a convoy escort in the western Pacific. She served in this capacity for less than a year; in November 1944, the US submarine Spadefish torpedoed Shin'yō while she was en route to Singapore. As many as four torpedoes hit the ship and detonated her aviation fuel tanks. The resulting explosion destroyed the ship and killed most of her crew.

== Background and conversion ==
Scharnhorst was a passenger ship operated by Norddeutscher Lloyd in the 1930s. She was trapped in Japan after the outbreak of World War II in Europe in September 1939. The Japanese Navy purchased the ship on 7 February 1942, under the agreement they would pay Norddeutscher Lloyd twice the value of the ship after the end of the war. The ship was intended for use as a troop ship, but after the Japanese defeat at the Battle of Midway, the Navy decided to convert her into an escort carrier.

Conversion work on Scharnhorst began in September 1942 in the Kure Navy Dockyard. Steel from the uncompleted hull of the canceled fourth Yamato-class battleship was used in the conversion process. Work lasted until December 1943, and the rebuilt ship was commissioned into the Japanese Navy on 15 December 1943. Scharnhorst's design was similar to the Japanese passenger liners of the Nitta Maru class, which were also converted into the Taiyō-class escort carriers, so her conversion followed a similar plan. The main differences were retention of the original propulsion machinery, and addition of external bulges which helped increase stability.

== Characteristics ==
As rebuilt, Shin'yō was 606 ft 11 in (184.99 m) long between perpendiculars and 621 ft 3 in (189.36 m) overall. She had a beam of 84 ft (26 m) and a draft of 26 ft 10 in (8.18 m). A 590.5 by 80.5 ft (180.0 by 24.5 m) flight deck was installed, along with a pair of elevators and a single large hangar. This arrangement allowed for 27 combat aircraft and six spare airframes, for a total of 33 aircraft.

The ship was powered by a pair of geared turbines that were supplied with steam by four boilers. The propulsion system produced 26,000 shaft horsepower (19,000 kW) and a top speed of 22 knots (41 km/h; 25 mph). At a speed of 19 kn (35 km/h; 22 mph), the ship could steam for approximately 9,000 nautical miles (17,000 km; 10,000 mi). The original high-pressure, high-temperature, oil-fired boilers proved to be highly problematic and so the Japanese replaced them shortly after Shin'yō was completed. Steering was controlled by a single rudder.

Shin'yō was armed with eight 127 mm (5 in) Type 89 dual-purpose guns in four twin mounts. She also carried thirty 25 mm (1 in) Type 96 anti-aircraft guns in ten triple mounts. Later, twelve additional 25 mm guns in single mounts were added. When Shin'yō was refitted in July 1944, eight more 25 mm guns were added, bringing the total to fifty.

== Service history ==
On 1 November 1943, Shin'yō was readied for sea trials and ran a shake-down cruise. The ship was commissioned into the fleet on 15 November 1943, and was subsequently assigned to the Grand Escort Command on 20 December. For the first six months of 1944, the ship conducted training maneuvers in the Home Islands. On 13 July 1944, she escorted the convoy Hi-69, including the escort carriers Taiyō and Kaiyō, which were carrying additional aircraft for the Philippines. Shin'yō was tasked with providing aerial cover for the convoy. The convoy arrived on 20 July; on 25 July, Shin'yō left with another convoy, bound for Singapore. The ship arrived on 31 July, and departed again four days later with the convoy Hi-70. The convoy consisted of eight transports, headed for Moji; Shin'yō was joined by a pair of light cruisers and several smaller craft. The convoy arrived on 15 August, while Shin'yō put in at Kure the following day.

On 8 September, Shin'yō escorted the convoy Hi-75, consisting of nine transports and several destroyers and smaller craft, bound for Singapore. On 13 September, the convoy stopped briefly in Takao, Formosa, before departing later that day. The convoy arrived on 22 September. Another convoy, Hi-76, left Singapore for Moji on 3 October, with Shin'yō and several destroyers escorting it. The convoy temporarily stopped in Mihara on 19–20 October; on 22 October, Shin'yō departed from the convoy and proceeded to the Saiki airbase, arriving on 24 October. The following day, she left for Kure. While there, she replenished fuel and supplies. On 7 November, she was ordered to cover the return of the carrier Jun'yō.

On 9 November, she was assigned to convoy Hi-81, carrying aircraft for the Philippines. Fourteen B5N "Kate" torpedo bombers were assigned to the ship for the operation. The convoy left Japan on 14 November. The escort consisted of six destroyers, protecting seven troopships carrying an army division and a tanker. On 15 November, while in the East China Sea, a US submarine sank one of the transports; two days later, another transport was sunk and the tanker was damaged. Later that night, Shin'yō was torpedoed and sunk by the submarine USS Spadefish. The submarine hit her with as many as four torpedoes in quick succession. The carrier's unarmored fuel tanks exploded and started a massive fire that destroyed the ship and killed most of her crew. Only 70 men from her crew of 1,200 officers and men survived. Shin'yō quickly sank stern first. Spadefish attempted to attack the convoy again, but was driven off by the escorts. Shin'yō was formally stricken from the naval register on 10 January 1945.
