= USS Peto =

Submarine of the United States

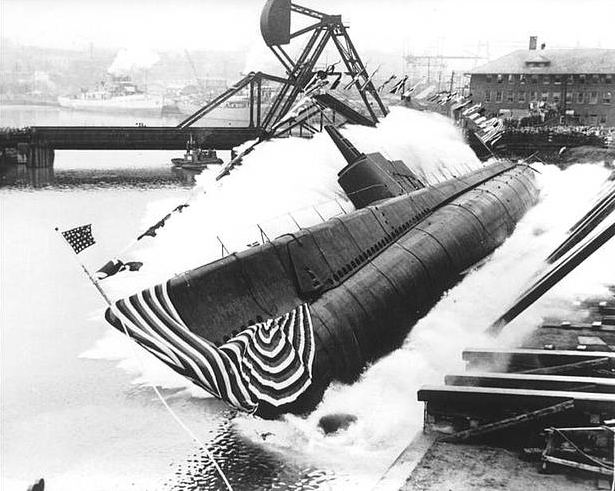

History

United States
- Builder: Manitowoc Shipbuilding Company, Manitowoc, Wisconsin
- Laid down: 15 June 1941
- Launched: 30 April 1942
- Commissioned: 21 November 1942
- Decommissioned: 25 December 1942
- Recommissioned: January 1943
- Decommissioned: 25 June 1946
- Stricken: 1 August 1960
- Fate: Sold for scrap on 29 November 1960

General characteristics
- Class & type: Gato-class diesel-electric submarine
- Displacement: 1,525 tons (1,549 t) surfaced, 2,424 tons (2,460 t) submerged
- Length: 311 ft 9 in (95.02 m)
- Beam: 27 ft 3 in (8.31 m)
- Draft: 17 ft (5.2 m) maximum
- Propulsion: 4 × General Motors Model 16-248 V16 Diesel engines driving electric generators; 2 × 126-cell Sargo batteries; 4 × high-speed General Electric electric motors with reduction gears; two propellers; 5,400 shp (4.0 MW) surfaced; 2,740 shp (2.0 MW) submerged
- Speed: 21 kn (39 km/h) surfaced, 9 kn (17 km/h) submerged
- Range: 11,000 nmi (20,000 km) @ 10 kn (19 km/h) aurfaced
- Endurance: 48 hours @ 2 kn (3.7 km/h) submerged, 75 days on patrol
- Test depth: 300 ft (91 m)
- Complement: 6 officers, 54 enlisted
- Armament: 10 × 21-inch (533 mm) torpedo tubes; 6 forward, 4 aft; 24 torpedoes; 1 × 3-inch (76 mm) / 50 caliber deck gun; Bofors 40 mm and Oerlikon 20 mm cannon

USS Peto (SS-265), a Gato-class submarine, was a ship of the United States Navy named for the peto, a sharp-nosed tropical fish of the mackerel family.

== Construction and commissioning ==
Peto was laid down on 18 June 1941 by the Manitowoc Shipbuilding Company at Manitowoc, Wisconsin; launched on 30 April 1942 sponsored by Mrs. E. A. Lofquist; and commissioned on 21 November 1942, Lieutenant Commander William T. Nelson in command.

== Service history ==
=== World War II ===
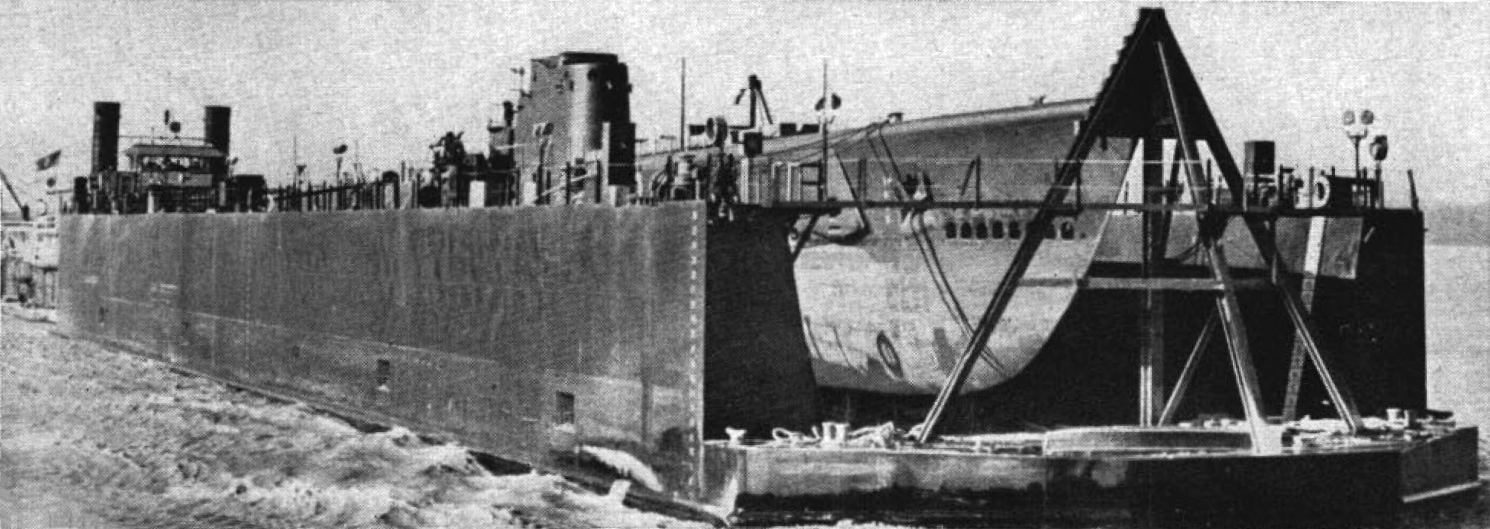
USS Peto (SS-265) being transported down the Mississippi River c1943

Late in December 1942, Peto decommissioned, was loaded on a barge, and departed Manitowoc for New Orleans, Louisiana, the first submarine to traverse the mid-western waterways to reach New Orleans and the sea from the building yards. This was done because the Chain of Rocks Waterway as well as some of the passages near Chicago were only 9 feet (2.7 m) deep, whereas the minimum draft of the submarine was 12 feet (3.7 m). Peto recommissioned, completed fitting out and shakedown, transited the Panama Canal, and arrived at Brisbane, Australia, on 14 March 1943.

==== First war patrol ====
Peto departed Brisbane for her first war patrol on 2 April 1943. She reconnoitered Greenwich Island for shipping on 13 April without finding any targets. That night she proceeded toward the equator to cover the Truk-Kavieng shipping route, arriving on station the next day. A southbound Truk-Rabaul convoy came into view on the morning of 17 April, consisting of two destroyers, two medium cargo ships, and one small auxiliary ship. However, before Peto attacked, the trailing destroyer detected her and forced her to dive. She withstood nine depth charges without damage.

On 5 May, she made a night attack conducted by sound and radar alone, firing three torpedoes at a target for one possible hit. After patrolling off Cape Oxford on New Britain, Peto headed for Brisbane on 20 May 1943.

==== Second war patrol ====
Peto departed on her second war patrol on 10 June 1943. On 29 June, she fired two torpedoes at a small auxiliary. One torpedo hit near the bow, breaking the ship in two. On 7 July, she sighted an eastbound tanker similar to Nippon Maru with two escorting destroyers. Peto maneuvered and fired three torpedoes; two hits causing severe damage. She returned to Brisbane on 4 August 1943.

==== Third war patrol ====
On 1 September 1943, Peto set out on her third war patrol, assigned a patrol area north of the Bismarck Archipelago. After reconnoitering Nauru Harbor, she patrolled the route between Truk and Nauru for five days without contact. On 9 September, an Allied maritime patrol aircraft mistakenly attacked her with a depth charge 310 nautical miles (570 km; 360 mi) north-northeast of Buka on Bougainville Island in the Solomon Islands at 03°49′S 158°26′E. The depth charge missed by a wide margin, and Peto submerged to 200 feet (61 m) and avoided damage.

Peto moved to the Truk-Kavieng-Rabaul traffic routes on 20 September, and two days later, sighted five escorted ships headed toward Rabaul. She lost her attack chance at the last moment when the Japanese ships made a radical change of course. While Peto attempted to close for a night attack, an alert escort only 7,000 yd (6,400 m) away detected her. The Japanese ship opened fire on her, forcing her to crash-dive.

From 24 to 26 September 1943, Peto patrolled off the Admiralty Islands without contacts. On 1 October, she sighted three medium cargo ships with only one submarine chaser as escort, and fired six torpedoes, hitting two of the ships. Post-war investigation revealed that Peto sank both Tonei Maru and Kinkasan Maru. Peto returned to Brisbane on 21 October 1943.

==== Fourth war patrol ====
Underway again on 14 November 1943 to begin her fourth war patrol, Peto fueled at Tulagi, and set out for her patrol area on 24 November 1943. On 1 December, she sighted a Japanese convoy consisting of two passenger-cargo vessels with three small escorts. She fired six torpedoes at Konei Maru, which broke up and sank. On 9 December, while firing on a ship in a convoy, her target apparently saw the torpedoes coming and turned toward them to avoid being hit. An escort then drove Peto down and administered a thorough depth-charging.

Boang Island On 19 December Peto under Commander Nelson received orders to return to Tulagi. On Christmas Day a reconnaissance team of ten US specialists an Australian Coastwatcher (Captain H. Murray) his Sergeant (Bill Dolby) and their four native scouts were embarked. On Boxing Day they sailed arriving off Boang Island part of the Tanga Island Group four days later. That night Captain Murray with four specialists and two scouts were sent into the Island by rubber boat. If they landed unopposed (there was a small enemy garrison of about ten on the Island) they would signal the submarine by flash light signal and the rest of the team would follow them in. The landing was unopposed but the signal to the "Peto" was misinterpreted that something was wrong and the second boat was not sent in. For the next day the specialists conducted the reconnaissance looking for possible sites for airfields, landing sites, etc. Towards the end of the day they became aware that an enemy patrol was after them. Captain Murray set up an ambush that killed some and wounded others who did manage to escape through the jungle. That night despite atrocious weather conditions they made it safely back to the "Peto". Returning to Tulagi Commander Nelson made Captain Murray an honorary member of the US Submarine Service. In return the team presented the "Peto" with a Japanese machine gun they had captured during the ambush. In turn the machine gun was sent to the Manitowoc Shipbuilding Company that had built the "Peto".

==== Fifth war patrol ====
On 2 February 1944, Peto set course for Tulagi, arriving there on 5 February for fuel before departing the following day for her patrol area. On 10 February Peto headed for a rendezvous with the submarine USS Cero (SS-225).

On 19 February 1944, Peto attacked a merchant ship with three escorts and one of her torpedoes struck home. The target was immediately engulfed in black smoke and her crew heard depth charges in the distance. Peto surfaced and found the escorts depth-charging Cero's position. After closing Cero slowly, she fired two rounds from her 3 in (76.2 mm) deck gun at the escorts, and as the escorts returned fire she withdrew, giving Cero a chance to escape unharmed.

On 23 February 1944, Peto headed for Langemak Bay to refuel and obtain spare parts, arriving there on 27 February. On 1 March, she headed for her patrol area again, and on 3 March made an unsuccessful attack on a Japanese merchant ship. The next day, she fired six torpedoes at a cargo ship and then went deep to listen as escorts were near. The crew heard two hits, followed by a loud, deep explosion. Three minutes later breaking-up noises began, and her crew heard splashes from debris falling in the water for several minutes. The escorts dropped 13 depth charges before giving up. Peto had sunk Kayo Maru. On 16 March, Peto set course for Midway Atoll in the Northwestern Hawaiian Islands, where she arrived on 25 March 1944. She departed for Pearl Harbor, Hawaii, the same day, arriving there on 29 March 1944.

==== Sixth war patrol ====
On 28 April 1944, Peto, along with the submarine USS Perch (SS-313) and an escorting surface warship, departed Pearl Harbor for her patrol area south of Formosa. She departed from Midway on 2 May 1944, with Perch and the submarine USS Picuda (SS-382) joining her wolf pack. Arriving in her patrol area, Peto began looking for shipping worthy of her torpedoes. She made only six ship contacts during the entire patrol and couldn't obtain a favorable attack position on any of them due to Japanese aircraft in the vicinity or shallow water. She returned to Midway on 15 June 1944 and later that day departed for Pearl Harbor with the submarine USS Kingfish (SS-234), arriving on 19 June.

==== June–October 1944 ====
On 21 June 1944, Peto headed for San Francisco, California, for major alterations at the Bethlehem Steel Company shipyards. On 29 September 1944, Peto headed westward again, reaching Pearl Harbor on 7 October 1944 and arriving at Midway Atoll on 27 October.

==== Seventh war patrol ====
At Midway, Peto joined the submarines USS Spadefish (SS-411) and USS Sunfish (SS-281), forming a wolf pack designated Task Group 17.13. The submarines arrived in their assigned patrol area in the Yellow Sea 9 November 1944.

On 12 November 1944, Peto heard a loud explosion and saw a large flash. A burning ship with hull down was seen to the east and it was assumed the submarine USS Barb (SS-220), which was also in the vicinity, had connected. Peto sent her crew to their battle stations and sent four torpedoes at the nearest ship of a Japanese convoy. Two hits were heard and the target slowed down and dropped back, though it did not stop. Peto fired her remaining two forward torpedoes at a second target and swung around to bring her stern torpedo tubes to bear. She fired four torpedoes at the third target. The torpedoes fired from the bow tubes struck home as the leading ship, Tatsuaki Maru, blew up and promptly sank. Two hits were heard on the third target, which immediately was engulfed in dense black smoke. Peto then scurried for cover, as it was getting light fast. She took her last look at the third target and noted that it was ablaze.

On 18 November 1944, Peto made contact with one ship which apparently was lost and without an escort. She fired three torpedoes, the first hitting and setting the target ablaze. The second missed but the third hit and the target blew up and burned much brighter. Peto came around for a coup de grace but saw that it was unnecessary, as only the stern of Aisakasan Maru was above the water, still burning like an inferno. She contacted another Japanese ship, a cargo ship dead in the water with two escorts nearby, and sent three torpedoes streaking after it. One torpedo hit the target and Chinkai Mara sank in four minutes. On 29 November, Peto attacked a small coastal tanker with her last torpedoes and then headed for home.

Peto arrived at Guam on 6 December 1944 and underwent a refit there. She then departed for Pearl Harbor, where she arrived on 2 January 1945.

==== Eighth war patrol ====
Peto departed Pearl Harbor in company with the submarines USS Thresher (SS-200), USS Shad (SS-235), and USS Tilefish (SS-307) on 31 January 1945, topped off with fuel at Saipan on 12 February, and headed for her patrol area the following day. However, she met no suitable targets during her patrol, and she returned to Midway on 9 April 1945.

==== Ninth war patrol ====
On 4 May 1945, Peto got underway for her ninth war patrol. Off Marcus Island on 12 May, she guided Allied pilots to their targets. None of the planes were hit. On 21 May, she closed to the coast of Manus Island and took pictures of Japanese shore installations. The next day, she headed for Guam, arriving there on 19 June 1945.

==== Tenth war patrol ====
On 14 July 1945, Peto stood out of Guam on her tenth and last war patrol. On 24 July, she rescued two pilots from the aircraft carrier USS Lexington (CV-16), one with gunshot wounds in both legs. On 25 July her guns sank a sampan, and the same day she saved nine more downed aviators. On 10 August she picked up a Royal Navy Fleet Air Arm pilot from the aircraft carrier HMS Formidable. On 15 August 1945, she was assigned a life guard station to cover air strikes on the Japanese Home Islands, but hostilities with Japan ceased that day.

=== Post-World War II ===
On 16 August 1945, Peto headed for the Panama Canal Zone, arriving on 15 September. On 17 September, she departed for New Orleans, Louisiana, arriving on 21 September 1945.

Peto joined the Atlantic Fleet and on 25 June 1946 was placed out of commission in reserve, berthed at Naval Submarine Base New London in New London, Connecticut. She remained in reserve until November 1956, when she became a United States Naval Reserve training submarine for the Eighth Naval District. She was struck from the Naval Vessel Register on 1 August 1960 and sold on 10 November 1960 for scrapping.

== Awards ==
Peto received eight battle stars for World War II service.
