= USS Spadefish (SS-411) =

Submarine of the United States

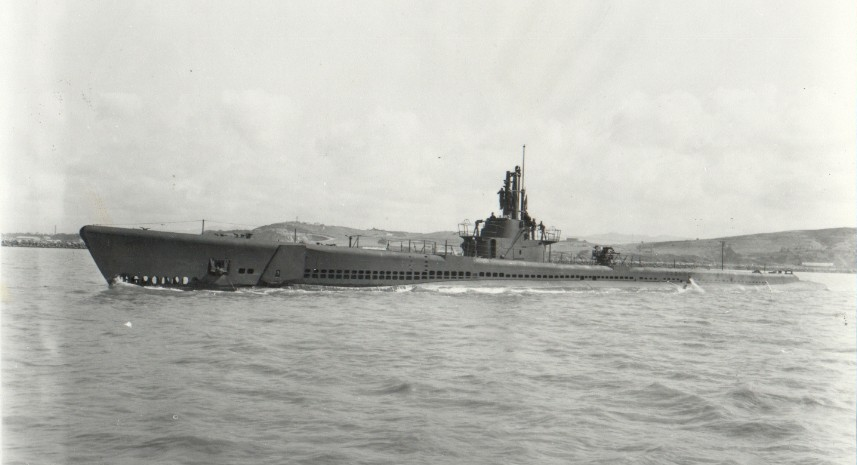
- USS Spadefish (SS-411) off Mare Island Navy Yard on 11 May 1944.

History

United States
- Name: Spadefish
- Namesake: Spadefish
- Builder: Mare Island Naval Shipyard
- Laid down: 27 May 1943
- Launched: 8 January 1944
- Commissioned: 9 March 1944
- Decommissioned: 3 May 1946
- Stricken: 1 April 1967
- Fate: Sold for scrap, 17 October 1969

General characteristics
- Class & type: Balao class diesel-electric submarine
- Displacement: 1,526 tons (1,550 t) surfaced; 2,424 tons (2,463 t) submerged
- Length: 311 ft 10 in (95.05 m)
- Beam: 27 ft 4 in (8.33 m)
- Draft: 16 ft 10 in (5.13 m) maximum
- Propulsion: 4 × Fairbanks-Morse Model 38D8-⅛ 10-cylinder opposed piston diesel engines driving electrical generators; 2 × 126-cell Sargo batteries; 4 × high-speed General Electric electric motors with reduction gears; two propellers; 5,400 shp (4.0 MW) surfaced; 2,740 shp (2.0 MW) submerged
- Speed: 20.25 knots (38 km/h) surfaced; 8.75 knots (16 km/h) submerged
- Range: 11,000 nautical miles (20,000 km) surfaced at 10 knots (19 km/h)
- Endurance: 48 hours at 2 knots (3.7 km/h) submerged; 75 days on patrol
- Test depth: 400 ft (120 m)
- Complement: 10 officers, 70–71 enlisted
- Armament: 10 × 21-inch (533 mm) torpedo tubes; 6 forward, 4 aft; 24 torpedoes; 1 × 5-inch (127 mm) / 25 caliber deck gun; Bofors 40 mm and Oerlikon 20 mm cannon

USS Spadefish (hull number SS/AGSS-411) was a Balao-class submarine, the first ship of the United States Navy to be named for the spadefish.

Although she was commissioned late in the war and spent only one year in the Pacific war zone, she was able to run up a record of 88,091 tons in 21 ships and numerous trawlers sunk. Decommissioned in 1946, Spadefish was struck from the naval register in 1967 and sold for scrap in 1969.

== Construction and commissioning ==
Spadefish was laid down on 27 May 1943 at the Mare Island Navy Yard in Vallejo, California. She was launched on 8 January 1944, sponsored by Mrs. Mildred Florence Scanland (née Boyd), wife of Commodore Francis W. Scanland, and was commissioned on 9 March 1944, Commander Gordon W. Underwood in command.

== Service history ==
=== First war patrol, July – September 1944 ===
Following shakedown training along the coast of California, Spadefish departed San Francisco on 14 June and arrived at Pearl Harbor on 22 June. On 23 July, she got underway from Pearl Harbor for her maiden war patrol, as a member of a coordinated attack group with Picuda (SS-382) and Redfish (SS-395).

On 19 August, while patrolling in Philippine waters off the northwest coast of Luzon, Spadefish torpedoed and sank her first enemy target the 9,589-ton, passenger-cargo ship Tamatsu Maru. Three days later, she trailed three large tankers through Babuyan Channel along the northern Luzon coast; closed range; and fired two spreads of torpedoes, sinking the 10,023-ton tanker Hakko Maru No. 2, and damaging a second tanker that, protected by a destroyer, limped back to a shallow cove off Luzon.

For several hours into the next day, Spadefish attempted to get around the escort to attack the damaged ship anchored in the cove. The submarine finally let go with four stern torpedoes at the destroyer, but the enemy zigged clear and proceeded to depth charge the entire area. Having only three torpedoes remaining, Spadefish set course for Tanapag Harbor, Saipan, to replenish her supply.

On 8 September, Spadefish was patrolling in waters of Nansei Shoto when she contacted a convoy of eight cargo ships. During a daring night surface attack, she fired a total of 20 torpedoes, sinking cargo ships Nichiman Maru, Nichian Maru, Shinten Maru, and Shokei Maru and damaging another. The following morning, she fired her final four torpedoes at an escort guarding the stricken ship; but they ran under the target. The submarine's only reward on this occasion was a rain of depth charges.

Although she was out of torpedoes, Spadefish continued to trail the remaining ships of the convoy that first took refuge in the harbor of Ishigaki; and then, in company with five escorts, continued their voyage. Spadefish terminated her first war patrol at Pearl Harbor on 24 September, having sunk six enemy ships for a total of over 31,500 tons. With the additional 33,000 tons sunk by her sister submarines, the coordinated attack group accounted for a total of 13 ships and over 64,000 tons of enemy shipping.

=== Second war patrol, October – December 1944 ===
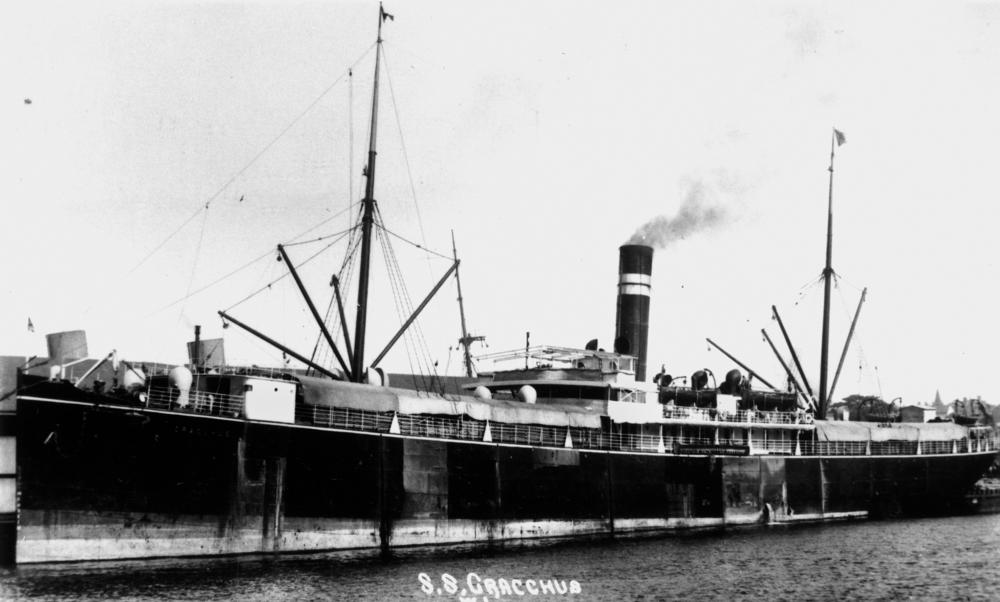
In the Yellow Sea in November 1944 Spadefish sank the 1902 cargo ship Daiboshi Maru No. 6. This photo shows her as the British ship Gracchus, which was her name until Japanese owners bought her in 1923.

On 23 October, she got underway from Pearl Harbor for her second war patrol, in a coordinated attack group with Sunfish (SS-281) and Peto (SS-265). While patrolling in the Yellow Sea on 14 November, she torpedoed and sank the Japanese cargo ship Gyokupy Maru.

Three days later, she contacted an enemy convoy headed directly at her. After letting the convoy pass overhead, she surfaced after darkness had set in and commenced an "end around". She first fired six torpedoes at the prime target, the 21,000-ton escort aircraft carrier Shin'yō; and then turned rapidly to port and fired four stern torpedoes at a tanker. The unarmored fuel tanks of the escort carrier Shinyo exploded and started a huge fire that destroyed the ship and killed most of her crew. Only 70 men from her crew of 1,200 officers and men survived. Damage to the tanker could not be confirmed.

Later that same night, Spadefish drove in for another attack, firing four stern torpedoes at Submarine Chaser No. 156. As the enemy disappeared in the resulting explosion, the submarine quickly evaded other escorts and left the vicinity.

Spadefish sank the fourth ship of her second patrol on 29 November by torpedoing the 3,760-ton cargo ship Daiboshi Maru No. 6; and then concluded her patrol at Majuro Atoll in the Marshall Islands on 12 December.

=== Third war patrol, January – February 1945 ===
After spending the holidays at Majuro, Spadefish departed on 6 January 1945 for her third war patrol, conducted with Pompon (SS-267), Atule (SS-403), and Jallao (SS-368) in the Yellow Sea. On the day of her departure, two United States Marine Corps SBD Dauntless dive bombers of Marine Scouting Squadron 245 (VMSB-245) mistook her for a Japanese submarine and dropped two depth charges on her after she submerged off Majuro. She suffered only superficial damage and no casualties, and she proceeded to her patrol area.

On 28 January 1945, Spadefish intercepted Japanese convoy and let go with two spreads of torpedoes. The 7,158-ton converted seaplane tender Sanuki Maru, exploded and quickly sank, and the frigate Kume spouted flames and began to sink slowly. Three Japanese escorts pounced on Spadefish, but she made her escape and continued her patrol.

Spadefish added to her score on 4 February by sinking the passenger-cargo ship Tairai Maru. Two days later, only five miles from Port Arthur, she blasted the 1,092-ton passenger-cargo ship Shohei Maru, to the bottom. An enemy patrol airplane dropped a depth charge in the vicinity of the submarine; but, although she was rocked by the shock waves, Spadefish was unharmed and returned to Guam on 13 February.

=== Fourth war patrol, March – April 1945 ===
On 15 March 1945, Spadefish departed Guam for her fourth war patrol, conducted in the East China Sea and Yellow Sea. On 21 March, an Allied aircraft mistakenly attacked, dropping a bomb that exploded as she submerged which exploded as she passed a depth of 45 feet (14 m). She sustained no damage or casualties, but her crew found bomb fragments on her deck after she surfaced.

On 23 March 1945, Spadefish sneaked past four escorts and let go with three torpedoes that sank the 2,274-ton cargo ship Doryo Maru. Spadefish patrolled along the coast of Kyūshū, continuing north to Tsushima Strait, where she carried out reconnaissance to determine the presence of minefields. She demolished an enemy schooner off the coast of Korea on 1 April and gave the same treatment to a three-masted junk on 7 April. Two days later, she sank the cargo ship Lee Tung; and, on 11 April, damaged a minesweeper. She terminated her fourth patrol at Guam on 21 April 1945.

=== Fifth war patrol, June – July 1945 ===
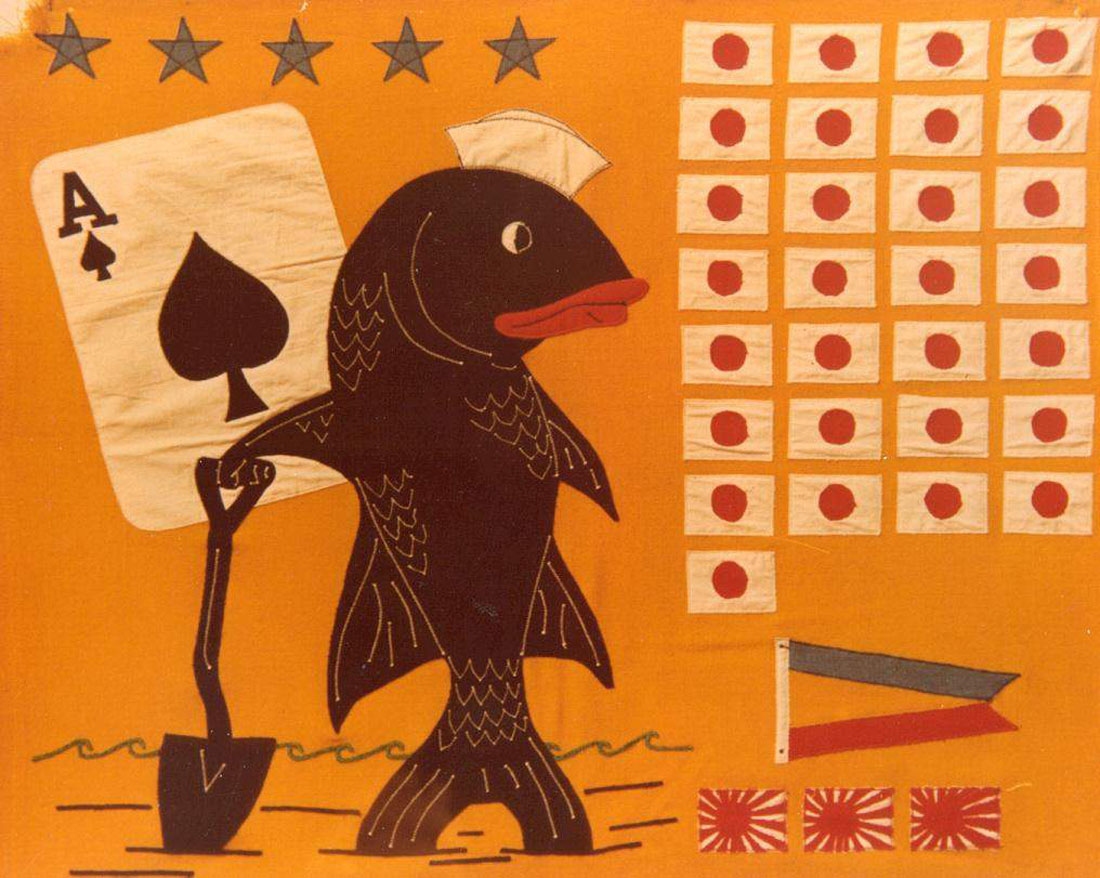
USS Spadefish's battle flag

Equipped with a new mine-detecting device, she began her fifth war patrol, joining eight other United States submarines in penetrating through the minefields of Tsushima Strait into the Sea of Japan. On 10 June, outside the breakwater of Tarukawa Wharf, Spadefish overtook the outbound passenger-cargo ship Daigen Maru No. 2, and blew the enemy ship apart with two torpedo hits. Before the day was over, the submarine had also sunk the passenger-cargo ships Unkai Maru No. 8 and Jintsu Maru.

Before dawn on 12 June 1945, Spadefish sank a motor sampan with 20 mm fire; and, later in the day, sank three trawlers in gunfire attacks. On 13 June she mistakenly sank the Soviet merchant ship SS Transbalt at 45°44′N 140°48′E in a friendly fire incident. On 14 June, she sank the passenger-cargo ship Seizan Maru; and, in a night attack on 17 June, she sank the C.M. minelayer Eijō Maru. She then rejoined the other submarines and exited the Sea of Japan, returning to Pearl Harbor on 4 July 1945.

Spadefish was preparing for another war patrol when hostilities with Japan ended on 15 August 1945 (14 August across the International Date Line in Hawaii.

=== Post-World War II ===
Spadefish remained at Pearl Harbor until 2 September 1945 and then set course for Mare Island Naval Shipyard where she was decommissioned on 3 May 1946 and placed in reserve. She was reclassified an auxiliary submarine, AGSS-411, on 6 November 1962, struck from the Navy List on 1 April 1967, towed to New London, CT Submarine Base full of spare parts and later sold for scrap in 1969.

== Honors and awards ==
Spadefish (SS-411) received four battle stars for World War II service.

== In popular culture ==
Spadefish is one of several submarines along with the era's USS Tang (SS-306), USS Bowfin (SS-287), USS Growler (SS-215), and USS Seawolf (SS-197) whose war patrols can be re-enacted in the 1985 MicroProse computer game Silent Service and the game's various ports, including Konami's 1989 release for the Nintendo Entertainment System.

In 2008 Spadefish's ship's flag and ship's wheel were appraised in Grand Rapids, Michigan, for an episode of the American television series Antiques Roadshow.

== See also ==
- Gordon Waite Underwood, commanding officer for Spadefish's first three war patrols
- List of most successful American submarines in World War II
