= Bombing of Hong Kong =

Bombing of Hong Kong may refer to:

- Japanese air raids during the Battle of Hong Kong in December 1941
- Allied attacks on the Japanese-occupied colony and shipping sailing nearby as part of the Air raids on the Hong Kong area (1942–1945)
