= Bombing of Macau (1945) =

- Part of Pacific Theater of World War II
Date	January – July 1945 (6 months)
Location	Macau
Result	See § Aftermath

Belligerents
United States	(Estado Novo (Portugal)) Portuguese Macau

Commanders and leaders
(United States) William F. Halsey (United States) John S. McCain (United States) Gerald F. Bogan	(Estado Novo (Portugal)) Gabriel Maurício Teixeira (Estado Novo (Portugal)) Álvaro Salgado

The Bombing of Macau was a series of air raids conducted by the United States against the neutral Portuguese colony of Macau during the final months of World War II. The attacks, carried out between January and July 1945, were part of broader U.S. naval operations in the South China Sea and were the only direct military attacks on the enclave during the war.

== Background ==
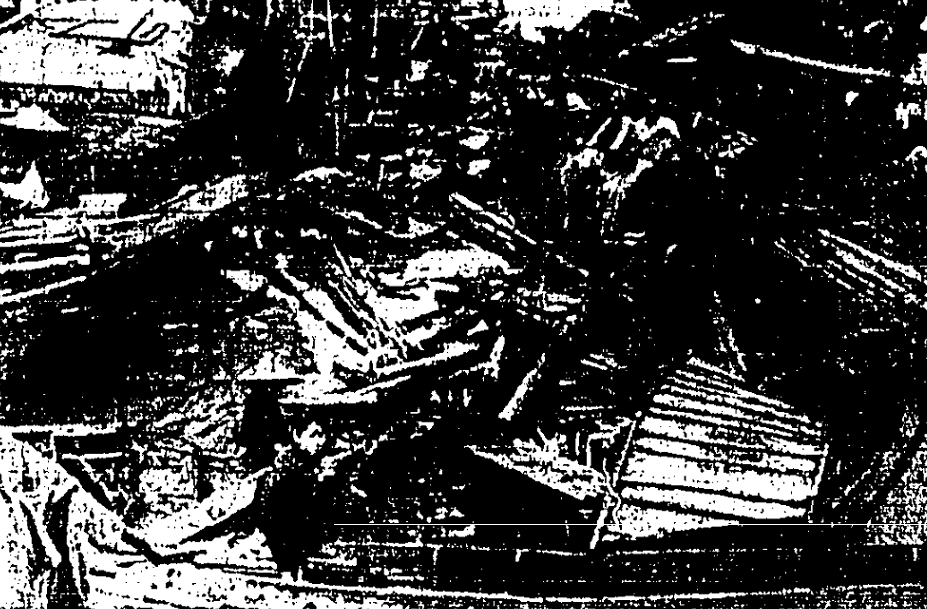
Macau in 1937

World War II, along with the Japanese invasion of China and Hong Kong, left Macau completely isolated from its neighbors and in a state of unrest. As a result, Macau became a refugee center, with its population rising from around 200,000 to 700,000 within two or three years. This influx of refugees had a significant impact on their economy, and the death rate reached 16,000–25,000 in 1942 compared to the 3,000–4,000 in 1930.

Previously, the Portuguese consul and the Japanese consul had established boundaries of Macau relating to Lapa, Dom João, and Vong Cam (Montanha). However, on 28 December 1937, the Japanese bombed Hengqin (Montanha) Island, prompting Portugal to occupy Man Lio Ho. Later, in April 1939, the Japanese bombed a Portuguese Jesuit mission at Shiuhing. Although Japan could have easily occupied Macau, it refrained from annexing it, despite taking control of Portugal's other Asian colony, East Timor, in 1942. Japanese troops were permitted to enter Macau with little resistance.

Nevertheless, the Japanese respected Macau's neutrality, while also pressuring Portuguese authorities to comply with their demands. Notably, the governor was forced to acknowledge Japanese authority in southern China and agreed to evacuate troops from Lapa, Dom João, and Montanha. Japanese ships were allowed to dock in the colony, and troops were allowed transit to Zhongshan County. In August 1943, the Japanese imposed "advisers" on the Macau government and were given the right to conduct searches within the colony.

Despite these limitations, Governor Gabriel Maurício Teixeira sought to avoid direct confrontations with the Japanese while preserving his remaining authority. Throughout the war, Macau remained an important communications source, maintaining short-wave radio cable connections to Lisbon and London.

While a Japanese invasion was constantly feared, the only direct military attacks on Macau during the war were conducted by the United States.

== Lead-up ==
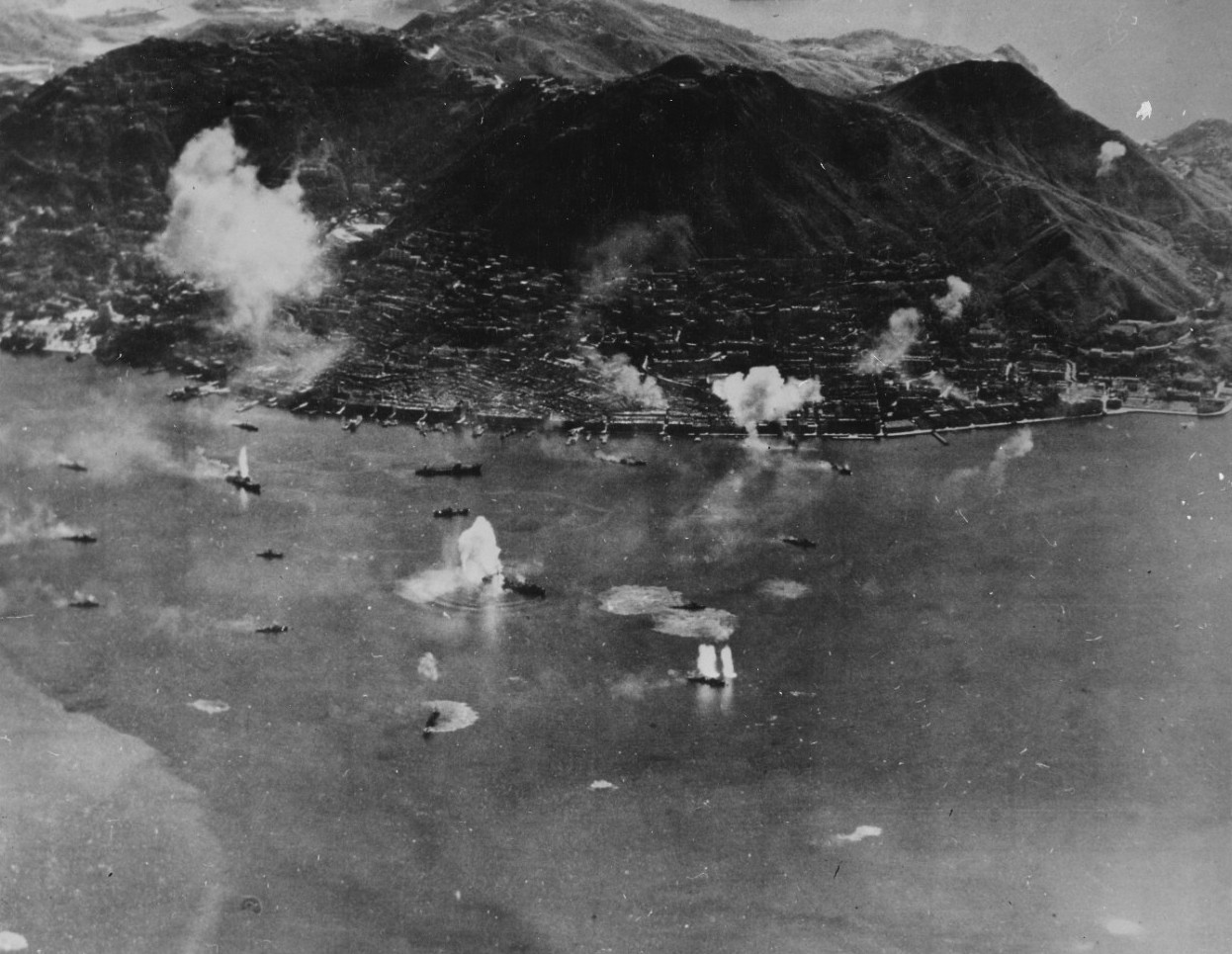
Hong Kong harbour under U.S. attack, 16 January 1945

In January 1945, an American battle fleet, Task Force 38 (TF 38), entered the South China Sea and began Operation Gratitude. Commanded by Admiral William F. Halsey, TF 38 had been ordered to seek out and destroy any warships of the Imperial Japanese Navy. The task force consisted of approximately 100 warships.

When TF 38 failed to locate Japanese warships that American military intelligence had mistakenly believed to be in Cam Ranh Bay, Fleet Admiral Chester W. Nimitz granted Halsey permission to attack other targets. On 12 January, warplanes from TF 38's carriers sank numerous Japanese merchant vessels and naval escort ships along the coasts of Vietnam. On 15 and 16 January, aircraft from TF 38 struck at Hainan, Xiamen, Taiwan, the Penghu Islands, Guangzhou and Hong Kong.

However, in a coded message by Rear Admiral Gerald F. Bogan, he stated:

"Since Macao is owned by neutral Portugal unless otherwise advised plan to brief pilots to inspect peninsular and adjacent waters for aircraft and seaplanes. No attacks to be made unless aircraft are seen and then only on aircraft and air installations".; "Brief all pilots that no attacks are to be made on Macao or shipping within two miles thereof unless Japanese aircraft or shipping are on Macao or in those waters in which case attack will be limited to those aircraft and ships".

On 16 January 1945, following an assembly on Ready Room 4, twelve Hellcats launched at 7:30 AM. The first group of five aircraft was led by George E. Kemper, while the second group of seven was led by Lloyd E. Newcomer.

=== Order of Battle ===
- U.S. Third Fleet (Admiral William F. Halsey)
  - Task Force 38 (Vice Admiral John S. McCain)
    - Task Group 38.2 (Rear Admiral Gerald F. Bogan)
      - USS Hancock (Captain Robert F. Hickey)
        - Carrier Air Group 7 (CVG-7) (Commander John D. Lamade)
          - Fighting Squadron 7 (VF-7): Operating F6F-5 Hellcats led by Lt. George E. Kemper (1st Group) and Lt. Lloyd E. Newcomer (2nd Group).

== 16 January raid ==
=== Morning attack ===
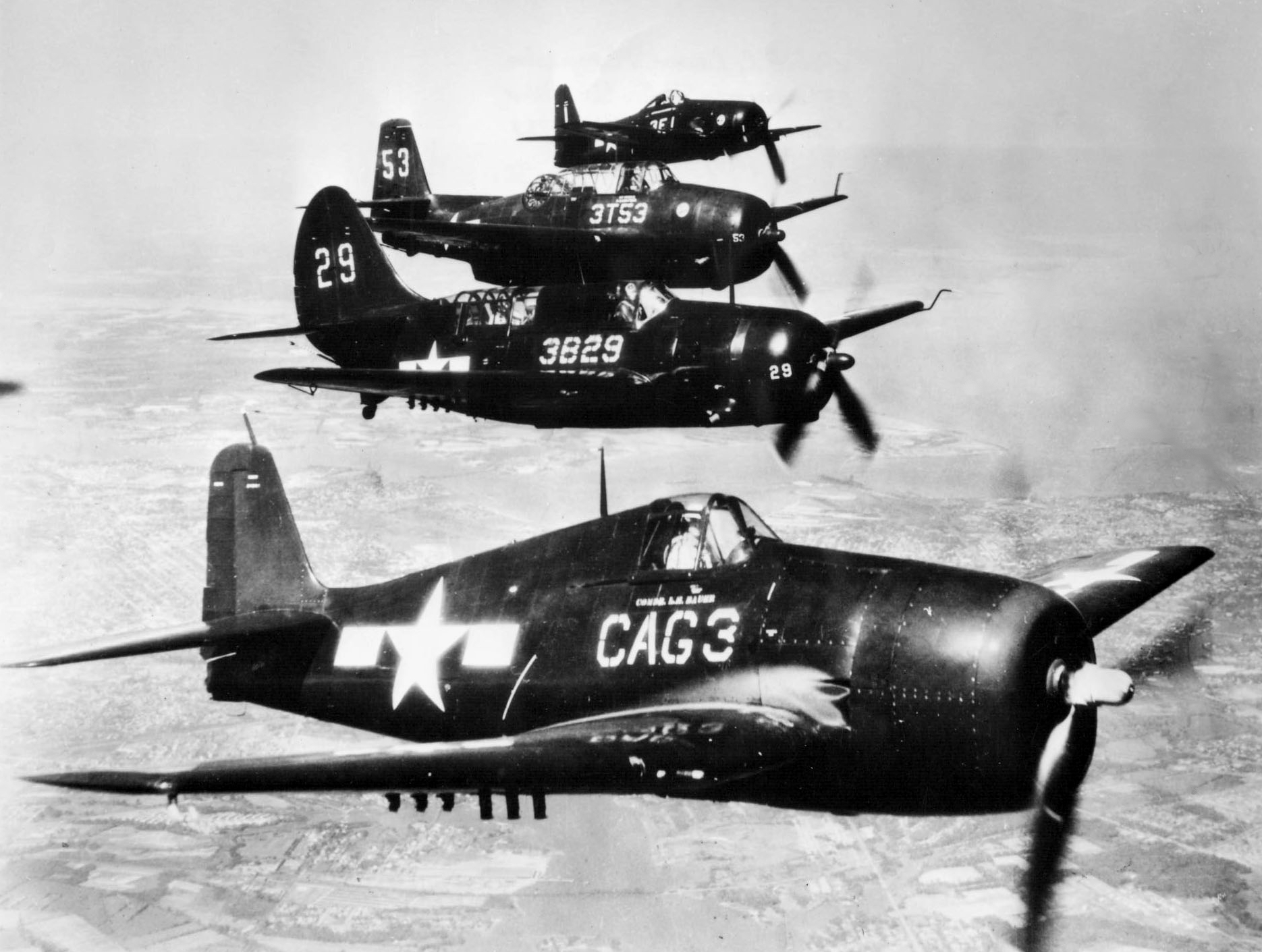
A formation of U.S. Navy Hellcats

At approximately 9:00 AM, carrier planes from the USS Enterprise operating under William Halsey Jr. attacked neutral Macau. U.S. authorities were reportedly aware of Portuguese intentions to sell part of their aircraft fuel stock to the Japanese, which prompted the operation.

The first group, led by Lt. Kemper, encountered no opposing aircraft and attacked the seaplane hangar before proceeding toward Sha Chau. Twenty minutes later, the second group arrived and set the hangar ablaze. At 9:30 AM, Lt. Kemper returned to inspect the target. He concluded that it had been destroyed and the groups of Hellcats then withdrew toward the fleet.

Leonel Barros, who was 21 years old at the time and serving in the military, notes in his book Memórias do Oriente em Guerra:

"At half past nine on January 16, 1945, on a sunny morning a few months before the end of the war, I was in a sentry next to the Porta de Armas of the São Francisco Barracks when I saw a squadron of six fighters…"

According to his account, the planes flew low over the city center, heading towards the Naval Aviation Center, where they dropped some bombs and fired machine shots. The attacked hangar stored a large amount of fuel that was to be delivered to the Japanese in exchange for rice.

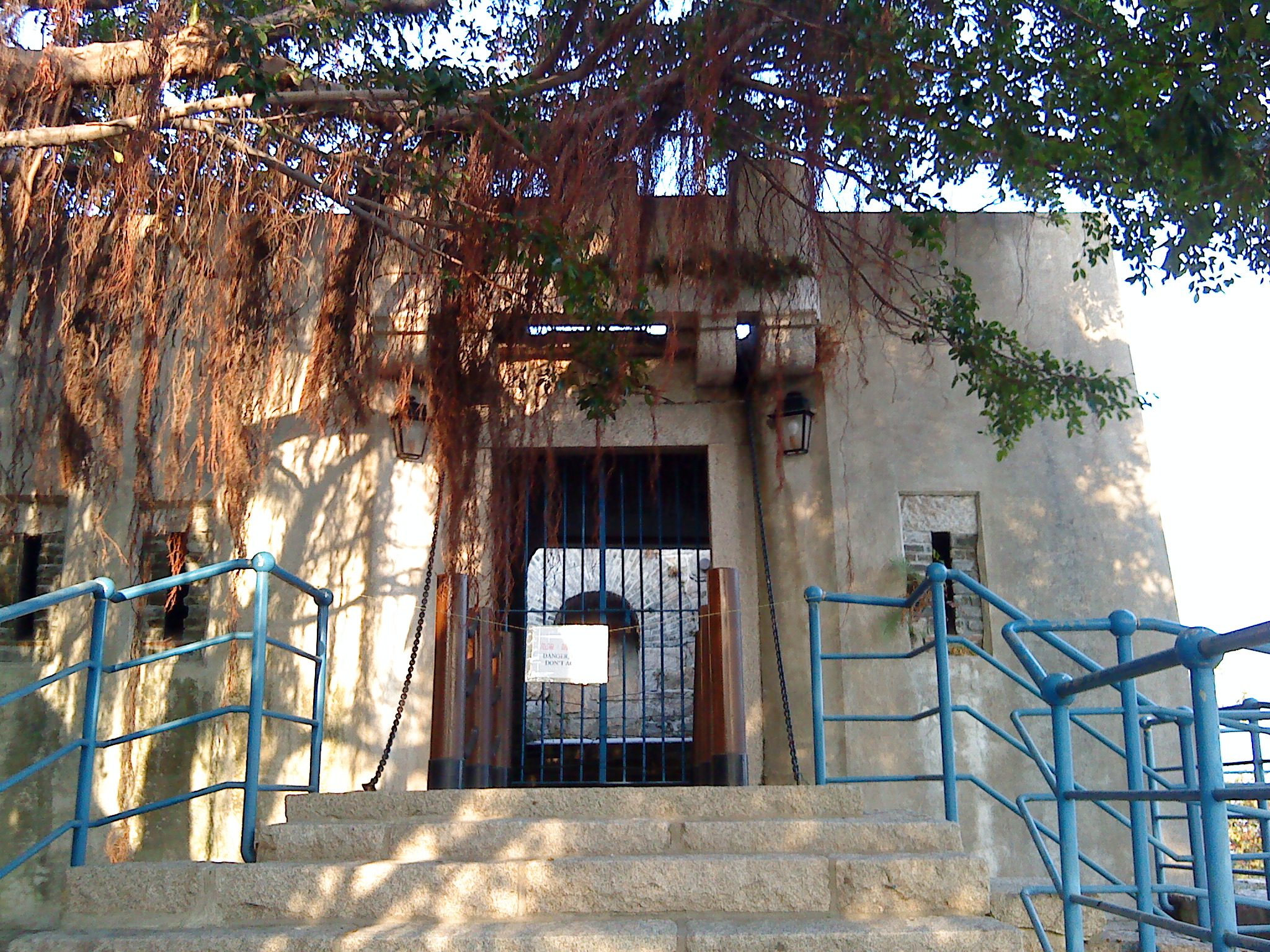
Fort Dona Maria II

The strike also hit the old prewar Pan Am hangar and a power station. The Fort Dona Maria II was bombed and sustained damage, and the former Maritime Museum of Macau, then housed in the aviation hangar, was destroyed. Casualties range from five deaths to two soldiers and several civilians killed.

During the raid, Commander Álvaro Salgado mobilized personnel to the sandbag fortifications. Two of the aircraft attacked the military barracks, damaging windows and plumbing and causing injuries among the stationed soldiers. The morning attack ended around 11:45 AM.

=== Afternoon attack ===
Later between 3:00 and 3:30 PM, four aircraft under Lt. E. W. Niebling returned over Macau. Pedro José Lobo and his son Rogerio, who were surveying the damage to the hangar, heard approaching aircraft and took cover as Niebling and his wingman opened fire. Heavy machine-gun rounds riddled the hangar but both survived without injuries.

=== Consequences ===
The raid shocked the locals of Macau and drew protests from the Portuguese government, which denounced it as a violation of Portugal's neutrality. On 20 January, Washington issued an apology for what it described as an "error" and offered financial compensation. Although Lisbon accepted the apology, resentment persisted as the Inner Harbour was subjected to subsequent bombing raids.

== 25 February raid ==
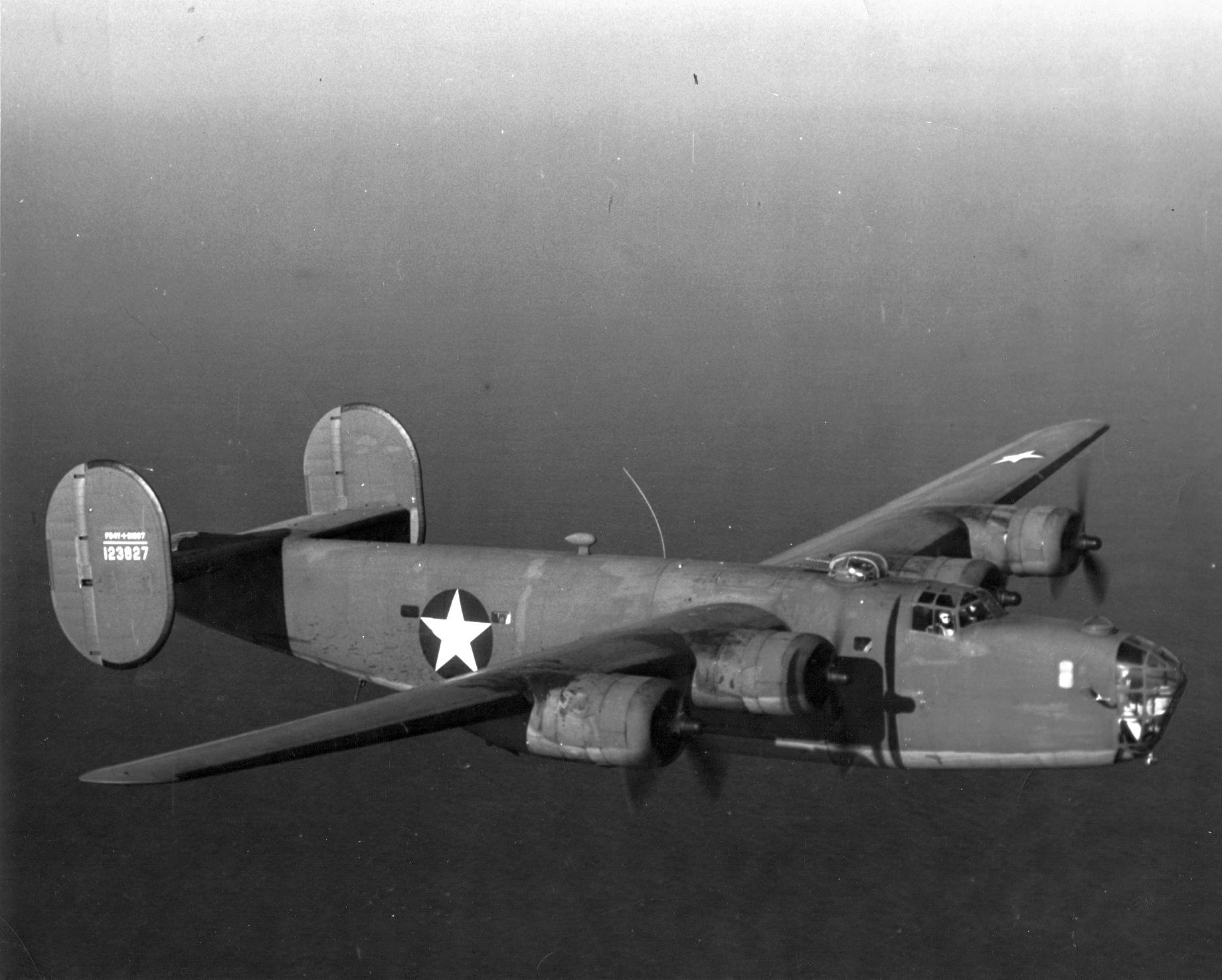
A U.S. Navy Consolidated PB4Y-1

On 25 February, a PB4Y-1 commanded by Lieutenant Stevens carried out a second raid, this time targeting a Japanese steamer and aircraft. According to Consul John Pownall Reeves, it narrowly missed crowded refugee quarters. Instead it damaged a Catholic school and struck the vessel Masbate. The attack caused four additional deaths and several injuries. In the Lisbon newspaper Diário da Manhã, António de Oliveira Salazar lamented the event and stated that neutrality would remain despite the presence of Japanese forces adjacent to Macau.

The Portuguese government claimed 200,000 patacas for compensation of damages to the Fátima Mission and the Tamagnini Barbosa neighborhood. Other private claims were filed by the owners of the SS Masbate and Trygve Jorgensen, a Norwegian commander of a small Allied steamer. The attack injured Jorgensen, killed his dog and cook, and dented his ship. Although Jorgensen claimed 25,000 patacas for his injuries, he was awarded only 19,650 patacas.

== Later raids ==
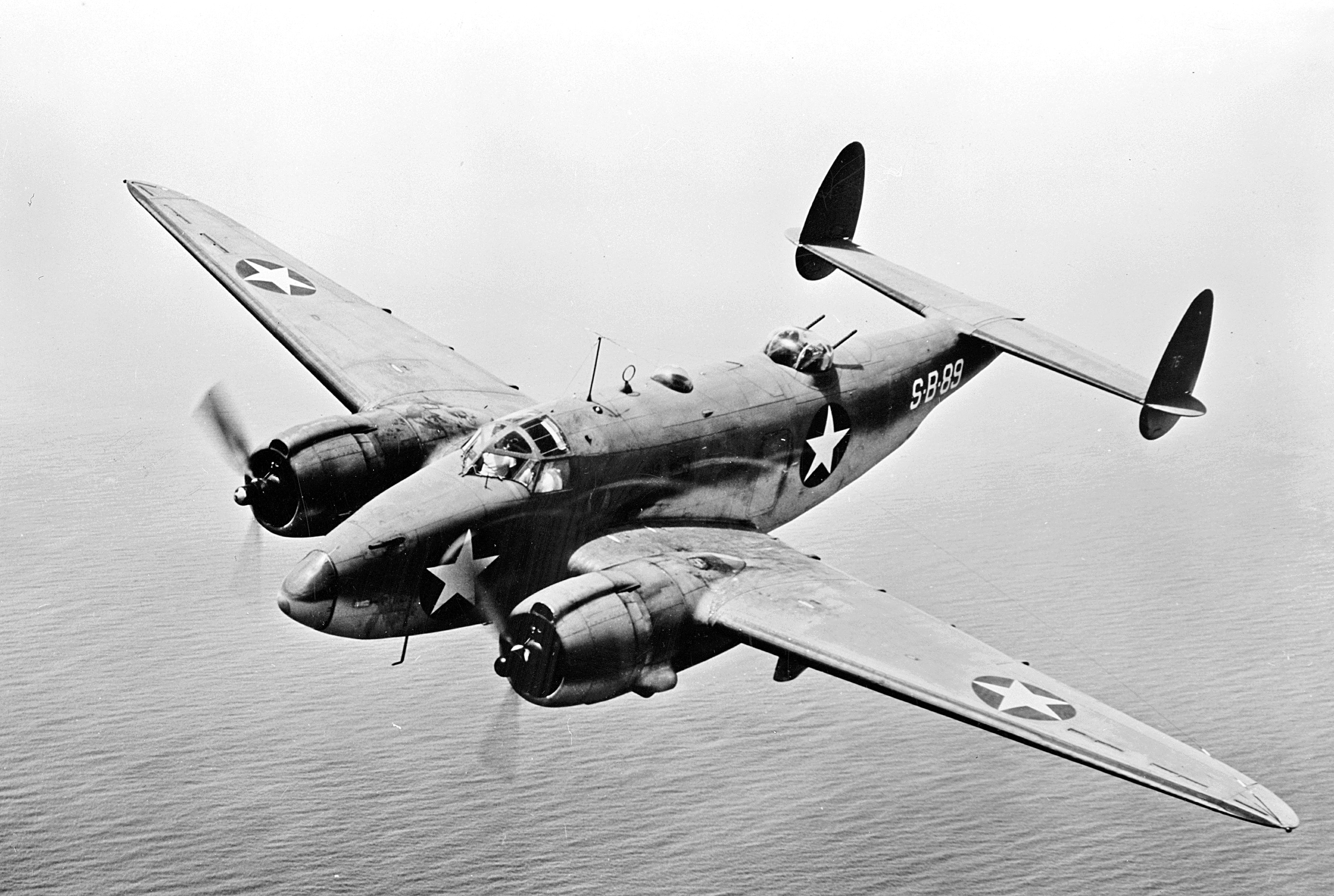
A Lockheed PV-1 Ventura

On 7 or 12 April, a PV-1 Ventura sank the speedboat Fei-Cheong, owned by the I-Cheong-Hong Company of Canton, in the Outer Port of Macau, killing 15–19 people. However, no Portuguese compensation claim was filed.

On 11 June, a B-29 dropped 3 bombs on Bairro 28 de Maio, causing one death and several injuries. On 5 or 26 July, the island of Coloane was bombed, but it resulted in no casualties or significant damage.

== Aftermath ==
=== Reactions ===
The immediate response to the bombing of Macau in Lisbon was intense, with major newspapers denouncing the attack as a severe violation of Portugal's strict neutrality. Among these were the 17 January 1945 editions of Diário de Lisboa, Comércio do Porto, and Diário Popular.

The Japanese Dōmei Tsushin reported on the bombing through its affiliated Hongkong News (19 January 1945), with the headline: "Neutral Macao relentlessly bombed by the U.S. air force; Heavy property loss and civilian casualties".

French diplomatic reports described Portugal as a nation that "rigorously upheld its neutrality" and welcomed "all refugees, men, women, and children seeking shelter." By attacking Portugal, the assailant was seen as committing an act of "ingratitude toward its benefactor".

However, some accounts justify the bombings as a necessary action against the Portuguese Macanese authorities' "pro-Japanese neutrality".

=== End of the war ===
The end of the war was widely celebrated in Macau, but the Portuguese enclave faced the challenges of rebuilding its postwar economy and securing its political future. Throughout the conflict, the new wave of refugees from Hong Kong only intensified a social crisis that had persisted since 1937, causing food shortages and increased hunger and mortality. Nevertheless, as compensation for the air strikes, the United States government paid Portugal 1,043,714.35 patacas (US$20,255,952) in 1950.

Governor Gabriel Maurício Teixeira stated that the fact that Macau managed to survive the war "depends more on the spiritual than on the material"; "Let's not forget the lesson received and let's not repeat the mistakes that led the world to the catastrophe of war".

== See also ==
- History of Macau
- Military of Portuguese Macau
- Portugal during World War II

== Bibliography ==
- Reeves, John Pownall (2014). Day, Colin; Garett, Richard (eds.). The Lone Flag. Hong Kong University. ISBN 9789888208326.
- Gunn, Geoffrey C. (2016). "Epilogue". In Geoffrey C. Gunn (ed.). Wartime Macau: Under the Japanese Shadow (1 ed.). Hong Kong University Press. ISBN 978-9888390519.
- Garrett, Richard J. (2010). The Defences of Macau: Forts, Ships and Weapons over 450 Years. Hong Kong: Hong Kong University Press. ISBN 978-9888028498.
- Bailey, Steven K. (2018). "Briefing Failure in Ready Room 4: The Question of Culpability for U.S. Navy Air Strikes on Macau, 16 January 1945". Journal of the Royal Asiatic Society Hong Kong Branch. 58: 30–54.
- Lopes, Helena F. S. (15 June 2023). Cambridge University Press (ed.). Neutrality and Collaboration in South China. ISBN 9781009311779.
