= Japanese minesweeper Otowa Maru =

History

Empire of Japan
- Name: Otowa Maru
- Builder: Osaka Tekkosho Sakurajima Kojo
- Launched: March 1934
- Sponsored by: Nippon Suisan K.K.
- Acquired: requisitioned by Imperial Japanese Navy, 15 September 1940
- Stricken: 3 May 1947
- Homeport: Tobata
- Identification: 27092
- Fate: Sunk by aircraft, 12 January 1945
- Notes: Call sign: JIJA

General characteristics
- Class & type: trawler
- Tonnage: 220 GRT
- Length: 35.9 m (117 ft 9 in) o/a
- Beam: 6.8 m (22 ft 4 in)
- Draught: 3.8 m (12 ft 6 in)
- Armament: 1 x 8 cm/40 3rd Year Type naval gun; 8 depth charges; minesweeping equipment

Otowa Maru (Japanese: 音羽丸) was a Japanese fishing trawler that was requisitioned by the Imperial Japanese Navy during World War II and converted into an auxiliary minesweeper.

== History ==
She was laid down at the shipyard of Osaka Tekkosho Sakurajima Kojo for the benefit of Nippon Suisan K.K. and launched in March 1920. In 1921, her port of registry was changed from Hiroshima to Shimonoseki; and in 1930, to Tobata. She worked as a fishing vessel until 15 September 1940 when she was requisitioned by the Imperial Japanese Navy. Her conversion to an auxiliary minesweeper was started on 25 September 1940 at the Mako Naval Base and completed on 15 November 1940. She was assigned to the Sasebo Guard Force until 1 September 1941 when she was assigned to the Southern Expeditionary Fleet organized to invade and occupy French Indochina with Reserve Lieutenant Nagahashi Kimata (長橋喜間太) as her commanding officer. She spent most of her time on patrol, conducting anti-submarine and escort duty between the ports of Sai Kung, Hong Kong, and Cam Ranh Bay.

On 12 January 1945, off Cam Ranh Bay in the South China Sea (11°50′N 109°00′E), she was attacked and sunk by aircraft from Vice Admiral John S. McCain, Sr.'s Task Force 38 that had entered the South China Sea to raid Japanese shipping. Otowa Maru was struck from the Navy List on 3 May 1947.
