= South China Sea raid =

World War II raid by the US

- Part of Pacific Theater of World War II
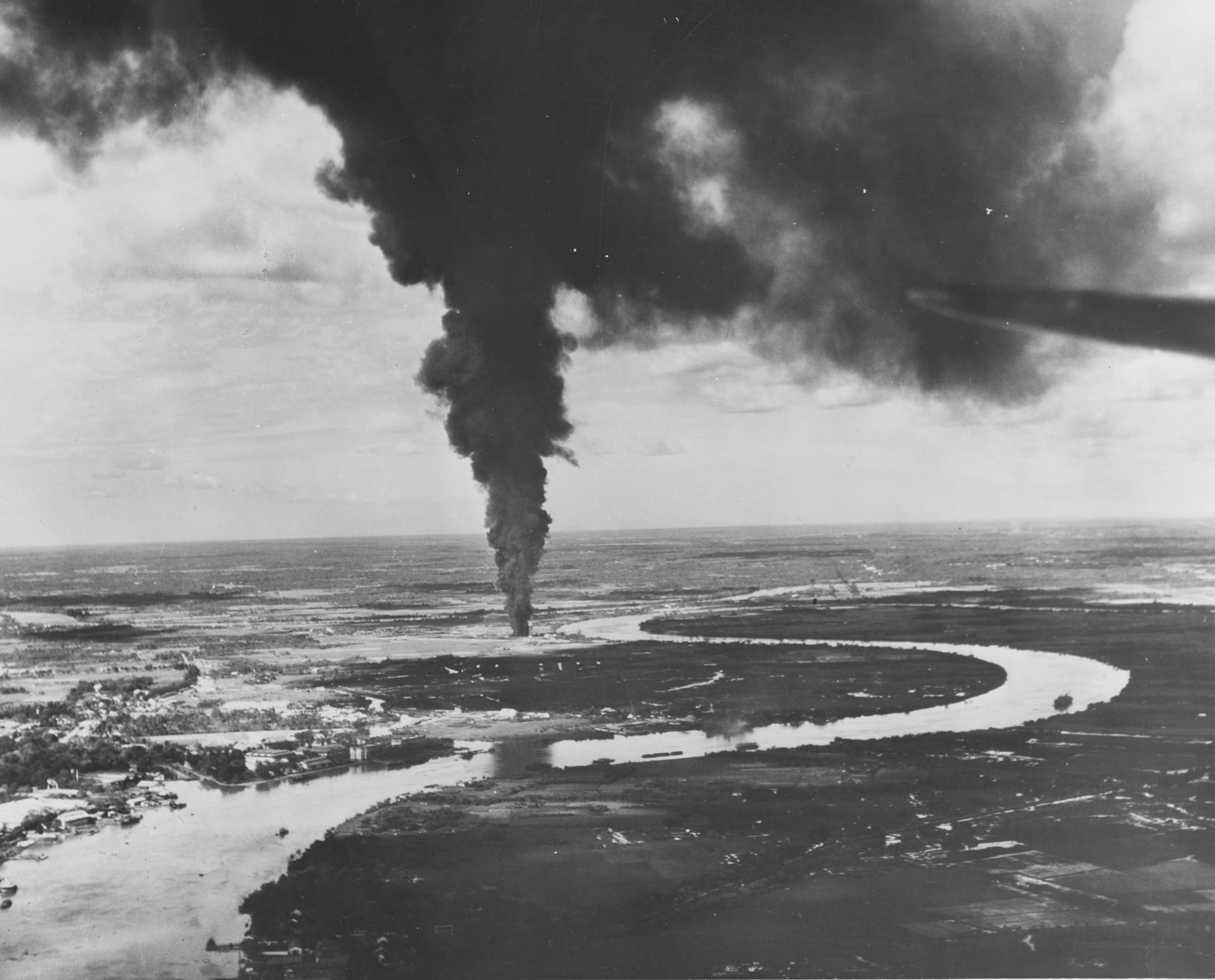
- Smoke rising from Saigon after facilities and ships in the city were attacked by United States Navy aircraft on 12 January 1945
Date	10–20 January 1945
Location	South China Sea
Status	American victory

Belligerents
United States	Japan

Commanders and leaders
William Halsey Jr. John S. McCain Sr.	Hisaichi Terauchi

Casualties and losses
Aircraft losses between 3 and 25 January: 98 aircraft, 136 aircrew (combat); 103 aircraft, 31 aircrew (operational)	Losses between 3 and 25 January: 300,000 tons of shipping; 615 aircraft
- Hundreds of civilians killed and wounded

The South China Sea raid (designated Operation Gratitude) was an operation conducted by the United States Third Fleet between 10 and 20 January 1945 during the Pacific War of World War II. The raid was undertaken to support the liberation of Luzon in the Philippines, and targeted Japanese warships, supply convoys and aircraft in the region.

After attacking airfields and shipping at Formosa and Luzon, the Third Fleet entered the South China Sea during the night of 9–10 January. Aircraft flying from its aircraft carriers attacked Japanese shipping off French Indochina on 12 January, sinking 44 vessels. The fleet then sailed north and attacked Formosa again on 15 January. Further raids were conducted against Hong Kong, Canton, Hainan and Macau the next day. The Third Fleet departed the South China Sea on 20 January and, after making further attacks on Formosa and the Ryukyu Islands, returned to its base on 25 January.

The Third Fleet's operations in the South China Sea were highly successful. It destroyed many Japanese ships and aircraft, while losing relatively few of its own aircraft. Historians have judged the destruction of cargo vessels and oil tankers to have been the most important result of the raid, as these losses contributed to closing a supply route which was vital to the Japanese war effort. Subsequent attacks by Allied aircraft and warships forced the Japanese to cease sending ships into the South China Sea after March 1945.

== Background ==
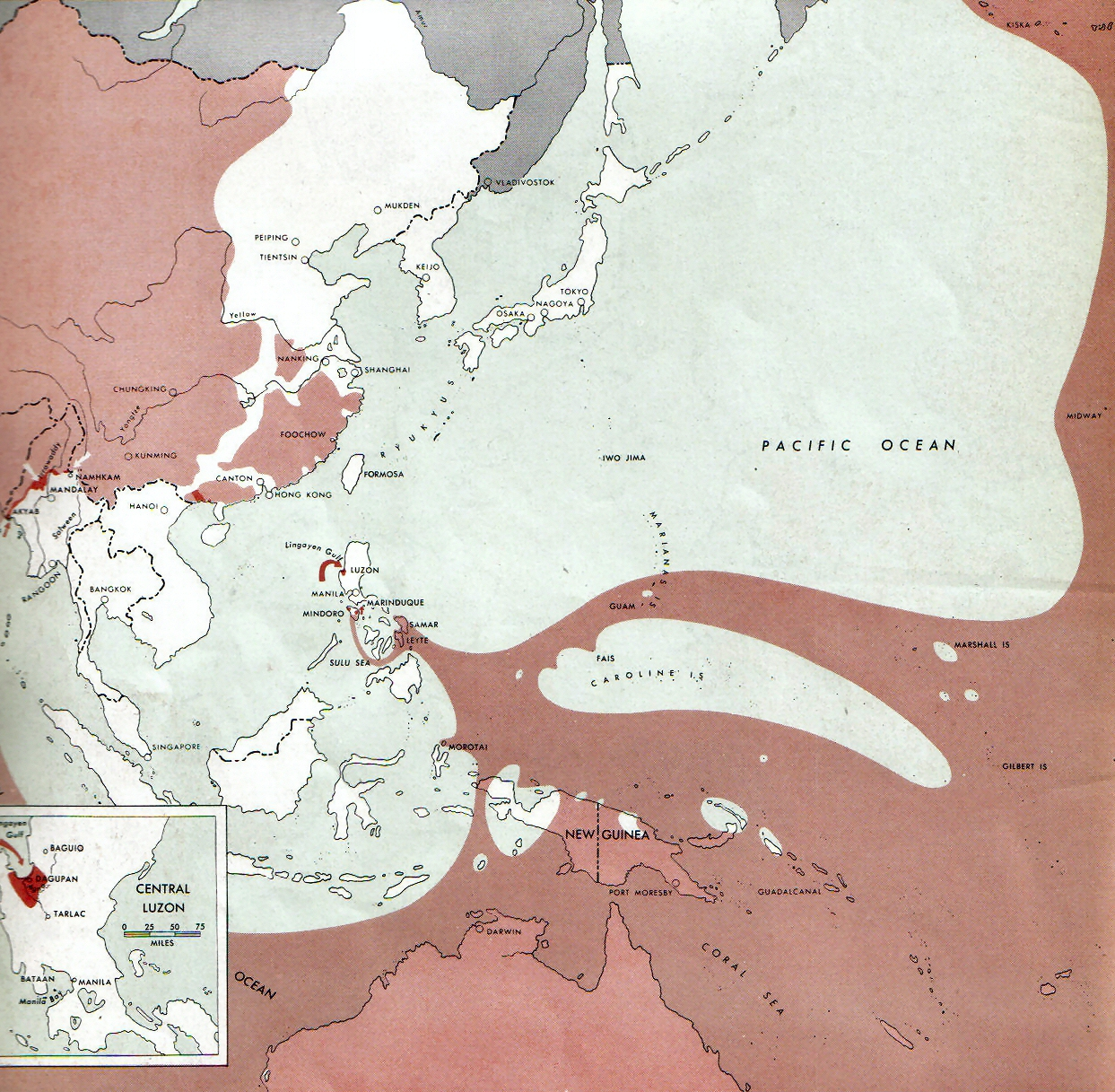
The strategic situation in the Pacific in January 1945. The red shaded area was controlled by the Allies and the remainder was controlled by Japan.

During 1941 and the first months of 1942, Japan conquered or established de facto rule over almost the entire South China Sea region. Control of the sea was vital to the Japanese economy and war effort, as it was the conduit through which essential supplies of oil and other natural resources passed from occupied Malaya, Borneo and the Dutch East Indies. The situation in French Indochina was particularly complex. After a short military confrontation in September 1940 the colonial government, which was loyal to the Vichy French collaborationist regime, permitted the Japanese to use ports and airfields in northern Indochina. In July 1941 the Japanese occupied southern Indochina and established airfields as well as an important naval base at Cam Ranh Bay. The French authorities remained in place as a puppet government. After the liberation of France in 1944, the colonial government sought to make contact with the new Free French government in Paris, and began preparations to stage an uprising against the Japanese. The Japanese also developed plans in 1944 to forcibly disarm the French forces and formally take over Indochina, and their intelligence services rapidly learned of the French authorities' intentions.

As the war turned against Japan, convoys of ships passing through the South China Sea frequently came under attack from Allied submarines and – by late 1944 – aircraft. These attacks were guided by information gained from signals intelligence and long-range air patrols, supplemented by reports from coast watchers along the Chinese coast and other observers in Asian ports. The United States Army Air Forces' (USAAF) Fourteenth Air Force, which was stationed in China, regularly attacked Japanese shipping in the South China Sea area. The command also made periodic attacks on Japanese-held ports in southern China and military installations in Indochina. The Allied clandestine services undertook few activities in Indochina until the second quarter of 1945.

While losses of oil tankers and freighters were increasingly heavy, the Japanese Government continued to order ships to make the voyage through the South China Sea. In an attempt to limit losses, convoys and individual ships took routes well away from the established sea lanes, or sailed close to the shore and operated only at night.

The United States began the liberation of the Philippines on 25 October 1944, with a landing at Leyte island in the central Philippines. After a base was established at Leyte, American forces landed at Mindoro island on 13 December. This operation was conducted to secure airfields that could be used to attack Japanese shipping in the South China Sea and support the largest element of the liberation of the Philippines, a landing at Lingayen Gulf in north-western Luzon that was scheduled for 9 January 1945. The Imperial Japanese Navy (IJN) suffered heavy losses in its attempt to attack the Allied fleet during the Battle of Leyte Gulf in October 1944 which, when combined with the losses during the Battle of the Philippine Sea in June 1944, left it unable to conduct further major battles. However, it remained capable of raiding Allied positions.

During late 1944 Admiral William Halsey Jr., the commander of the United States Third Fleet, sought to conduct a raid into the South China Sea and led the development of plans for such an operation. On 21 November he asked Admiral Chester W. Nimitz, the head of the United States Pacific Fleet, for permission to begin the attack but was turned down.

== Preparations ==
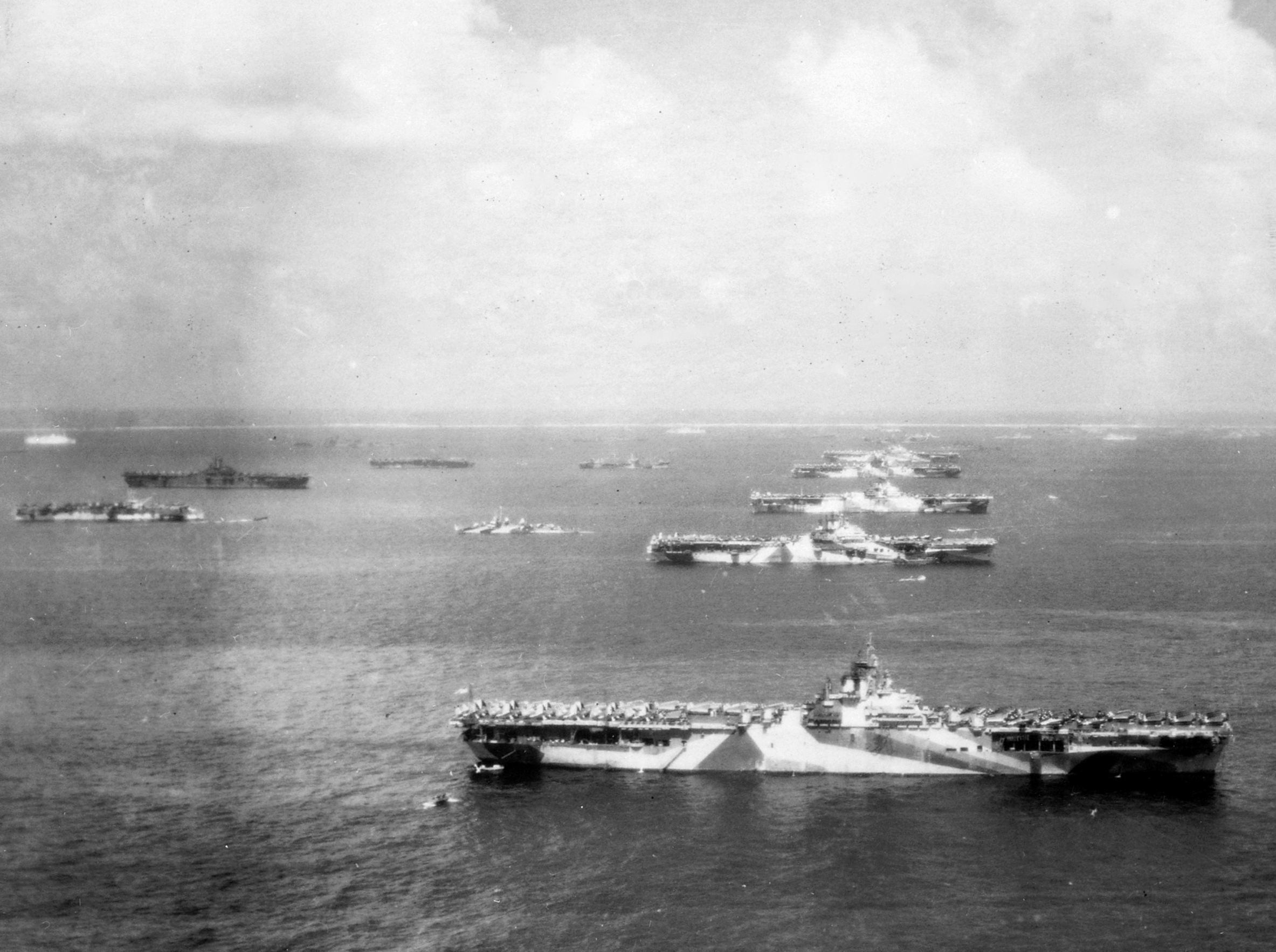
Several of the Third Fleet's aircraft carriers and other warships at Ulithi in early December 1944

In December 1944 the United States Navy's high command became concerned that the IJN would attempt to cut the supply line to the planned beachhead at Lingayen Gulf. On 26 December a Japanese naval force operating from Cam Ranh Bay shelled the Allied beachhead at Mindoro, but inflicted no damage. One of the Japanese destroyers involved in this operation was sunk, and all of the remaining ships were damaged by Allied air and naval attacks before returning to Cam Ranh Bay.

As further Japanese raids were expected, senior US Navy officers believed that it was necessary to destroy the IJN's remaining mobile forces, which were thought to be split between Cam Ranh Bay and the Inland Sea in Japan. At this time the Inland Sea was beyond the range of the USAAF's heavy bombers, meaning that an attack into the South China Sea was the only viable option for striking the IJN. The US Navy's intelligence service believed that the Japanese force based at Cam Ranh Bay was built around the two Ise-class battleships. Halsey and Nimitz discussed the proposed South China Sea raid during a meeting held around Christmas 1944 at the US Navy anchorage which had been established at Ulithi atoll in the Caroline Islands. On 28 December Nimitz gave Halsey permission to launch the attack once his fleet was no longer needed to directly support the Lingayen Gulf landings and "if major Japanese fleet units were sighted" in the area. Halsey issued the pre-prepared plans for the operation to his subordinates the same day. Its goals were to attack the Japanese fleet and shipping. In addition, the Americans believed that the presence of a powerful force in the South China Sea would discourage any further IJN operations in the area. While the Fourteenth Air Force was directed to attack Japanese shipping and airfields at Hong Kong in support of the invasion of Luzon, it was not informed of the plans for the Third Fleet to enter the South China Sea. The Fourteenth Air Force was also not briefed on the Fleet's operations during the South China Sea raid, and no attempts were made to coordinate the two forces' activities during this period.

The plans for the raid specified that the Third Fleet would enter the South China Sea via the Luzon Strait before proceeding south-west. The fleet's aircraft carriers would attack Japanese positions on Formosa, and provide support for the landings at Lingayen Gulf on 9 January. Three submarines from the Seventh Fleet were to take up station in the South China Sea to rescue the aircrew of any American aircraft which were forced to ditch. This plan would require the Third Fleet to operate near many Japanese airfields from which attacks could be mounted against the ships. Allied intelligence estimated that about 300 aircraft were usually stationed at Formosa; around 500 were in southern China and northern Indochina, a further 170 in southern Indochina, Burma and Thailand and 280 in the Dutch East Indies. While most of these were Imperial Japanese Army Air Force (IJAAF) aircraft, which were less effective against warships than IJN aircraft, there was a risk that kamikaze tactics would be employed. In addition, weather conditions were expected to be hazardous as the South China Sea is frequently affected by typhoons during January.

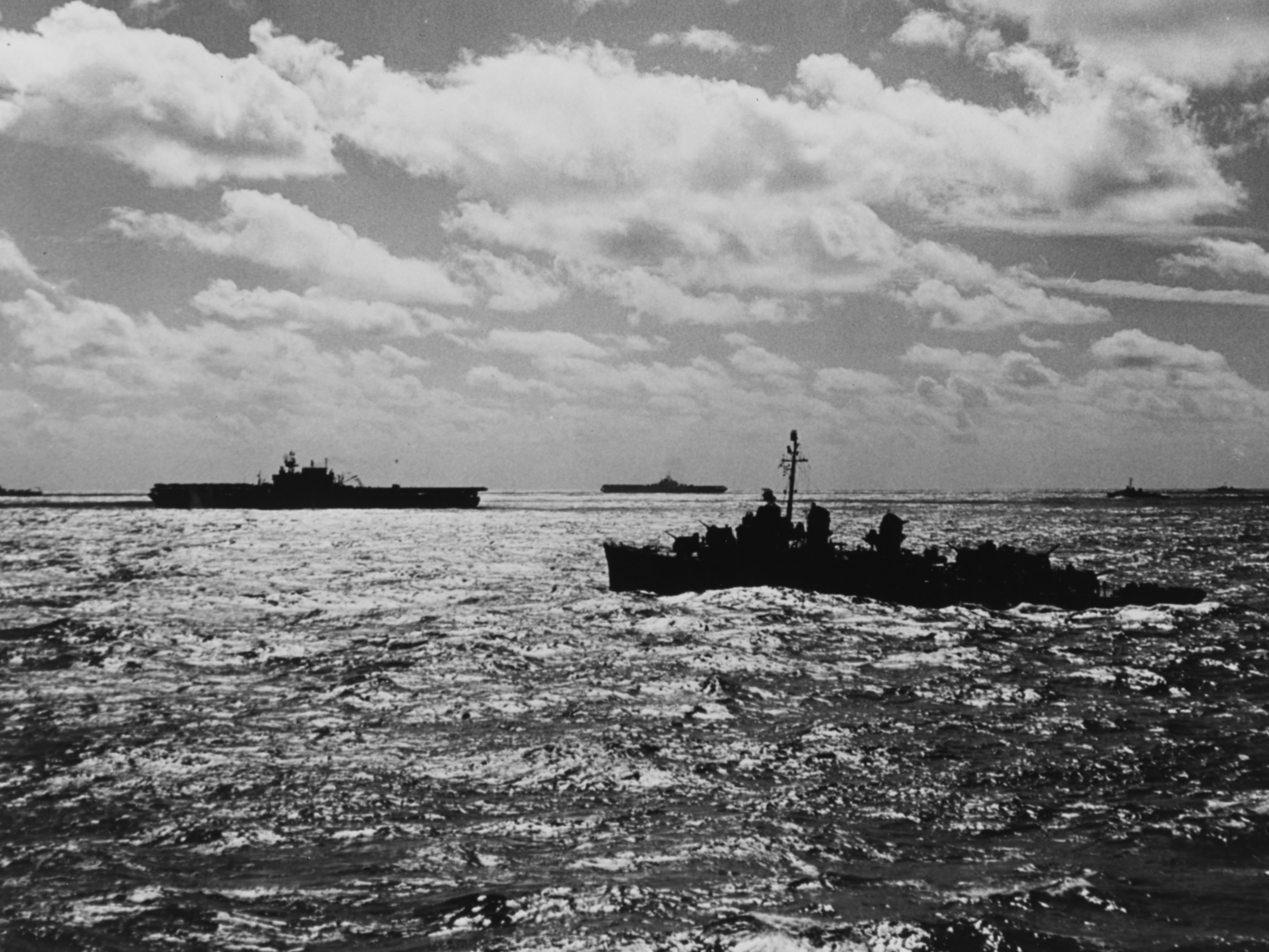
Ships of the Third Fleet en route to the Philippines in January 1945

As of January 1945, the Third Fleet was built around the Fast Carrier Task Force, which was the main US Navy strike force in the Pacific. Control of this force alternated at regular intervals between the Third and Fifth Fleets (commanded by Halsey and Admiral Raymond A. Spruance respectively), with its designation also changing from Task Force 38 to Task Force 58. As Task Force 38 it was commanded by Vice Admiral John S. McCain Sr. In January 1945 Task Force 38 was organized into three fast carrier task groups and a night carrier group. The fast carrier groups were Task Group 38.1 with four aircraft carriers, two battleships, six cruisers and 25 destroyers; Task Group 38.2 with four carriers, three battleships, five cruisers and 24 destroyers; and Task Group 38.3, which comprised four carriers, three battleships, five cruisers and 17 destroyers. The night carrier group, Task Group 38.5, had two carriers and six destroyers, and operated with Task Group 38.2 during the day. These carrier groups embarked around 900 aircraft in total. The other major element of the fleet was a logistics force designated Task Group 30.8, which comprised a varying number of tankers and ammunition ships, several escort carriers transporting replacement aircraft for Task Force 38, and many escorting destroyers. In addition, the fleet was assigned an anti-submarine hunter-killer force designated Task Group 30.7, which comprised an escort carrier and three destroyer escorts and typically operated in support of Task Group 30.8.

Despite the American concerns, the IJN was not about to attack the Allied supply lines and Cam Ranh Bay was not a major fleet base. As of 1 January 1945, both the Ise-class battleships and the small number of other Japanese warships in the region were stationed at or near Singapore, and only escort vessels operated from Cam Ranh Bay. While large numbers of aircraft were located in Japanese-held territories bordering the South China Sea in January 1945, relatively few trained pilots were available to operate them. At this time the Imperial General Headquarters was considering a major offensive against the supply line to Lingayen Gulf, but on 20 January 1945 it decided to concentrate Japan's defensive efforts on the area around the home islands and only conduct delaying actions elsewhere. As a result, the Japanese forces in the South China Sea region at the time of the raid were focused on preparing to resist future Allied attacks. The Japanese believed that US forces could potentially land in Indochina once the liberation of the Philippines was complete, and were also concerned about possible attacks on the area by the British-led South East Asia Command. In an effort to better coordinate the Japanese forces in the South East Asia region, all Imperial Japanese Army and Navy units were placed under the overall control of the Southern Expeditionary Army Group in January 1945. This command was led by Gensui Count Hisaichi Terauchi from his headquarters in Singapore.

Despite these preparations, the Japanese remained unable to counter powerful attacks against shipping in the South China Sea. While the Navy's convoy escort forces had been expanded during 1944, they remained inadequate. The most common type of escort vessel, the Kaibōkan, was vulnerable to air attack as a result of their slow speed and weak anti-aircraft armament. The IJN also assigned few fighter aircraft to protect convoys in the South China Sea and, due to the interservice rivalry which badly hindered the Japanese war effort, rejected an offer from the Army to provide additional fighters for this purpose just before the Third Fleet's attacks on French Indochina.

== Attack ==
=== Entry into the South China Sea ===
Map tracing USS Essex's movements with the Fast Carrier Task Force during Operation Gratitude, including sortie launch points and refueling sites marked A to U

The Third Fleet sailed from Ulithi on 30 December 1944. On 3 and 4 January its aircraft carriers struck Japanese airfields on Formosa, Okinawa and nearby islands in an attempt to prevent them from being used to attack the Allied forces at Lingayen Gulf. In addition, its strike aircraft attacked Japanese shipping at Formosa, sinking at least three merchant vessels and damaging four frigates. Acting on a request from General Douglas MacArthur, the commander of the South West Pacific Area, the fleet struck airfields on Luzon on 6 and 7 January. At around this time Vice-Admiral Thomas C. Kinkaid, the commander of the Seventh Fleet which was responsible for the Lingayen Gulf landings, asked Halsey to operate west of Luzon to provide air cover during the initial period of the invasion. Halsey believed it would be inappropriate for his force to operate in such a passive role, and instead ordered further strikes on the Japanese airfields in southern Formosa which posed the greatest threat to Kinkaid's command. These took place on 9 January. During the morning of 9 January, Nimitz released the Third Fleet from directly covering the Lingayen Gulf area, and authorized it to enter the South China Sea. Once all the strike aircraft had landed that afternoon Halsey issued orders to execute the planned attack into the South China Sea. During the fleet's operations from 3 to 9 January it destroyed more than 150 Japanese aircraft, but lost 86 of its own, including 46 in accidents.

During the night of 9–10 January the main body of the Third Fleet, including Task Group 30.7, sailed through the Bashi Channel in the northern part of the Luzon Strait. Task Group 30.8 was reduced to six fast tankers, two escort carriers and escorting warships, and reached the South China Sea via the Balintang Channel off the northern coast of Luzon. Neither force was detected by the Japanese, though night fighters operating from the light aircraft carrier USS Independence shot down three transport aircraft that were flying to Formosa from Luzon. The fleet also received a report that a large Japanese convoy of around 100 ships was sailing along the southern coast of China towards Formosa during the night of 9–10 January, but Halsey decided to not attack it as doing so would disclose that his force was in the South China Sea and possibly prompt the IJN to withdraw its battleships from the area.

While it was planned to refuel the fleet's destroyers on 10 January, this was frustrated by bad weather. Instead, the destroyers were refueled during 11 January as the fleet proceeded south-west. Once the destroyers were refueled, the Third Fleet was reorganized for combat. Two heavy cruisers and five destroyers were transferred from Task Group 38.1 to Task Group 38.2. The latter task group, under the command of Rear Admiral Gerald F. Bogan, was intended to launch air attacks against Cam Ranh Bay from its three large fleet carriers and single light carrier on the morning of 12 January. The Task Group's two battleships, accompanied by destroyers and cruisers, would then bombard the area and finish off ships which were damaged in the air attacks. The choice of targets was informed by intelligence passed on to the Allies by two networks of agents in Indochina. The Third Fleet remained undetected by Japanese forces on 10 and 11 January.

=== Strikes on southern Indochina ===
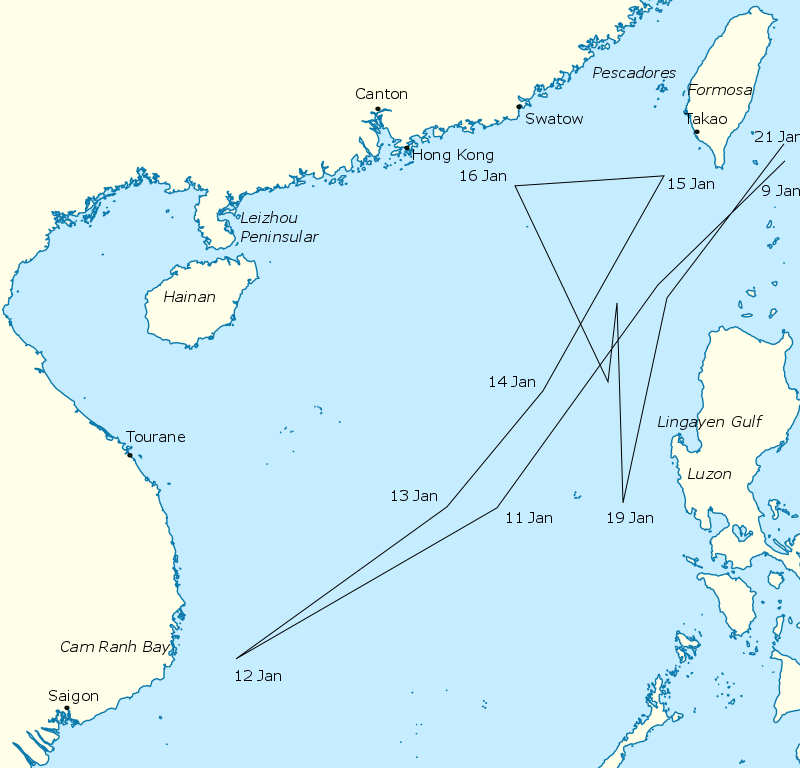
The Third Fleet's approximate route between 9 and 21 January 1945

Task Group 38.2 began its approach to Cam Ranh Bay at 2 pm on 11 January. It was followed by Task Groups 38.1 and 38.3, which launched fighter aircraft to provide a combat air patrol over the fleet. Task Group 30.8 remained in the central South China Sea. Before dawn on 12 January, Task Group 38.5 launched aircraft to search for Japanese ships in the Cam Ranh Bay area. The crews of these aircraft radioed back the location of Japanese ships, and conducted an intensive search for the two Ise-class battleships and any other capital ships. When none were located it was believed that the warships had been hidden from view by camouflage; it took several months for the US Navy to learn that they had not been in the area. By 6 am on 12 January Task Group 38.2 was within 50 miles (80 km) of Cam Ranh Bay. It and the other two task groups began launching their first strikes of the day at 07:31 am, about half an hour before sunrise. The Japanese had still not detected the Third Fleet's approach, and were unprepared for an attack. The American airmen achieved considerable success against Japanese convoys. Two waves of aircraft from Task Group 38.3 attacked a convoy of 10 ships escorted by the seven warships of the 101st Flotilla near Qui Nhơn in central Indochina and sank four fully loaded oil tankers, three freighters, the light cruiser Kashii and three small escort vessels. Another convoy was located and struck near Cape Padaran in southern Indochina, resulting in the loss of a tanker, two destroyer escorts and a patrol boat. A convoy comprising seven vessels was also attacked near Cape St. Jacques in southern Indochina, leading to two freighters, three tankers, three destroyer escorts and a landing craft being sunk or forced to beach.

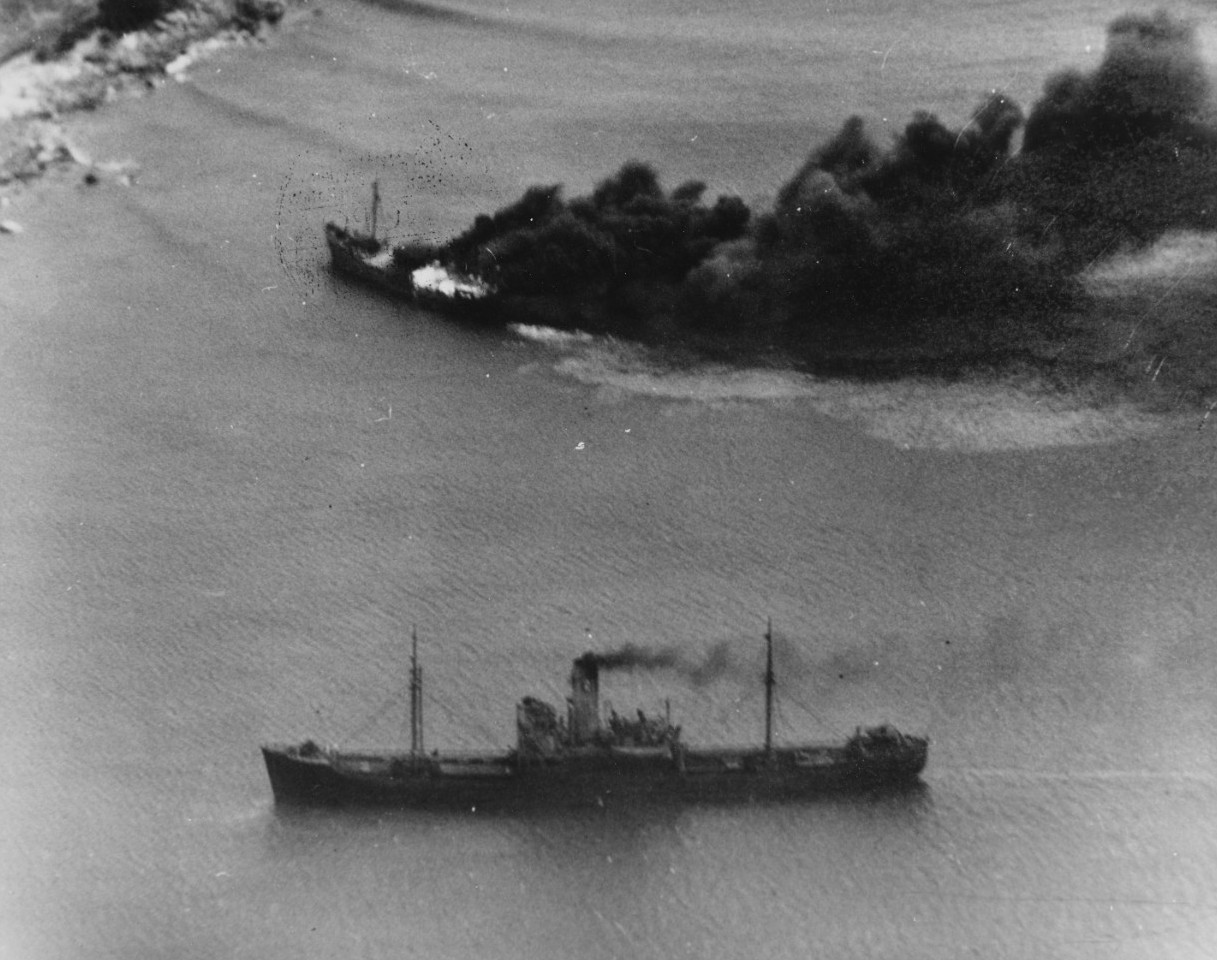
Two vessels under attack off the coast of Indochina on 12 January. The Imperial Japanese Navy tanker Ayayuki Maru is on fire and sinking.

American aircraft also struck Japanese shipping in the Saigon area. Two freighters and a tanker were sunk at Saigon, and another tanker was destroyed off the coast. The disarmed French cruiser Lamotte-Picquet was mistakenly attacked and sunk at Saigon, despite flying the French flag. Many other ships were damaged in the Saigon area, including five freighters, two tankers, three landing craft, two to four destroyer escorts, a minesweeper and a patrol boat. Several of these ships were beached, and destroyed by a storm later in the month. Other Third Fleet aircraft were used to maintain a combat air patrol over the area between Tourane in central Indochina and Saigon and attack airfields, docks and oil storage facilities. The railway station at Nha Trang and a bridge on the line between Saigon and Bien Hoa were also damaged. The surface strike group, which had separated from Task Group 38.2 at 6:40 am and comprised two battleships, two heavy cruisers, three light cruisers and twelve destroyers, did not locate any Japanese ships.

The attacks on 12 January were highly successful. A total of 46 Japanese ships were sunk, including 33 merchant vessels with a combined tonnage of 142,285 tons. Twelve of these merchants were tankers. The 13 warships sunk were the light cruiser Kashii, two destroyers, seven coast defense vessels (CD-17, CD-19, CD-23, CD-35, CD-43, CD-51, Chiburi), one patrol boat (No. 103), one minesweeper (Otowa Maru), and a military transport (T-140). While few Japanese aircraft were operational, the American airmen shot down 15 aircraft and destroyed 20 floatplanes at Cam Ranh Bay and another 77 aircraft at various airfields. The Third Fleet lost 23 aircraft. The French colonial government refused to hand over the downed American airmen its forces captured to the Japanese military, and provided them with escorts to the Chinese border. Civilians also rescued American airmen and helped them to escape. As a result, almost all of the US Navy aircrew from planes shot down over Indochina eventually returned to the United States via China.

=== Further strikes against Formosa ===
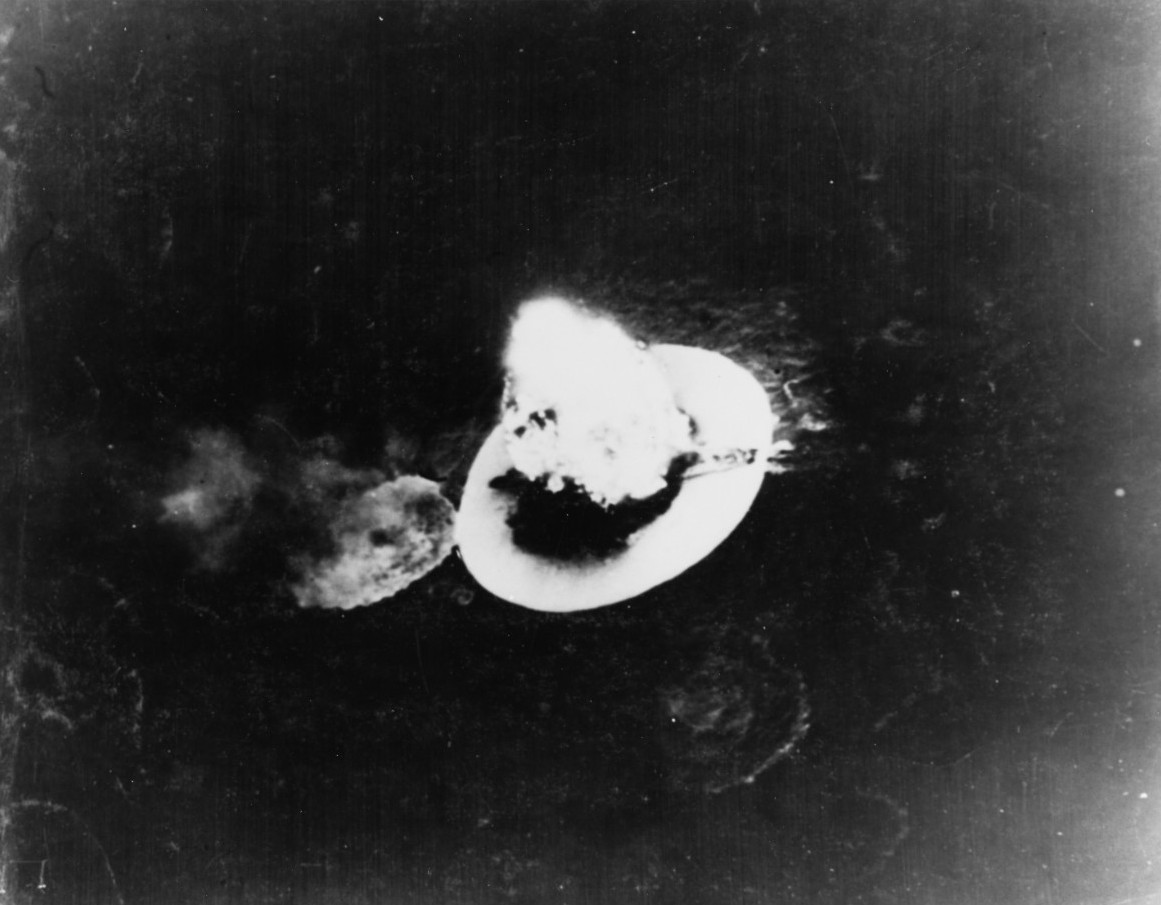
The Japanese transport ship T.14 exploding after it was attacked at Takao City on 15 January

At 7:31 pm on 12 January, the Third Fleet reversed course and sailed north-east to meet up with Task Group 30.8. This course was maintained the next day in order to evade a typhoon and Japanese search aircraft. Heavy seas made fuelling difficult, though all of the destroyers were eventually refueled on 13 January. On that day, Fleet Admiral Ernest King, the Chief of Naval Operations, directed the Third Fleet to remain "in a strategic position to intercept enemy forces approaching the Lingayen Gulf area from either the north or the south". In passing this order on to Halsey, Nimitz authorized him to attack the Hong Kong area if more worthwhile targets could not be located.

On 14 January the American warships continued to refuel, despite the bad weather. All of the major warships were eventually topped up to at least 60 per cent of their fuel capacity. This consumed most of Task Group 30.8's supplies, and it later separated from the fleet to rendezvous with relief tankers near Mindoro. After fuelling was completed the Third Fleet sailed north to attack Formosa. Weather conditions continued to be bad, and at 3:00 am on 15 January McCain recommended to Halsey that the strikes be cancelled and the fleet sail south. Even so, Halsey decided to continue north and execute the attack. In addition, he ordered aircraft to be launched during 15 January to reconnoiter Amoy, Hainan island, Hong Kong, the Pescadores Islands and Swatow in search of the Ise-class battleships. The newly designated night carrier USS Enterprise flew off search aircraft at 4:00 am that morning.

Strikes were launched from the aircraft carriers beginning at 7:30 am on 15 January; at this time the Third Fleet was about 255 miles (410 km) east-south-east of Hong Kong and 170 miles (270 km) south-west of Formosa. Ten fighter sweeps were dispatched to Formosa, and a further six to airfields on the coast of mainland China. In addition, eight raids were launched against shipping in the Takao and Toshien regions of Formosa. While large numbers of ships were located, these strikes were largely frustrated by bad weather and heavy anti-aircraft fire. The destroyer Hatakaze and No.1-class landing ship T.14 were sunk at Takao City and a tanker was damaged and forced aground. Several of the strikes were diverted to Mako in the Pescadores Islands, where weather conditions were better, and these aircraft sank the destroyer Tsuga. A weather station and radio facilities on Pratas Island was also attacked by aircraft operating from Enterprise. The American pilots claimed to have shot down 16 Japanese aircraft and destroyed another 18 on the ground during the day; 12 US Navy aircraft were lost in combat and accidents. At 4:44 pm the carriers changed course to reach the position from which Hong Kong and other locations in southern China were to be attacked the next day.

=== Attack on Hong Kong and southern China ===
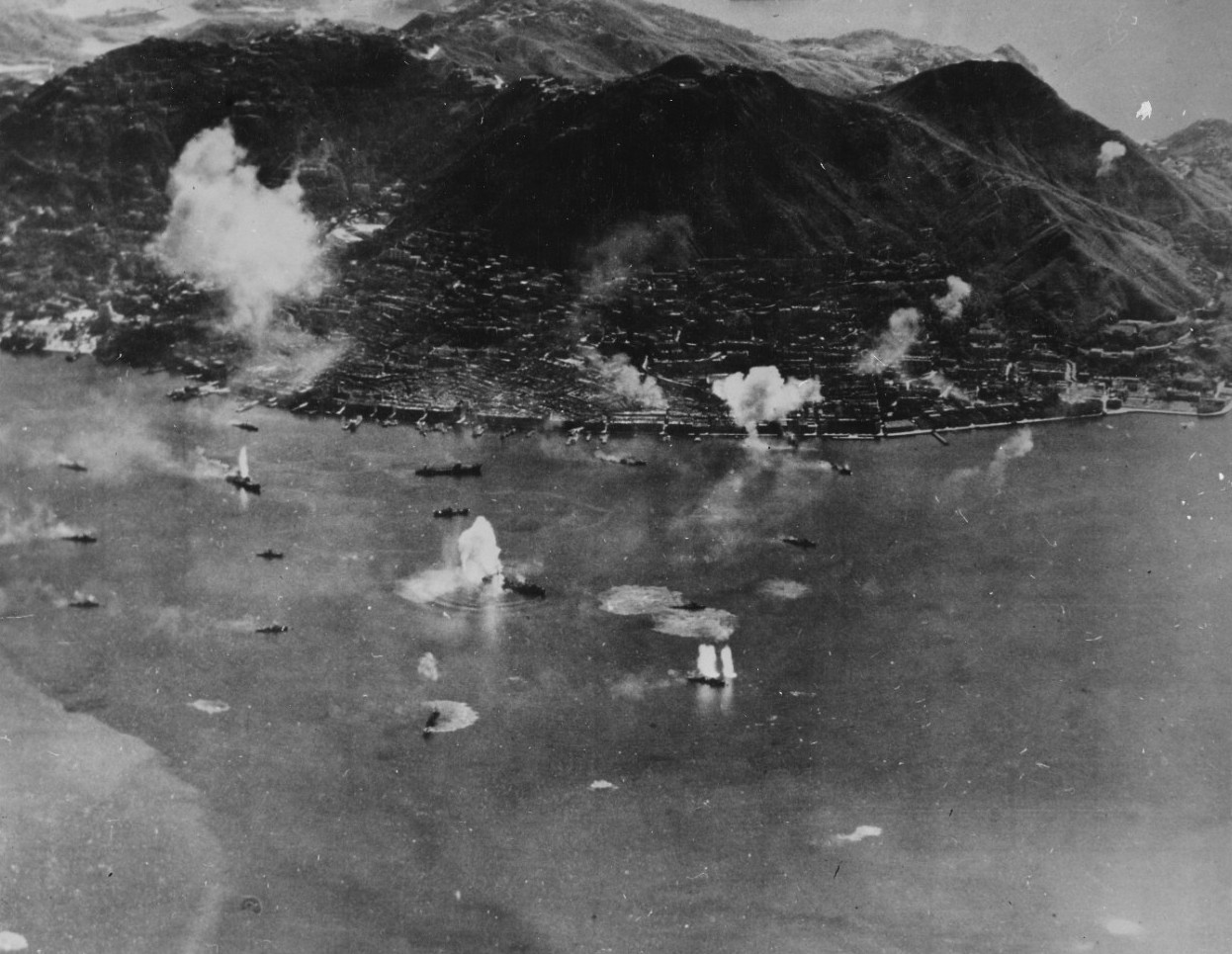
Japanese shipping at Hong Kong under attack on 16 January

The British colony of Hong Kong had been captured by Japanese forces in December 1941, and became a significant naval and logistics base. USAAF units based in China attacked the Hong Kong area from October 1942. Most of these raids involved a small number of aircraft, and typically targeted Japanese cargo ships which had been reported by Chinese guerrillas. By January 1945 the city was being regularly raided by the USAAF.

The Third Fleet's first raids for 16 January began to be launched at 7:32 am. The day's operations were focused on Hong Kong, which was struck by 138 aircraft during the morning and a further 158 in the afternoon. The raiders sunk five large tankers and an IJN oiler, and damaged several other ships. The tankers formed part of Convoy Hi 87 which had been diverted from its journey south in an attempt to avoid the Third Fleet. In addition, Kai Tak Airport was badly damaged, and all the aircraft on the ground there at the time were destroyed. Widespread damage was also inflicted on the Kowloon and Taikoo docks. Several less important targets, including the dockyard in Aberdeen and trains on the Kowloon–Canton Railway, were struck by pilots who had been authorized to engage targets of opportunity. The village of Hung Hom, which was located near the Kowloon docks, was heavily bombed and hundreds of civilians were killed or wounded. Stanley Internment Camp was also hit by a bomb that killed 14 of the Allied civilians imprisoned there. The Fourteenth Air Force's 118th Tactical Reconnaissance Squadron conducted an attack on shipping at Hong Kong on 16 January which was not coordinated with the US Navy's raids. These were the largest air attacks conducted on Hong Kong during World War II.

The Japanese garrison at Hong Kong strongly resisted the raid, using particularly effective anti-aircraft tactics which the Americans had not previously encountered. A US Navy report described the gunfire the aircraft faced as having been "intense to unbelievable". The TBF Avenger torpedo bombers dispatched against Hong Kong suffered particularly heavy losses as their low-level attack runs were vulnerable to anti-aircraft fire. As the Avengers' torpedoes were set to run too deep these attacks achieved little.

The Portuguese colony of Macau was also struck. While Portugal was neutral, the colony's government had been forced to accept the presence of Japanese "advisers" since 1943 and had traded weapons for food supplies. The raid's main target was a stockpile of aviation fuel at the Macau Naval Aviation Center which the Allies had learned from local agents was to be sold to the Japanese. Fort Dona Maria II was also attacked, possibly to destroy a radio station located within or near it, and some damage was inflicted on civilian areas and the city's harbor. Two soldiers and several civilians were killed. Macau's garrison had no effective anti-aircraft weapons, and did not fire on the American aircraft. Writing in 2016, historian Geoffrey C. Gunn stated that it was unclear why Macau was attacked given that the US Government's policy was to respect Macau's neutrality and the gains from destroying the fuel stocks were more than outweighed by the likely diplomatic repercussions. He judged that US Naval intelligence was unaware of the policy towards the colony.

Other attacks were conducted against locations in southern China during 16 January. Strikes were made on the city of Canton, and two raids and two fighter sweeps were conducted against locations in Hainan. In addition, fighter aircraft attacked airfields along the Chinese coast between the Leizhou Peninsula in the west to Swatow in the east, but encountered few Japanese aircraft.

American casualties on 16 January were 22 aircraft shot down in combat and 27 lost in accidents. The Japanese claimed to have downed 10 aircraft over Hong Kong alone. The US Navy pilots reported destroying 13 Japanese aircraft. At least four American airmen were taken prisoner after their planes were shot down near Hong Kong, and a further seven evaded capture and eventually reached Allied-held regions of China. One of the American prisoners was later murdered by a lethal injection at the Ōfuna prisoner of war camp in Japan.

=== Exit from the South China Sea ===
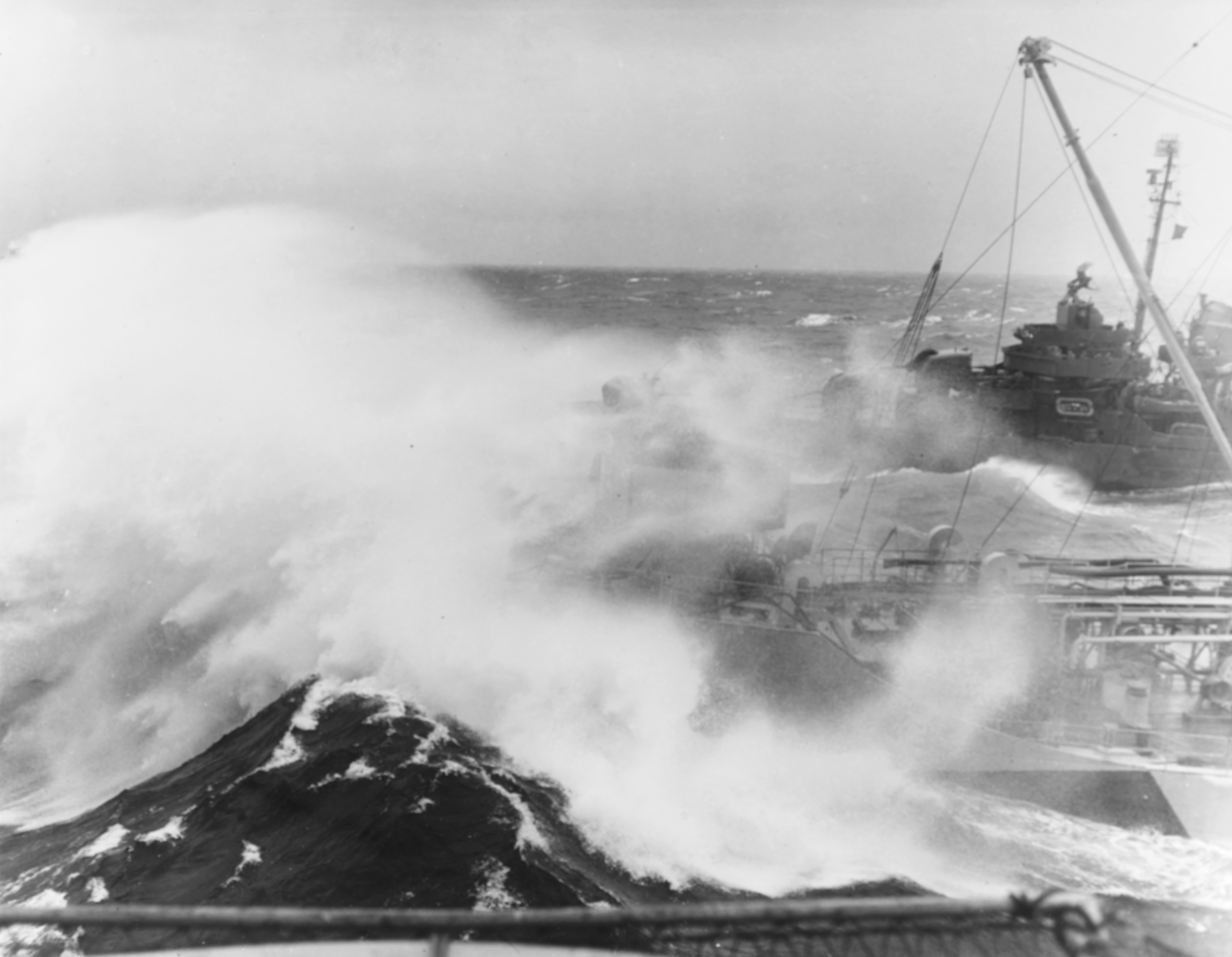
Fleet oiler USS Pamanset refueling USS Essex and a destroyer during a sea storm on 17 January 1945

After completing its strikes on 16 January, the Third Fleet turned south to refuel. Because weather conditions were particularly bad the next day, fuelling was not completed. The weather worsened on 18 January, making fuelling operations impossible. During this period Japanese propaganda radio broadcasts claimed that the fleet had been "bottled up", and would be destroyed when it tried to leave the South China Sea. As his meteorologists expected bad weather to continue into 19 January, Halsey decided to depart the South China Sea via the Surigao Strait in the central Philippines rather than sail north around Luzon. When Nimitz learned of this he requested that the Third Fleet use the Luzon Strait, though Halsey was given discretion to make the final decision on his force's route. Nimitz's reasoning was that if the fleet sailed through the central Philippines its departure would be reported by Japanese forces on bypassed islands, possibly leading to IJN raids against the Allied supply lines. A northerly passage would also leave the Third Fleet better placed to undertake its next assignments, which included attacking Formosa again and reconnoitering the Ryukyu Islands.

Halsey chose to follow Nimitz's request. His fleet completed fuelling on 19 January, and proceeded north towards the Balintang Channel; Task Group 30.8 separated from the main body, however, and subsequently passed through the Surigao Strait. During 20 January the fleet sailed east through the Balintang Channel, with a division of destroyers patrolling well ahead of the carrier task groups. Many Japanese aircraft were detected by radar during this period and 15 which were evacuating IJAAF personnel from Luzon were shot down. No attack was made against the American force. The Third Fleet exited the Balintang Channel at 22:00 that night.

== Aftermath ==
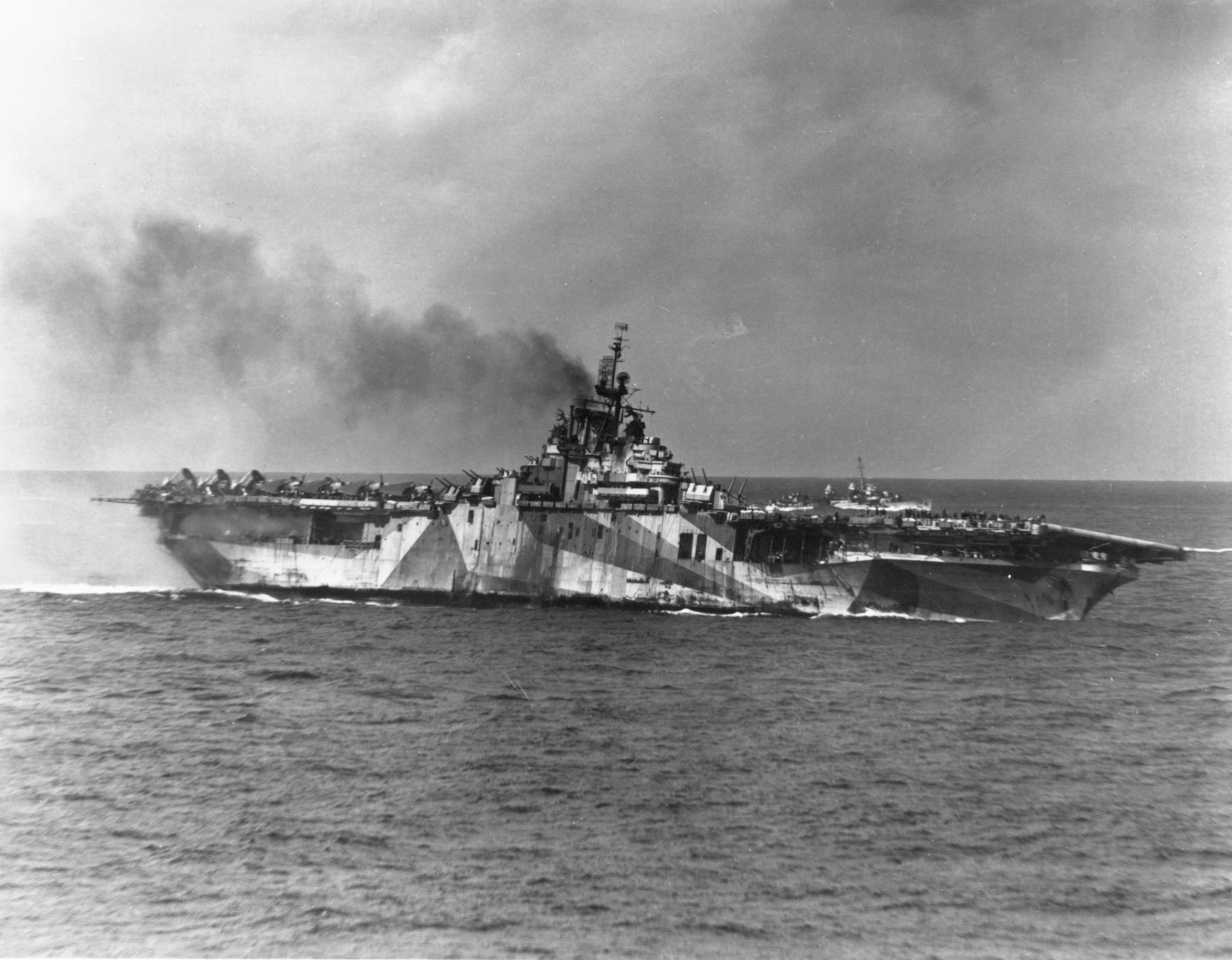
USS Ticonderoga listing after kamikaze attacks, 21 January 1945.

After departing the South China Sea, the Third Fleet proceeded to its next assignments. It attacked airfields and harbors on Formosa again on 21 January, with ten merchant ships being sunk at Takao. But a Japanese aircraft struck the light aircraft carrier USS Langley with two small bombs and the fleet carrier Ticonderoga was badly damaged by two kamikazes. The destroyer Maddox was also hit by a kamikaze but suffered little damage. In addition, McCain's flagship Hancock suffered considerable damage when a bomb fell from a TBF Avenger which had just landed and exploded on her flight deck. Hancock and Ticonderoga were detached from the fleet, and proceeded to Ulithi for repairs. On 22 January the remaining carriers struck the Ryukyu Islands. The main goal of this operation was to gain photographic coverage of Okinawa to help plan an invasion of the island, and airfields and shipping were also attacked. Once this task was completed, the fleet turned south for Ulithi in the evening of 22 January, and arrived there on 25 January. The next day Halsey handed command over to Spruance, and it became the Fifth Fleet.

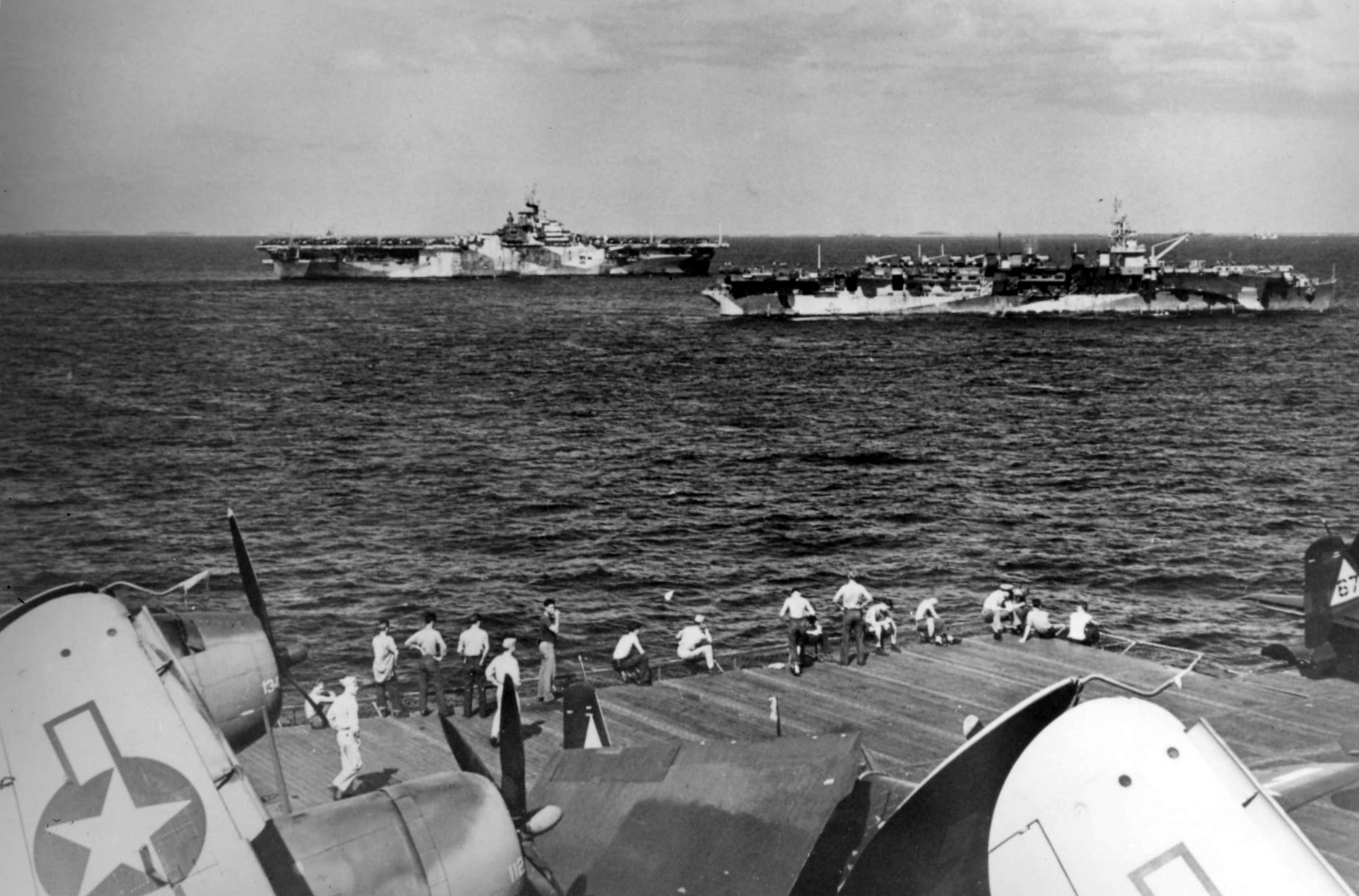
USS Hornet (left) and USS Independence on 26 January 1945

The South China Sea raid was considered a success. During its operations in the South China Sea between 10 and 20 January, the Third Fleet sailed 3,800 miles (6,100 km) without suffering heavy casualties or a serious mishap. Nimitz later stated that "the sortie into the South China Sea was well-conceived and brilliantly executed" and praised the planning for the fleet's logistical support. He regretted that Japanese capital ships had not been located and attacked. In 1995 the historian John Prados wrote that the Japanese "convoy losses off French Indochina were the most significant outcome of Operation Gratitude". Similarly, Mark P. Parillo judged in 1993 that the destruction of 25 oil tankers during the raid "spelled doom for any long-term Japanese resistance".

The Japanese high command believed that the raid had been conducted in preparation for an invasion of south China. In response, five additional infantry divisions were assigned to the defense of this area. Three of these divisions were released for other operations in March 1945 after the American invasion of Iwo Jima was interpreted as evidence that the Hong Kong-Canton area would be bypassed rather than attacked.

The South China Sea raid also contributed to the Japanese takeover of Indochina. The commander of the Imperial Japanese Army forces in Indochina, Lieutenant General Yuitsu Tsuchihashi, believed that the raid was the precursor an Allied invasion of the area. In reality, President Franklin D. Roosevelt had decided that the US would not participate in the liberation of Indochina and there were no plans for such an operation. As part of efforts to prepare for an Allied invasion and pre-empt the French uprising, on 26 February the Japanese Government authorized the military command in Indochina to execute the takeover plans once preparations were complete. This occurred on 9 March, with the Japanese forces attacking and rapidly defeating most of the French garrisons. The Japanese subsequently installed Emperor Bao Dai to rule over the puppet Empire of Vietnam, Kingdom of Cambodia and Kingdom of Laos.

The Portuguese Government lodged a protest over the US Navy's violation of Macau's neutrality shortly after the raid on 16 January, and the US Government apologized for the incident on 20 January. An official court of inquiry was held, and in 1950 the United States provided Portugal with a $20.3 million compensation payment for the damage caused to Macau's harbor on 16 January and other accidental raids on 11 and 25 June 1945.

Allied air and naval attacks against Japanese shipping in the South China Sea were expanded during early 1945 as additional USAAF units moved into bases in the Philippines. Land-based patrol aircraft and medium bombers operated over the sea from liberated areas of the Philippines and Dutch East Indies from February. While Allied submarines and these aircraft failed to prevent the escape of the Ise-class battleships when they sailed from Singapore to Japan during Operation Kita in mid-February, the medium bombers were sinking large numbers of Japanese merchant ships by the end of the month. Medium and heavy bombers also raided Japanese-held ports across the South China Sea area. As a result of the air and submarine attacks, the Japanese ceased sending ships through the South China Sea in April 1945.

== Bibliography ==
- Axelrod, Alan; Kingston, Jack A. (2007). Encyclopedia of World War II, Volume 1. New York City: H W Fowler. ISBN 978-0816060221.
- Bailey, Steven K. (2007). Strolling in Macau: A Visitor's Guide to Macau, Taipa, and Coloane. San Francisco: ThingsAsian Press. ISBN 978-0971594098.
- Bailey, Steven K. (2017). "The Bombing of Bungalow C: Friendly Fire at the Stanley Civilian Internment Camp". Journal of the Royal Asiatic Society Hong Kong Branch. 57: 108–126. JSTOR 90013953.
- Brown, J.D. (2009). Hobbs, David (ed.). Carrier Operations in World War II. Annapolis: Naval Institute Press. ISBN 978-1591141082.
- Chi Man, Kwong; Yiu Lun, Tsoi (2014). Eastern Fortress: A Military History of Hong Kong, 1840–1970. Hong Kong: Hong Kong University Press. ISBN 978-9888208715.
- Craven, Wesley; Cate, James, eds. (1953). The Pacific: Matterhorn to Nagasaki. The Army Air Forces in World War II. Volume V. Chicago: The University of Chicago Press. OCLC 256469807.
- Dommen, Arthur J. (2001). The Indochinese Experience of the French and the Americans: Nationalism and Communism in Cambodia, Laos, and Vietnam. Bloomington, Indiana: Indiana University Press. ISBN 0253338549.
- Emerson, Geoffrey Charles (2008). Hong Kong Internment, 1942–1945: Life in the Japanese Civilian Camp at Stanley. Hong Kong: Hong Kong University Press. ISBN 978-9622098800.
- Faulkner, Marcus (2012). War at Sea: A Naval Atlas, 1939–1945. Annapolis, Maryland: Naval Institute Press. ISBN 978-1591145608.
- Garrett, Richard J. (2010). The Defences of Macau: Forts, Ships and Weapons over 450 Years. Hong Kong: Hong Kong University Press. ISBN 978-9888028498.
- Gunn, Geoffrey C. (2016). "Epilogue". In Gunn, Geoffrey C. (ed.). Wartime Macau: Under the Japanese Shadow. Hong Kong: Hong Kong University Press. pp. 166–177. ISBN 978-9888390519.
- Halsey, William F.; Bryan, J (1947). Admiral Halsey's Story. London: Whittlesey House. OCLC 234257675.
- Hornfischer, James D. (2016). The Fleet at Flood Tide: America at Total War in the Pacific, 1944–1945. New York City: Random House Publishing Group. ISBN 978-0345548719.
- Japanese Research Division, Headquarters Far East Command (1980) [1952]. "French Indo-China Operations Record [Japanese Monograph No. 25]". War in Asia and the Pacific: Volume 6 The Southern Area (Part I). New York City: Garland. ISBN 082403290X.
- Morison, Samuel Eliot (2002) [1959]. The Liberation of the Philippines: Luzon, Mindanao, the Visayas, 1944–1945. History of United States Naval Operations in World War II. Urbana, Illinois: University of Illinois Press. ISBN 025207064X.
- Parillo, Mark P. (1993). The Japanese Merchant Marine in World War II. Annapolis: Naval Institute Press. ISBN 1557506779.
- Potter, E.B. (1985). Bull Halsey. Annapolis, Maryland: Naval Institute Press. ISBN 0870211463.
- Prados, John (1995). Combined Fleet Decoded: The Secret History of American Intelligence and the Japanese Navy in World War II. New York City: Random House. ISBN 0679437010.
- Reynolds, Clark G. (1968). The Fast Carriers: The Forging of an Air Navy. New York City: McGraw-Hill. OCLC 24906505.
- Royal Navy (1995). War with Japan: Volume VI The Advance to Japan. London: HMSO. ISBN 0117728217.
- Smith, R.B. (2008). Communist Indochina. London: Routledge. ISBN 978-0415468046.
- Spector, Ronald (February 1982). "Allied Intelligence and Indochina, 1943–1945". Pacific Historical Review. 51 (1): 23–50. doi:10.2307/3639819. JSTOR 3639819.
- Spector, Ronald H. (1985). Advice and Support: The Early Years (PDF). The US Army in Vietnam. Washington, D.C.: Center of Military History. OCLC 220653520. Archived from the original (PDF) on September 26, 2012.
- Stille, Mark (2017). Imperial Japanese Navy Antisubmarine Escorts 1941–45. Oxford: Osprey. ISBN 978-1472818164.
