= Air raids on Hong Kong =

World War II aerial bombings

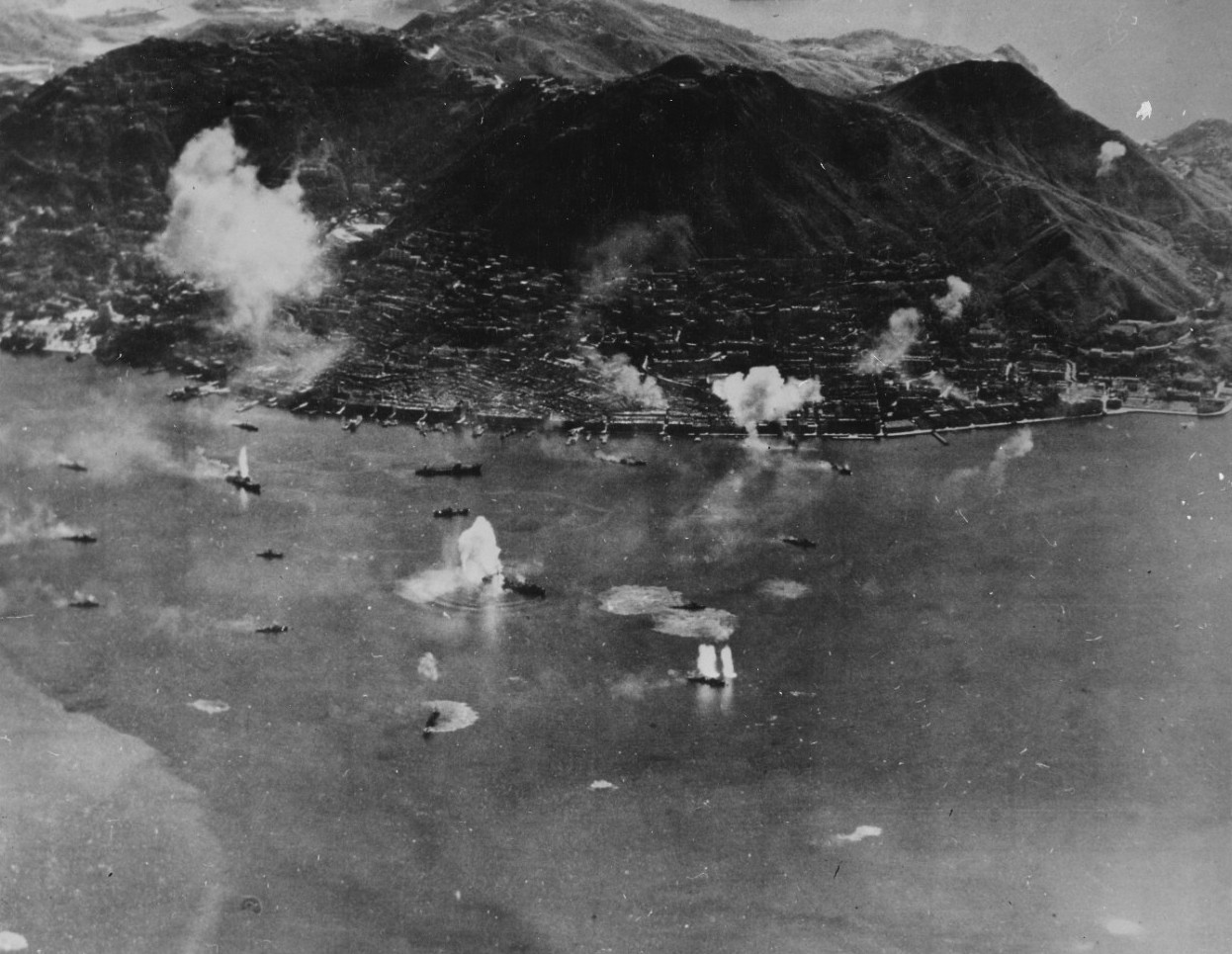
Japanese shipping at Hong Kong under attack by United States Navy aircraft on 16 January 1945

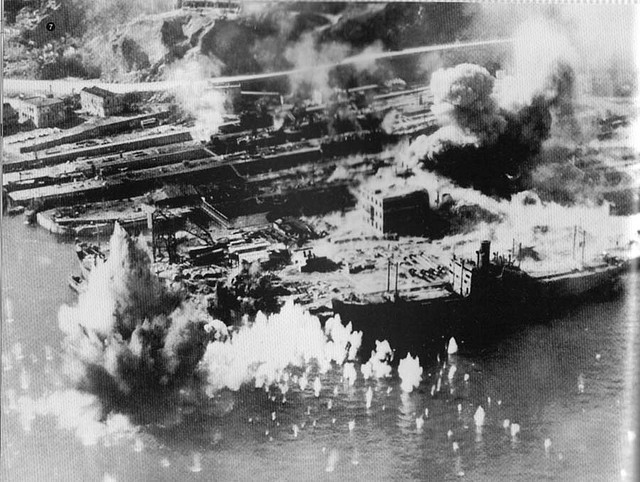
Taikoo Dockyard, Hong Kong, under attack on 16 January. The ship in the photo is the tanker (converted ore carrier) Yamasachi Maru.

The United States Army Air Forces and United States Navy conducted numerous air raids against Japanese-occupied Hong Kong and shipping near the city during World War II. The Royal Australian Air Force took part in efforts to lay naval mines in the Hong Kong area. These attacks began in 1942. In 1945 it was incorporated into the larger South China Sea raid. British Pacific Fleet aircraft also attacked Japanese suicide boats at Hong Kong as part of the reoccupation of the colony in late August 1945.

== Background ==
The British colony of Hong Kong had been captured by Japanese forces in December 1941, and became a significant naval and logistics base. Japanese forces bombed and shelled the urban areas during the invasion of Hong Kong, and 4,000 civilians were killed in the fighting.

USAAF units based in China attacked the Hong Kong area from October 1942. Most of these raids involved a small number of aircraft, and typically targeted Japanese cargo ships which had been reported by Chinese guerrillas. By January 1945 the city was being regularly raided by the USAAF.

== Attacks ==
=== 1942 ===
- 25 October: 12 North American B-25 Mitchell medium bombers and 7 Curtiss P-40 Warhawk fighters attacked the Kowloon Docks, and were intercepted by 21 Japanese aircraft. One B-25 and one P-40 were shot down, along with most of the Japanese aircraft.
- 25/26 October: 6 B-25s attacked the North Point Power Station in a night raid.
- 26 October: P-40s made dive bombing attacks on the Hong Kong-Canton area.
- 27 November: 10 B-25s and more than 20 P-40s attacked shipping and harbour facilities at Hong Kong. The American aircrew claimed to have sunk two freighters and numerous barges, and shot down several of the large force of Japanese fighters which intercepted them. No ships were reported lost in Hong Kong but the freighter Ryokusei Maru (built 1902, 1907 gross tons ex Keisho Go or Hwei Chong (Japan/Chinese reading of same characters) operated by Toa Kaiun was attacked by 7 B-25s and many P-40s and sunk off Whampoa this day.

=== 1943 ===
- 27 July: 6 B-25s escorted by 14 fighters attacked Stonecutters Island after failing to locate the freighter they had been dispatched to destroy.
- 28 July: 6 B-25s escorted by 9 P-40s bombed the Taikoo Dockyard.
- 29 July: 18 Consolidated B-24 Liberator heavy bombers with fighter escort attacked the Hong Kong, Kowloon and Taikoo Docks and the shipyard previously used by the Royal Navy.
- 7 August: 4 P-40s attacked a Japanese convoy sailing to the east of Hong Kong. One freighter was heavily damaged and two others were lightly damaged. Note that no Japanese records confirm this attack.
- 25 August: 8 B-25s escorted by fighters bombed the Kowloon Docks.
- 26 August: 15 B-24s escorted by 17 fighters bombed the Kowloon Docks. Five Japanese fighters were shot down.
- 30 August: 4 P-40s attacked a convoy sailing to the east of Hong Kong, badly damaging a freighter and inflicting lighter damage on two others. The ships attacked were part of a 3 ship convoy sailing from Hong Kong to Mako (Makung). 3 P-40s attacked the convoy at about 1545 JST and one ship, Columbia Maru was lightly damaged in 22.15N 114.24E. The ships were escorted by the gunboat Hashidate and returned to Hong Kong at 1800 that day and set out again at 0100 the following morning.
- 31 August: 3 P-40s attacked a freighter near Stonecutters Island, with their pilots claiming to have heavily damaged it.
- 12 September: 8 Lockheed P-38 Lightning fighters attacked Japanese shipping in the Hong Kong area.
- 15 November: 20 B-25s were dispatched to attack targets in the Hong Kong area. Due to bad weather, only 5 attacked. These aircraft targeted the Kowloon Docks.
- 19 November: B-25s attacked two Japanese ships sailing near Hong Kong. Note that no Japanese records confirm this attack.
- 1 December: 19 B-25s, 24 P-40s and 10 North American P-51 Mustang fighters attacked the Kowloon Docks. Two other B-25s attacked the Taikoo Dockyard.
- 25 December: 2 B-25s attacked a passenger ship sailing south of Hong Kong, with their aircrew claiming to have heavily damaged it.Note that no Japanese records confirm this attack.

=== 1944 ===
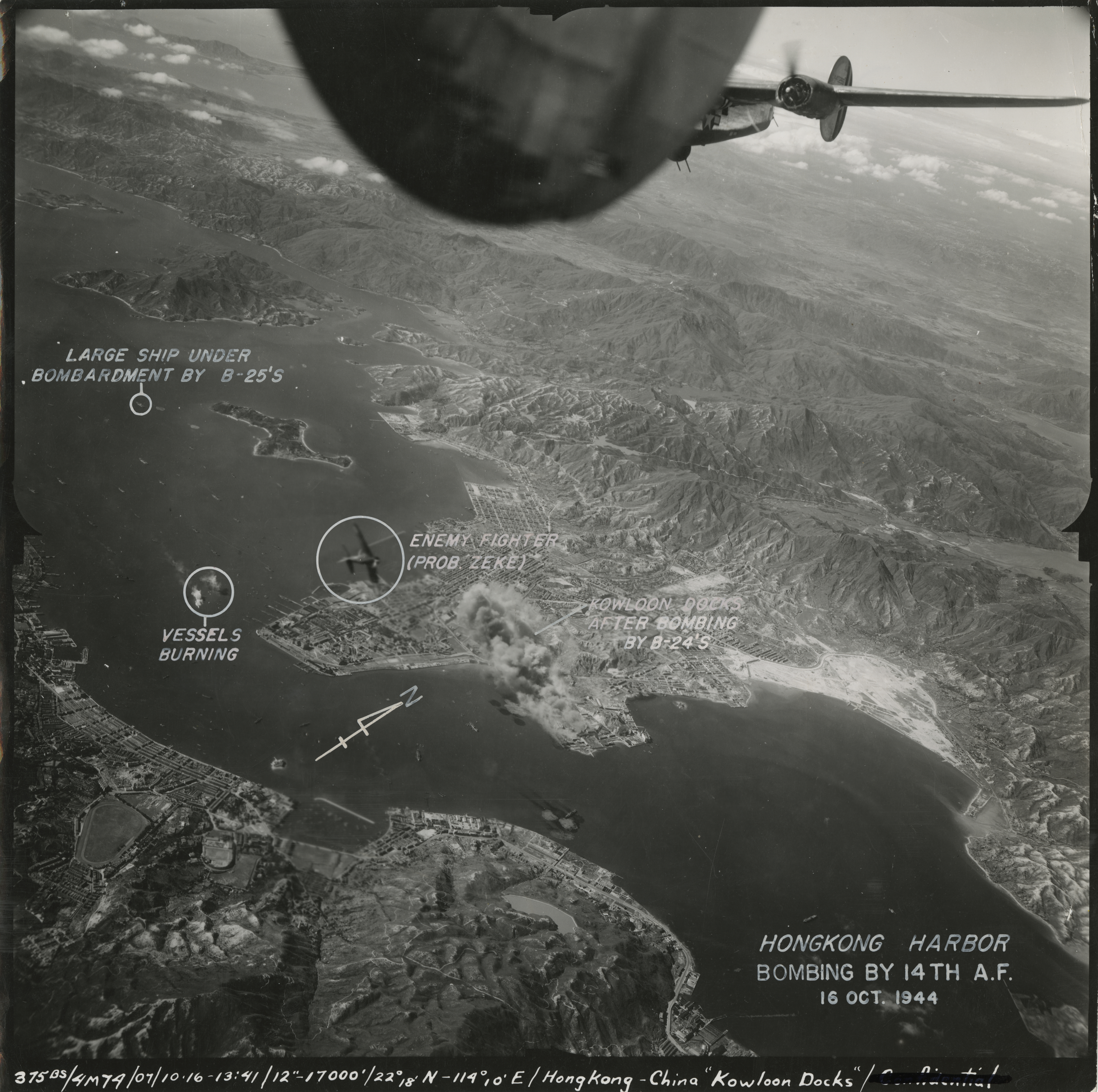
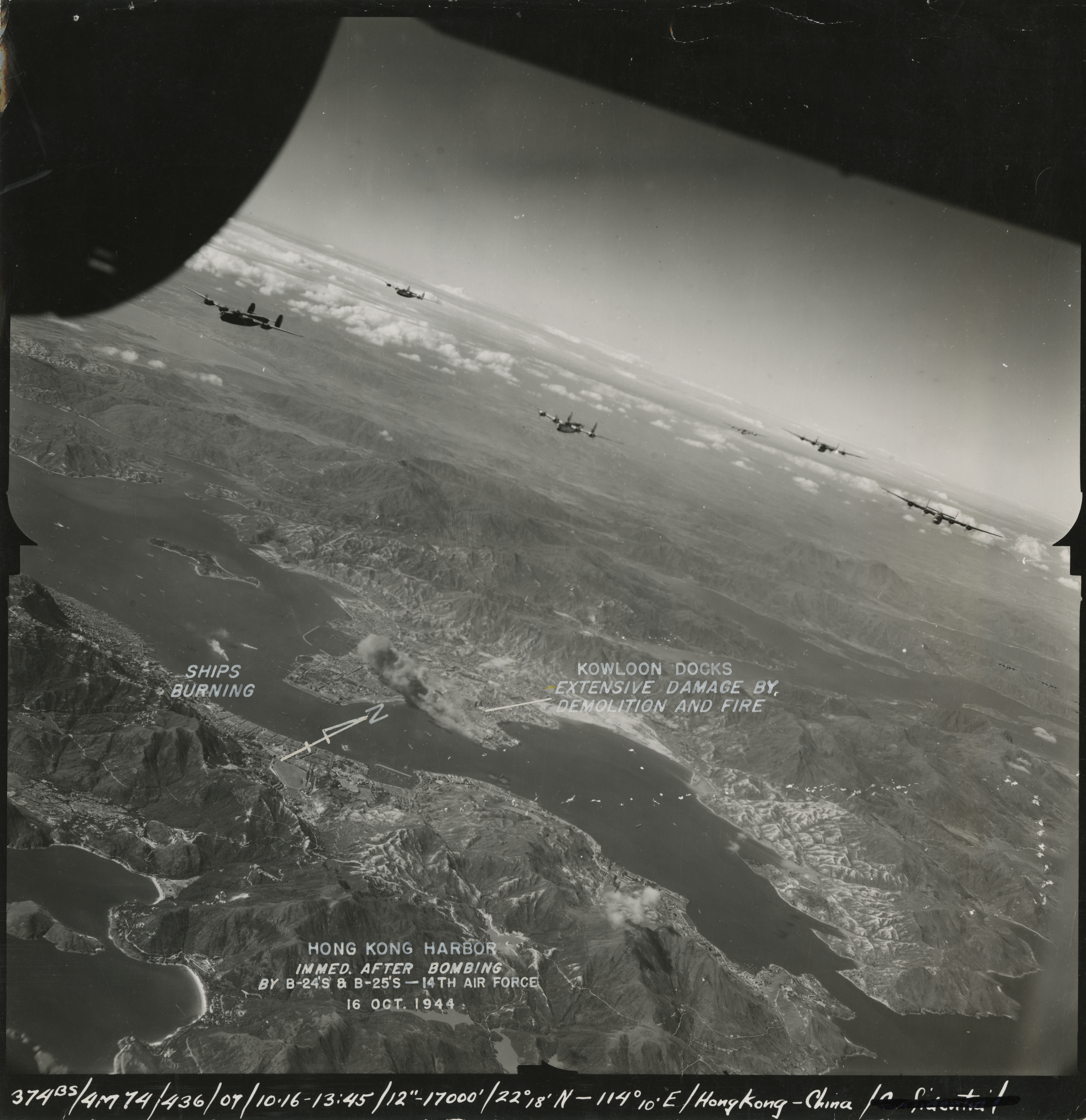
Two photos featuring the raid on Kowloon Docks on 16 October 1944. The Fourteenth Air Force sent 28 B-24s, 33 P-51s and 18 P-40s to Hong Kong that day. The broad sweep of open land in the middle right of both photo was the Japanese-controlled Kai Tak airfield.
- 7 January: 2 B-25s attacked a passenger ship to the south of Hong Kong. Their aircrew claimed to have sunk it. No Japanese records support this attack.
- 11 January: 4 B-24s dropped naval mines off Hong Kong and Takao in Formosa. 1 of the aircraft was shot down.
- 23 January: 28 P-40s and 9 B-25s attacked Kai Tak airfield.
- 5 February: 2 B-24s and 2 B-25s attacked a convoy sailing to the east of Hong Kong. Their aircrew claimed to have sunk two freighters and 3 smaller ships. This was convoy No. 71. Seikyo Maru (built 1934 2565gt) was sunk after an attack by 2 B-24s. Suzan (Sungshan) Maru (built 1920 2539gt) and Rozan (Lushan) Maru (built 1920 2531gt) were also sunk and Gyoyu Maru (built 1918, 2232gt) was lightly damaged as was the sole escort, torpedo boat Hatsukari.
- 12 May: An Imperial Japanese Navy ship was attacked by P-40s or B-25s at Hong Kong.
- 19 May: 2 B-24s attack and badly damage 2 freighters sailing to the south of Hong Kong.
- 20 May: 13 B-24s attack a convoy sailing to the south of Hong Kong. Their crews claim to have destroyed 2 Motor Launches and damaged several larger vessels. 3 of the B-24s were destroyed.
- 22 May: 2 B-25s attacked and heavily damaged a cargo ship near Hong Kong.
- 7 September: 5 B-24s attacked and damaged 4 freighters sailing to the south-west of Hong Kong.
- 8 September: B-24s attacked a Japanese destroyer sailing to the south of Hong Kong. Their crews claimed to have sunk the warship.
- 16 October: 28 B-24s, 33 P-51s and 18 P-40s (all belonging to the Fourteenth Air Force) attacked an airfield and shipping in the Hong Kong area.
- 6 December: 15 P-51s attacked shipping at Hong Kong. Their pilots claimed to have sunk a destroyer and a freighter.
- 19 December: 4 P-51s attacked 2 freighters sailing near Hong Kong, with their pilots claiming to have sunk both.
- 20 December: P-40s and P-51s attacked road traffic, trains and shipping at Hong Kong as part of a wide-ranging sweep over southern China and eastern Burma.
- 24 December: Shipping is attacked in the Hong Kong area, with the American airmen claiming to have sunk 1 vessel and damaged several others.
- 7 January: 2 B-25s attacked a passenger ship to the south of Hong Kong. Their aircrew claimed to have sunk it.
- 11 January: 4 B-24s dropped naval mines off Hong Kong and Takao in Formosa. 1 of the aircraft was shot down.
- 23 January: 28 P-40s and 9 B-25s attacked Kai Tak airfield.
- 5 February: 2 B-24s and 2 B-25s attacked a convoy sailing to the east of Hong Kong. Their aircrew claimed to have sunk two freighters and 3 smaller ships.
- 12 May: An Imperial Japanese Navy ship was attacked by P-40s or B-25s at Hong Kong.
- 19 May: 2 B-24s attack and badly damage 2 freighters sailing to the south of Hong Kong.
- 20 May: 13 B-24s attack a convoy sailing to the south of Hong Kong. Their crews claim to have destroyed 2 Motor Launches and damaged several larger vessels. 3 of the B-24s were destroyed.
- 22 May: 2 B-25s attacked and heavily damaged a cargo ship near Hong Kong.
- 7 September: 5 B-24s attacked and damaged 4 freighters sailing to the south-west of Hong Kong.
- 8 September: B-24s attacked a Japanese destroyer sailing to the south of Hong Kong. Their crews claimed to have sunk the warship.
- 15 October: 28 B-24s, 33 P-51s and 18 P-40s (all belonging to the Fourteenth Air Force) attacked an airfield and shipping in Hong Kong.
- 6 December: 15 P-51s attacked shipping at Hong Kong. Their pilots claimed to have sunk a destroyer and a freighter.
- 19 December: 4 P-51s attacked 2 freighters sailing near Hong Kong, with their pilots claiming to have sunk both.
- 20 December: P-40s and P-51s attacked road traffic, trains and shipping at Hong Kong as part of a wide-ranging sweep over southern China and eastern Burma.
- 24 December: Shipping is attacked in the Hong Kong area, with the American airmen claiming to have sunk 1 vessel and damaged several others.

=== 1945 ===
- 15 January: American aircraft attacked Hong Kong as part of a large series of raids.
- 16 January: As part of the South China Sea raid, aircraft flying from United States Navy aircraft carriers made two large raids on the Hong Kong area. 138 aircraft were dispatched in the morning and 158 in the afternoon. Many targets were attacked, including shipping, harbour facilities, Kai Tak airfield and trains on the Kowloon–Canton Railway. Hundreds of civilians were killed or wounded when the village of Hung Hom was mistakenly attacked. Stanley Internment Camp was also hit by a bomb which killed 14 of the Allied civilians imprisoned there. Japanese forces strongly resisted the raid, and claimed to have shot down 10 American aircraft. At least 4 American airmen were taken prisoner after their planes were shot down near Hong Kong, and a further 7 evaded capture and eventually reached Allied-held regions of China.
- 16 January: Aircraft assigned to the 118th Tactical Reconnaissance Squadron also attacked shipping at Hong Kong. This raid was not coordinated with the US Navy attacks.
- 18 January: 29 B-24s bombed Hong Kong. 25 P-40s attacked shipping and railroad targets at Hong Kong. Other American fighters conducting armed reconnaissance patrols also attacked targets in Hong Kong.
- 21 January: 30 B-24s bombed Hong Kong.
- 27 February: B-25s sank 10 to 15 junks near Hong Kong.
- March: Royal Australian Air Force (RAAF) Consolidated PBY Catalinas reinforced existing minefields at Hong Kong.
- 2 April: 37 B-24s escorted by P-38s bombed the Kowloon and Taikoo docks. Two Japanese Nakajima Ki-44 fighters attempted to intercept, but were driven off by the P-38s.
- 3 April: 43 B-24s bombed dockyards at Hong Kong. Two cargo ships were sunk and twelve hits were scored on oil storage tanks. 11 of the B-24s were damaged by anti-aircraft gunfire.
- 4 April: 41 B-24s bombed Hong Kong. Shipping in the city's harbour and docks were damaged. The aircrew also claimed to have damaged oil storage facilities and a power plant.
- 5 April: 20 B-24s bombed the Kowloon docks and Kai Tak airfield.
- 5 April: 3 Douglas A-20 Havoc light bombers attacked a convoy near Hong Kong. A cargo vessel was sunk and two escort warships damaged.
- 8 April: RAAF Catalinas laid mines at Hong Kong. Australian aircraft also conducted mine-laying sorties on other dates in April.
- 13 April: B-24s bombed the Taikoo Docks.
- 14 April: B-25s attacked shipping in the Hong Kong-Canton area.
- May: Australian and United States aircraft conducted many mine-laying sorties to close the two main shipping channels at Hong Kong.
- 12 June: B-24s bombed the former Royal Navy yard and other dock areas at Hong Kong, causing extensive damage.
- 13 June: 62 B-24s attacked wooden ships in Hong Kong Harbour with napalm. Many vessels were destroyed.
- 30 August: Aircraft flying from British Pacific Fleet aircraft carriers attacked three Japanese suicide boats which were headed towards the fleet during the reoccupation of Hong Kong. One of the suicide boats was sunk, one beached and the other returned to an anchorage of these craft at Picnic Bay on Lamma Island. Other suicide boats at Picnic Bay were subsequently attacked.

== Aftermath ==
The air attacks on Hong Kong are little remembered today. Unexploded bombs dropped during the war are occasionally unearthed during construction projects, and need to be defused. The only occasion when unexploded aerial bombs have resulted in casualties occurred in 1993, when a ship dredging shallow water near Tsing Yi detonated a 225-kilogram (496 lb) bomb. The explosion badly damaged the ship and injured one of its crew. In the five years to 2018, the Hong Kong media reported 35 discoveries of unexploded munitions. Two more bombs, probably dropped in the 16 January 1945 raid, were discovered and defused in early 2018. It is likely that many more unexploded bombs will be discovered in the future.
