= Fort Dona Maria II =

- Fortaleza de Dona Maria II
- Macau in China
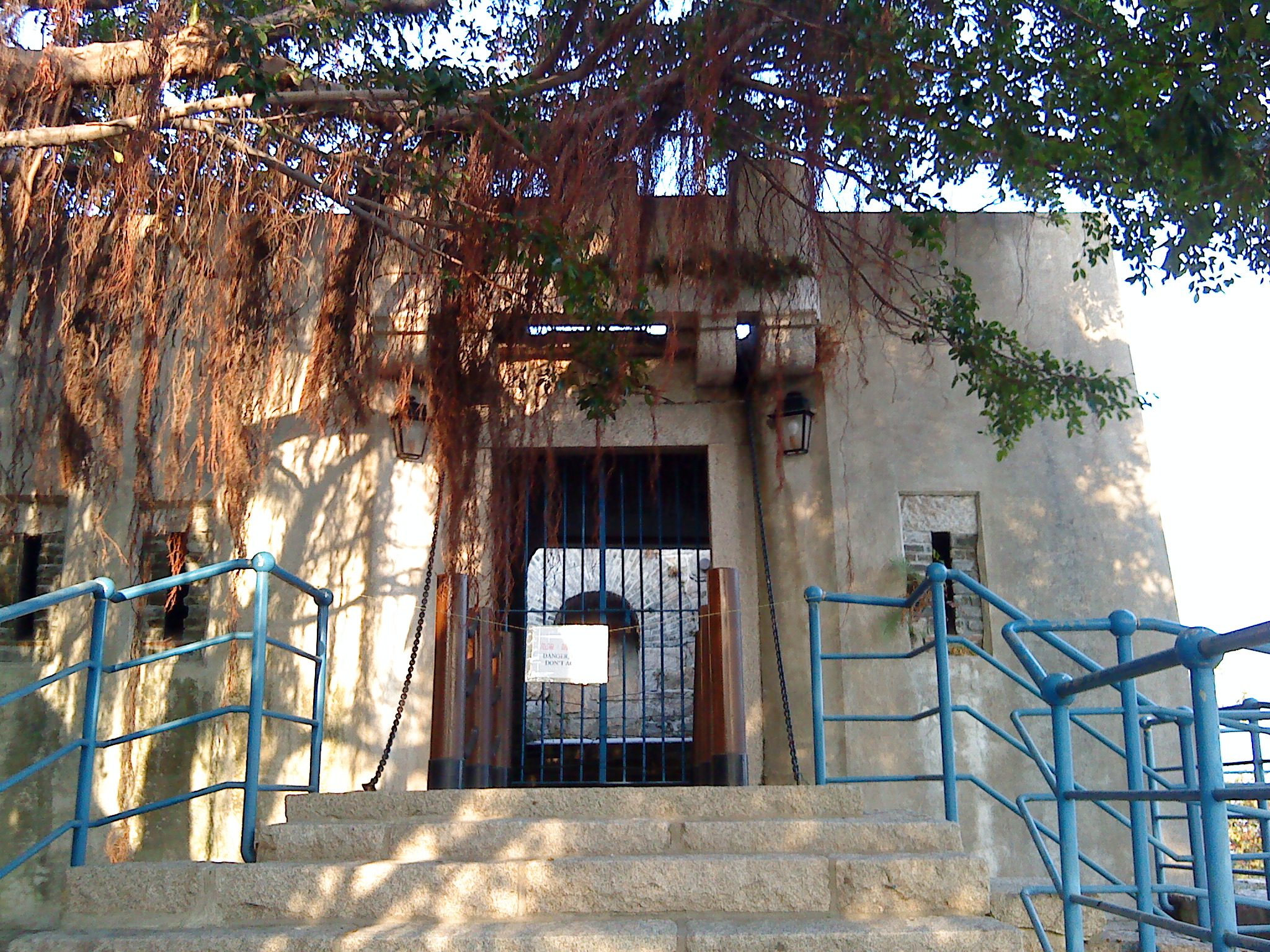

Site information
- Controlled by: Portuguese Empire; China
- Condition: Good

Location
- Coordinates: 22°12′12″N 113°33′20″E

Site history
- Built: 1852

The Fort Dona Maria II (Fortaleza de Dona Maria II in Portuguese) is located in Macau, in China.

== History ==
Fort Dona Maria II was erected in 1852 to replace the one constructed by the Portuguese in the neighbouring hill of Mong-Ha. Both were maintained to cross their fires and better defend Macau from land attacks or seaborne attacks from the Cacilhas Bay, one of the few places in the east coast of Macau were landings were possible.

The fort, along with its moat and drawbridge, bears an irregular hexagonal shape. It was built of stone and mortar, brick battlements, and granite lintels, probably under the supervision of engineer major António de Azevedo Cuna. Entrance is made via a tunnel which includes traditional shooting slits.

It was renovated in 1871 and 1872, but by 1899 the fort was deactivated.

On January 16, 1945, during World War II, the fort was bombed by American aircraft, although it is unclear whether the attack was accidental or not.

== See also ==
- Portuguese Macau
