= Battle of Midway order of battle =

IJ Combined Fleet and US Pacific Fleet Commanders

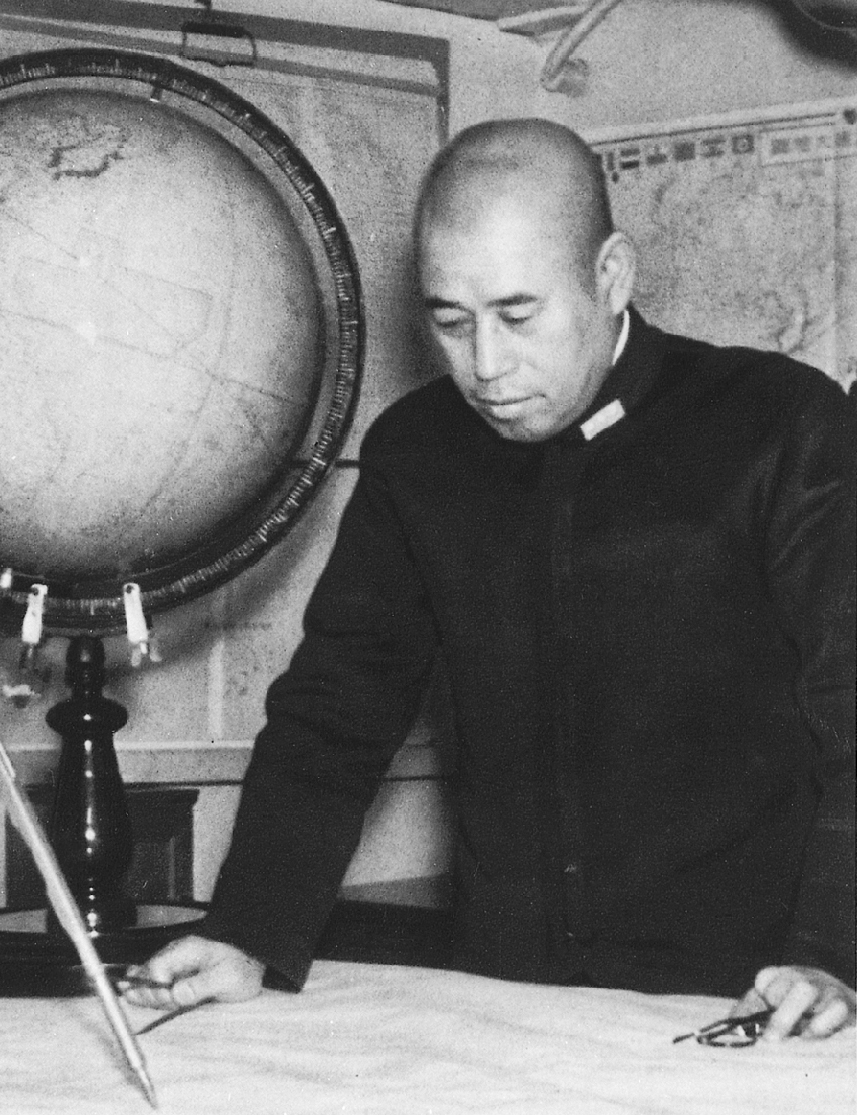
Adm. Isoroku Yamamoto (HQ aboard BB Yamato)

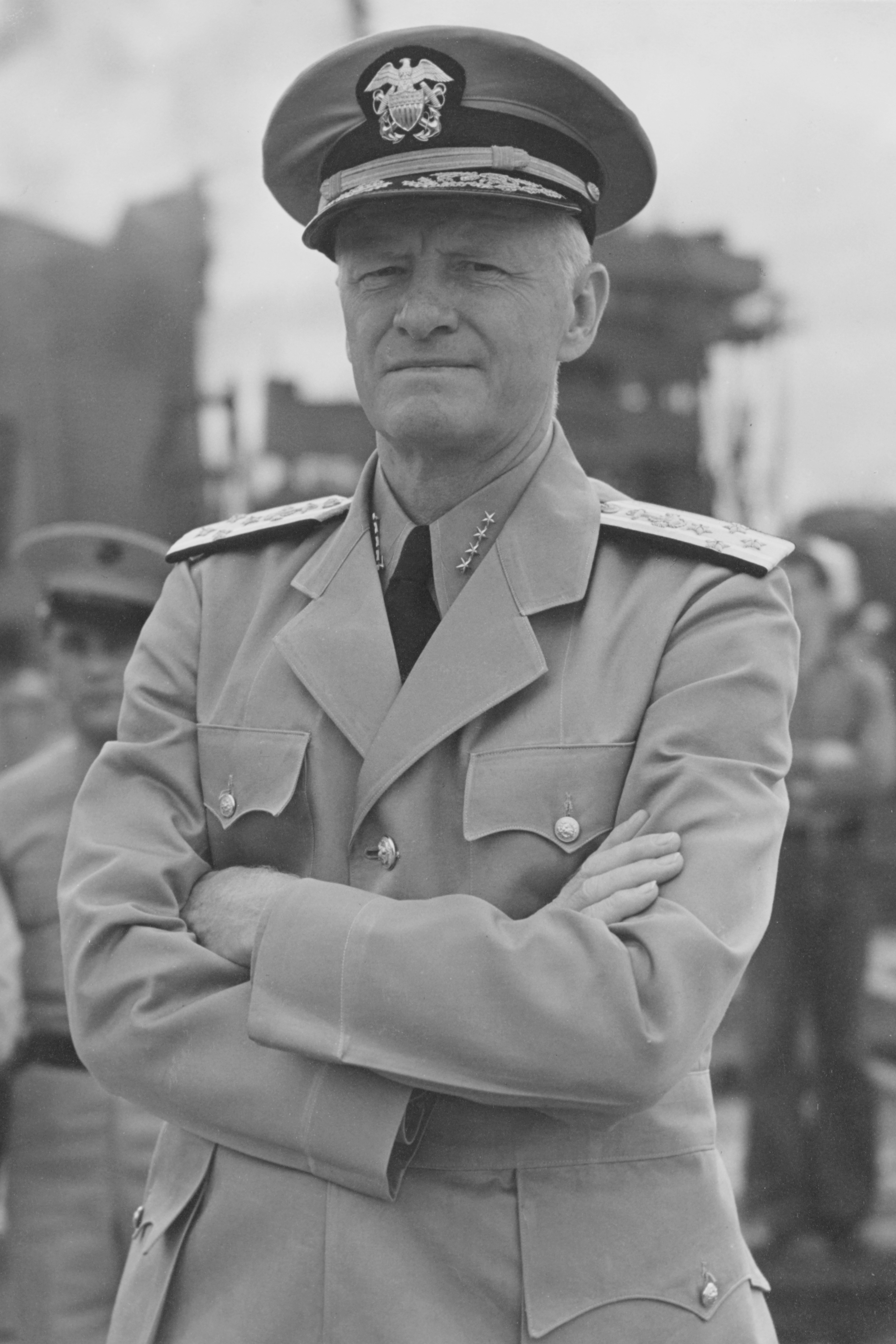
Adm. Chester W. Nimitz (HQ at Pearl Harbor)

This is the order of battle for the Battle of Midway, a major engagement of the Pacific Theatre of World War II, fought 4–7 June 1942 by naval and air forces of Imperial Japan and the United States in the waters around Midway Atoll in the far northwestern Hawaiian Islands.

The Japanese had two purposes for the campaign: to occupy Midway for use as a base for long-range search planes (for which the Americans were already using it), and to draw the US Pacific Fleet out of its base at Pearl Harbor for a decisive showdown battle.

Admiral Isoroku Yamamoto, commander of the Japanese Combined Fleet (comprising all combat vessels) and mastermind of the Pearl Harbor Attack, was tasked with drawing up the operational plan. The Japanese Naval General Staff, responsible for strategic planning, required him to include a diversionary move as part of his detailed battle plan; they told him to include a side operation that would result in the capture of two islands in the Aleutians chain, believing that the occupation of even a tiny portion of a US possession would be sufficient to draw out the bulk of the Pacific Fleet.

US Navy code-breaking, Japanese overconfidence and the courage of American carrier fliers combined to create both a strategic and a tactical defeat for the Japanese: they failed to capture Midway and they suffered much greater losses in ships and planes than did the Americans (the loss of experienced naval pilots would prove to be particularly costly as the war dragged on). Midway put an end to Japanese expansion in the Pacific.

Because the Japanese assumed the tactical initiative, their forces are listed first.

== Overview ==
Ships involved in the Midway operation
Losses indicated by *, counts in parentheses

=== Combat vessels ===
Imperial Japanese Navy		Ship Type	United States Navy	
Akagi * · Hiryū * · Kaga * · Sōryū *	4 (4)	Fleet carriers (CV)	3 (1)	Enterprise · Hornet · Yorktown *
Zuihō · Hōshō	2	Light carriers (CVL)	-	
Chitose · Kamikawa Maru · Chiyoda · Nisshin	4	Seaplane tenders (CVS/AVD)	2	Thornton · Ballard
Fusō · Haruna · Hiei · Hyūga · Ise · Kirishima · Kongō · Mutsu · Nagato · Yamashiro · Yamato	11	Battleships (BB)	-	
Atago · Chikuma · Chōkai · Haguro | Kumano · Mikuma * · Mogami · Myōkō · Nachi · Suzuya · Tone	11 (1)	Heavy cruisers (CA)	7	Astoria · Minneapolis · New Orleans · Northampton · Pensacola · Portland · Vincennes
Jintsu · Kitakami · Nagara · Ōi · Sendai · Yura	6	Light cruisers (CL)	1	Atlanta
Akigumo · Amagiri · Amatsukaze · Arare · Arashi · Arashio · Asagiri · Asashio · Asagumo · Ayanami · Fubuki · Hagikaze · Hamakaze · Harusame · Hatsukaze · Hatsuyuki · Hayashio · Isokaze · Isonami · Kagerō · Kasumi · Kazagumo · Kuroshio · Maikaze · Makigumo · Minegumo · Mikazuki · Murakumo · Murasame · Natsugumo · Nowaki · Oyashio · Samidare · Shikinami · Shiranui · Shirakumo · Shirayuki · Tanikaze · Tokitsukaze · Urakaze · Uranami · Yūdachi · Yūgiri · Yūgumo · Yūkaze · Yukikaze	46	Destroyers (DD)	20 (1)	Aylwin · Anderson · Balch · Benham · Blue · Clark · Conyngham · Dewey · Ellet · Gwin · Hammann * · Hughes · Maury · Monaghan · Monssen · Morris · Phelps · Russell · Ralph Talbot · Worden
I-9 · I-15 · I-17 · I-19 · I-25 · I-26 · I-121 · I-122 · I-123 · I-156 · I-157 · I-158 · I-159 · I-162 · I-164 · I-165 · I-166 · I-168 · I-169 · I-171 · I-174 · I-175	22	Submarines (SS)	19	Cachalot · Cuttlefish · Dolphin · Finback · Flying Fish · Gato · Grayling · Grenadier · Grouper · Growler · Gudgeon · Narwhal · Nautilus · Pike · Plunger · Tambor · Tarpon · Trigger · Trout

=== Auxiliaries ===
Imperial Japanese Navy		Ship Type	United States Navy	
Akebono · Fujisan · Genyo · Kenyo · Kokuyu · Kyokuto · Naruto · Nichiei · Nippon · Nissan Maru · San Clemente · Sata · Shinkoku · Toa Maru · Toei · Tōhō Maru · Tsurumi	17	AO	4	Cimarron · Guadalupe · Platte · Kaloli
No. 1 · No. 2 · No. 34 · No. 35	4	PT	16	PT-20 · PT-21 · PT-22 · PT-24 · PT-25 · PT-26 · PT-27 · PT-28 · PT-29 · PT-30 · PT-42 · Crystal · YP-284 · YP-290 · YP-345 · YP-350
Asaka Maru . Awata Maru	2	AMC	-	
Soya	1	AE	-	
Argentina Maru · Azuma Maru · Brazil Maru · Goshū Maru · Hakusan Maru · Hokuroku Maru · Kano Maru · Keiyo Maru · Kinugasa Maru · Kirishima Maru · Kiyosumi Maru · Kumagawa Maru · Meiyo Maru · Nankai Maru · Toa Maru No. 2 Go · Tōkō Maru No. 2 Go · Yamafuku Maru · Zenyo Maru	18	AP / AK	-	
Tama Maru No. 3 · Tama Maru No. 5 · Showa Maru No. 7 · Showa Maru No. 8 · Hakuhō Maru · Kaihō Maru · Shunkotsu Maru	7	AMS	-	
CH-16 · CH-17 · CH-18	3	SC	-	
Akashi	1	AR	-	
Magane Maru	1	ML	-	
	-	AT	1	Vireo

=== Aircraft ===
Imperial Japanese Navy	Aircraft Type	United States Navy
105 × Mitsubishi A6M "Zero"	Fighters	86 × Grumman F4F-4 "Wildcat"
97 × Aichi D3A "Val"	Dive bombers	131 × Douglas SBD-3 "Dauntless" 17 × Chance-Vought SB2U-3 "Vindicator" (USMC)
101 × Nakajima B5N "Kate"	Torpedo bombers	42 × Douglas TBD-1 "Devastator"; 6 × Grumman TBF "Avenger" (USMC)
	Level bombers	17 × Boeing B-17 "Flying Fortress" (USAAC); 4 × Martin B-26 "Marauder" (USAAC)
10 × Nakajima E8N2 Type 95 "Dave" float plane 6 × Aichi E13A1 Type 0 "Jake" float plane 2 × Yokosuka D4Y1 "Judy" dive bomber	Reconnaissance	31 × Consolidated PBY "Catalina"
(Due to production flaws early D4Y were unable to dive bomb and were used for reconnaissance)		(US Navy used carrier dive bombers for reconnaissance, reflected in the designation SB - scout-bomber)

== Japan ==
Admiral Isoroku Yamamoto (Note: Shot down and killed by US fighter planes while on tour of upper Solomons April 1943.)
Commander, Combined Fleet

Significant combat was experienced by Nagumo's First Striking Force and Kurita's Midway Support Force. The vast majority Japanese ships saw no action during the entire Midway campaign.

=== First Fleet (Main Force) ===
==== Main Force / 1st Fleet Main Body ====
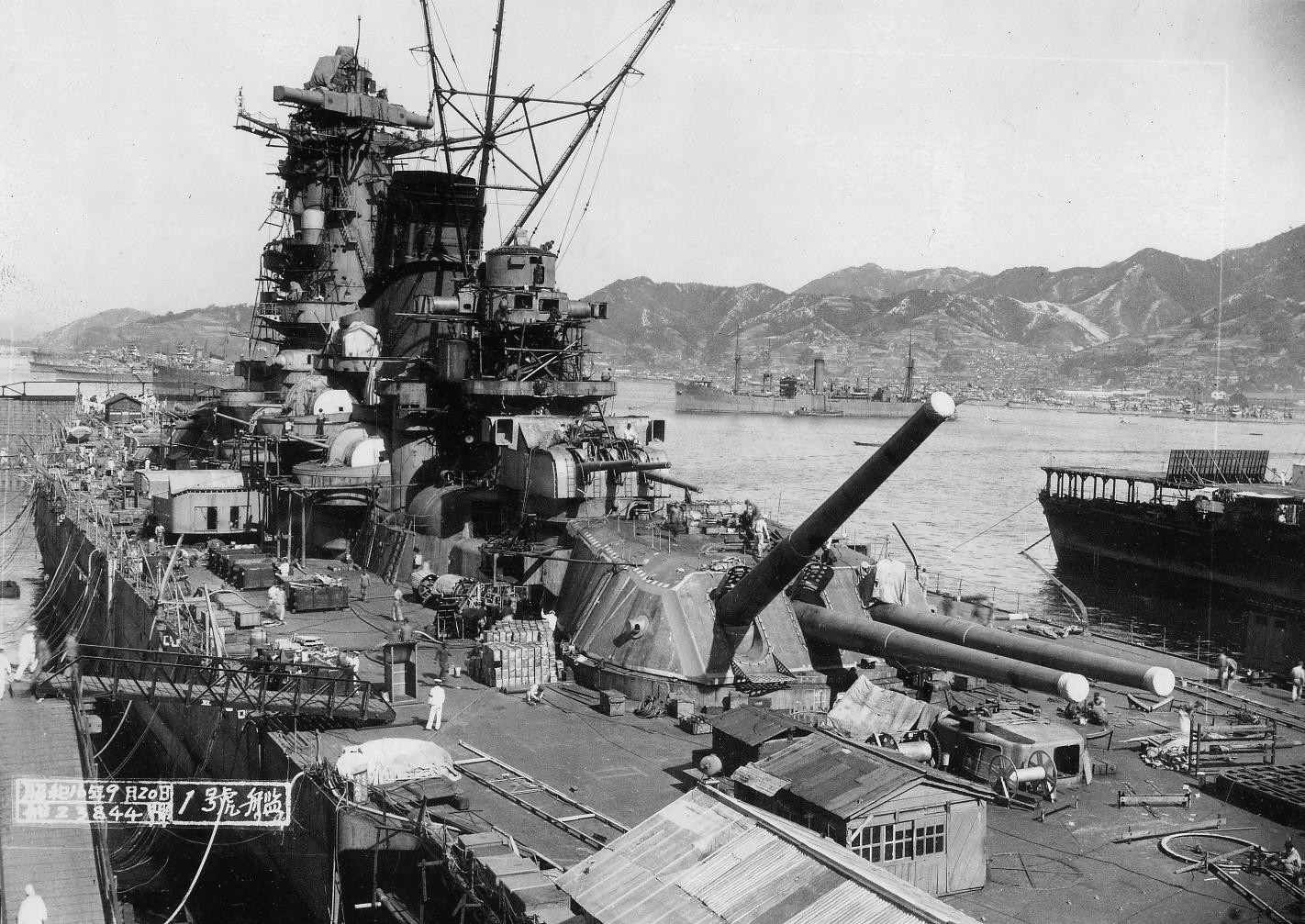
Super battleship Yamato fitting out several weeks before the attack on Pearl Harbor

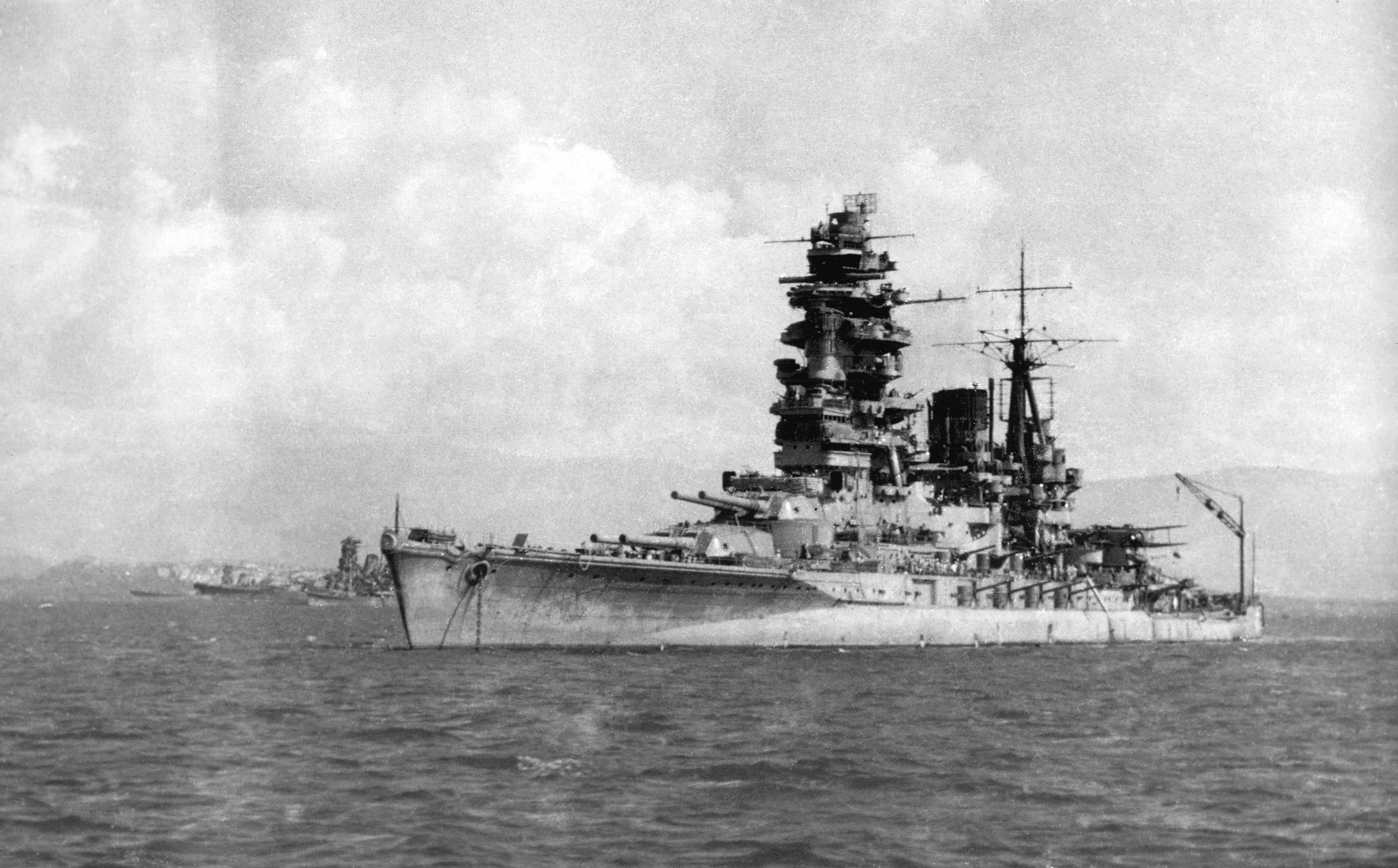
Battleship Nagato

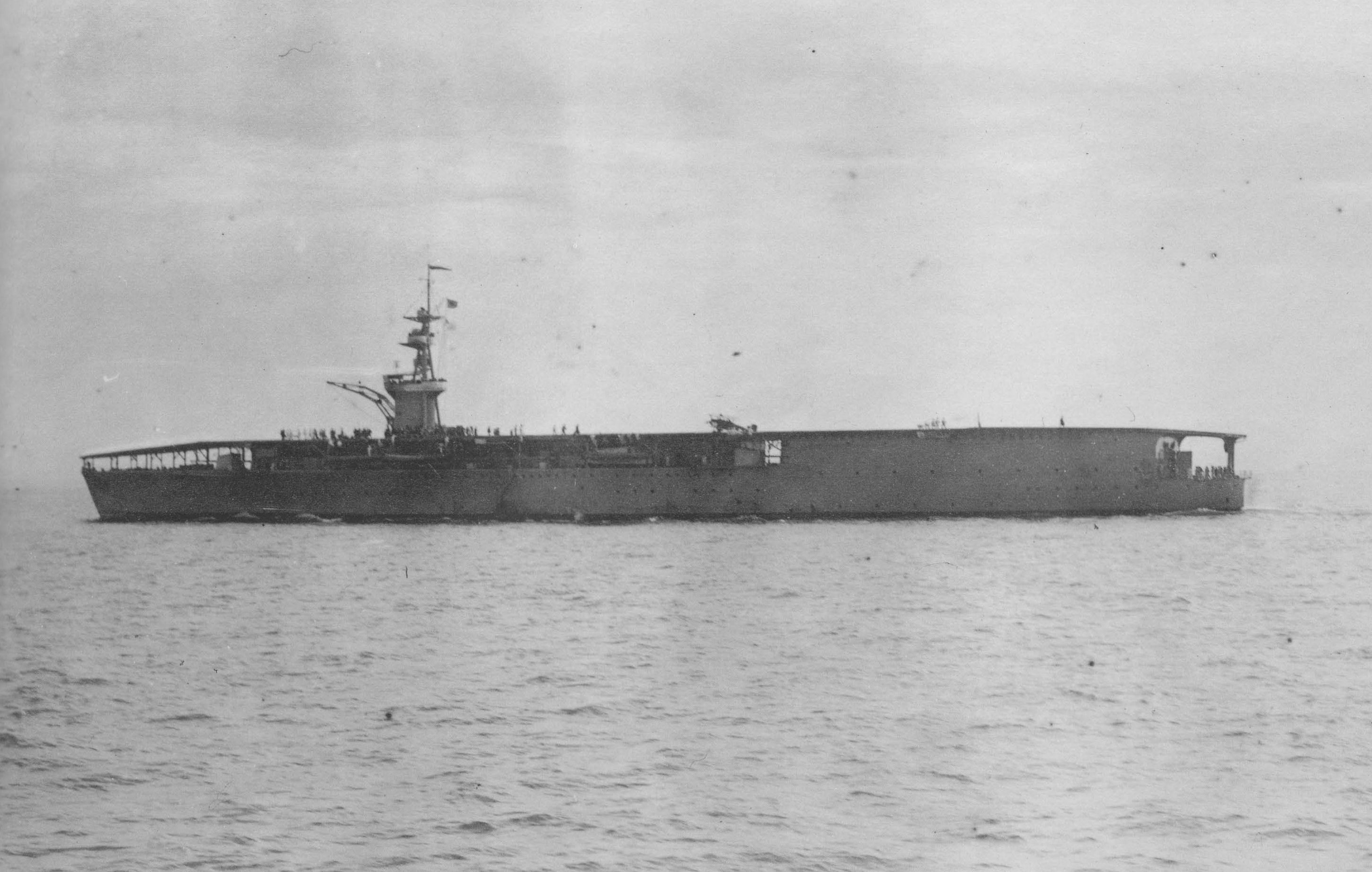
Light carrier Hosho

Admiral Yamamoto in Yamato

- 1st Battleship Division (Admiral Yamamoto)
  - 1 Yamato-class battleship (9 × 18-in. main battery)
    - Yamato (Rear Adm. Gihachi Takayanagi)
  - 2 Nagato-class battleships (8 × 16-in. main battery)
    - Mutsu (Rear Adm. Gunji Kogure)
    - Nagato (Captain Hideo Yano)
- Carrier Group:
  - CVL Hōshō (Capt. Kaoru Umetani)
    - Air Unit: 8 Yokosuka B4Y1 'Jean' biplane torpedo bombers (Lieutenant Yoshiaki Irikiin)
  - 1 Minekaze-class destroyer (4 × 4.7-in. main battery)
    - Yūkaze (Lt. Cmdr. Shizuka Kajimoto)
- Special Force
  - CVS Chiyoda (Capt. Kaku Harada)
  - CVS Nisshin (Capt. Katsumi Komazawa)
- Screening Force
  - 3rd Destroyer Squadron
  - Rear Admiral Shintaro Hashimoto (Note: Killed during Battle of the Malacca Strait May 1945) in Sendai
    - 1 Sendai-class cruiser (7 × 5.5-in. main battery)
      - Sendai (Capt. Nobue Morishita)
    - 11th Destroyer Division (Capt. Kichiro Shoji)
      - 4 Fubuki-class destroyers (6 × 5-in. main battery)
        - Fubuki (Lt. Cmdr. Shizuo Yamashita)
        - Shirayuki (Lt. Cmdr. Rokoro Sugawara)
        - Hatsuyuki (Lt. Cmdr. Junnari Kamiura)
        - Murakumo (Lt. Cmdr. Hideo Higashi)
    - 19th Destroyer Division (Capt. Ranji Oe)
      - 4 Fubuki-class destroyers (6 × 5-in. main battery)
        - Isonami (Cmdr. Ryokichi Sugama)
        - Uranami (Lt. Cmdr. Tsutomu Hagio)
        - Shikinami (Lt. Cmdr. Akifumi Kawahashi)
        - Ayanami (Cmdr. Eiji Sakuma)
- 1st Supply Group
- Captain Shigeyasu Nishioka in Naruto
  - AO Naruto (Capt. Nishioka)
  - AO Toei Maru

==== First Carrier Striking Force / 1st Air Fleet ====
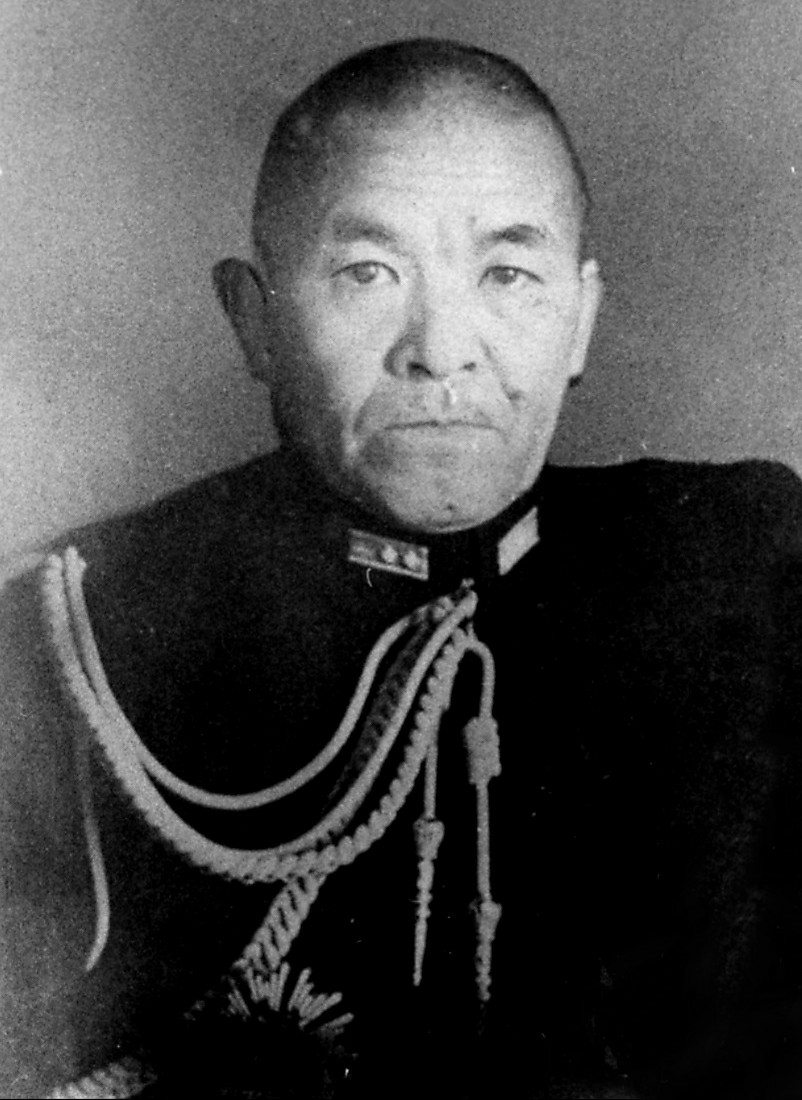
Chuichi Nagumo

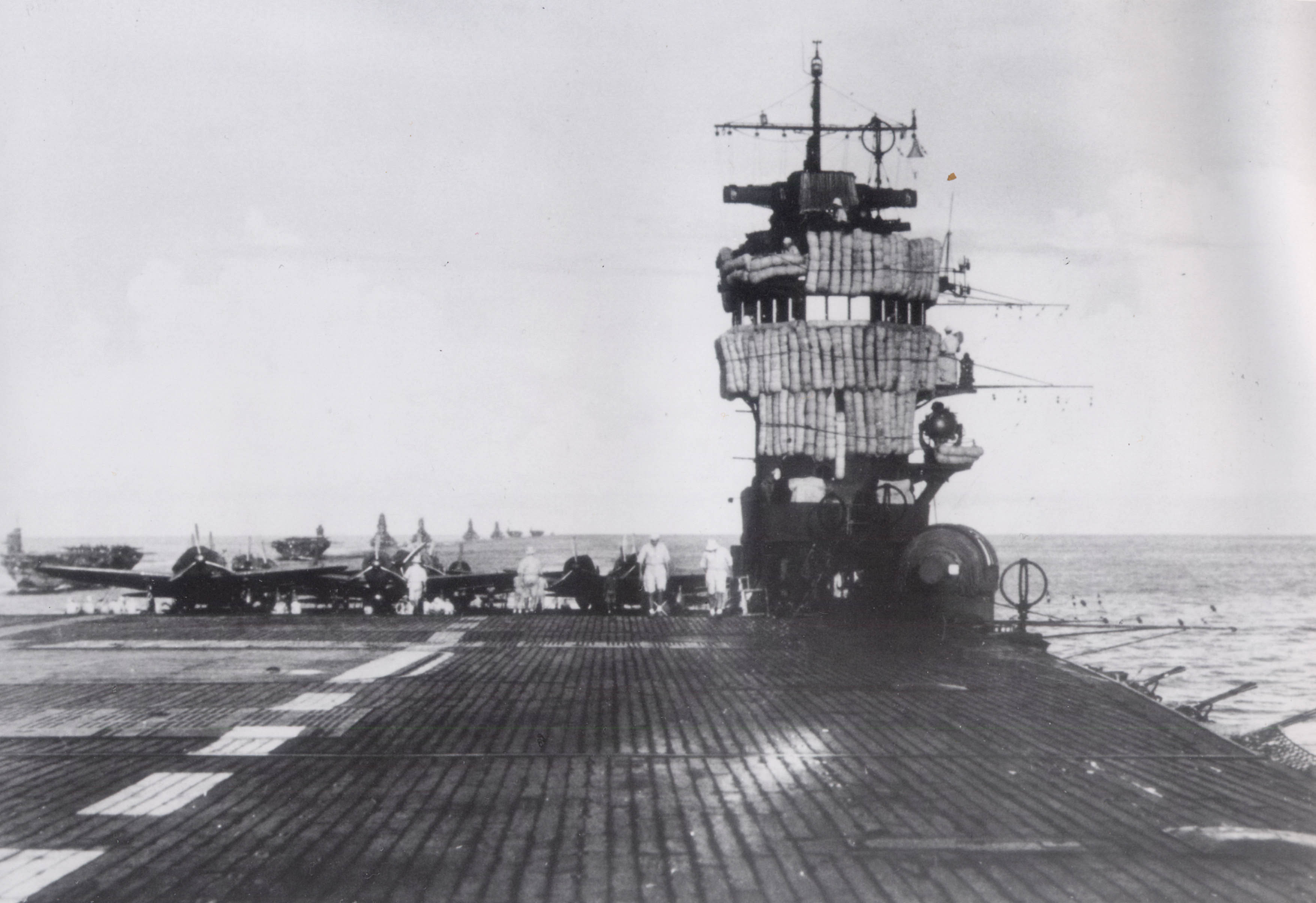
Deck scene on carrier Akagi in Indian Ocean

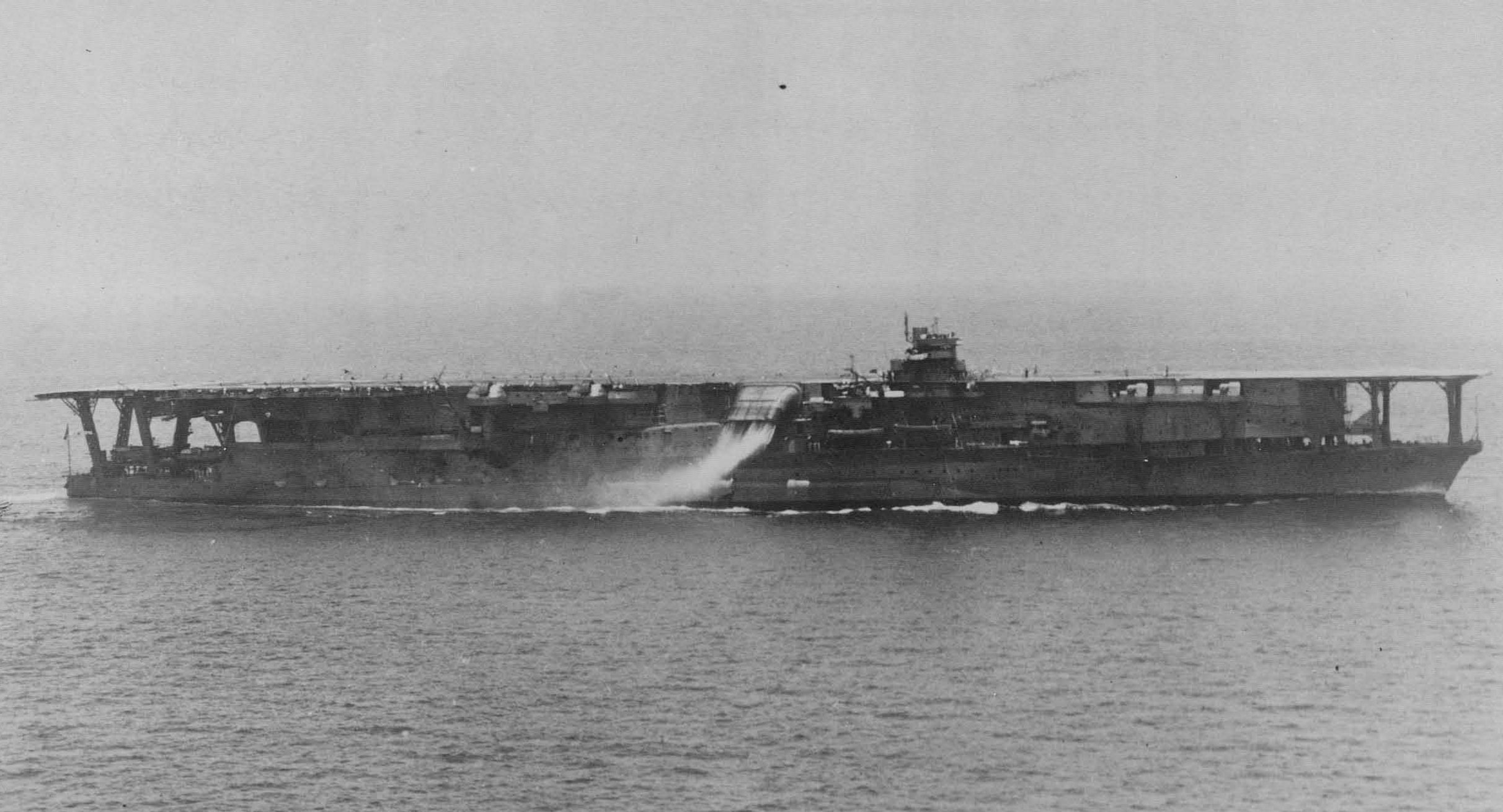
Carrier Kaga showing small superstructure and downward pointing funnel

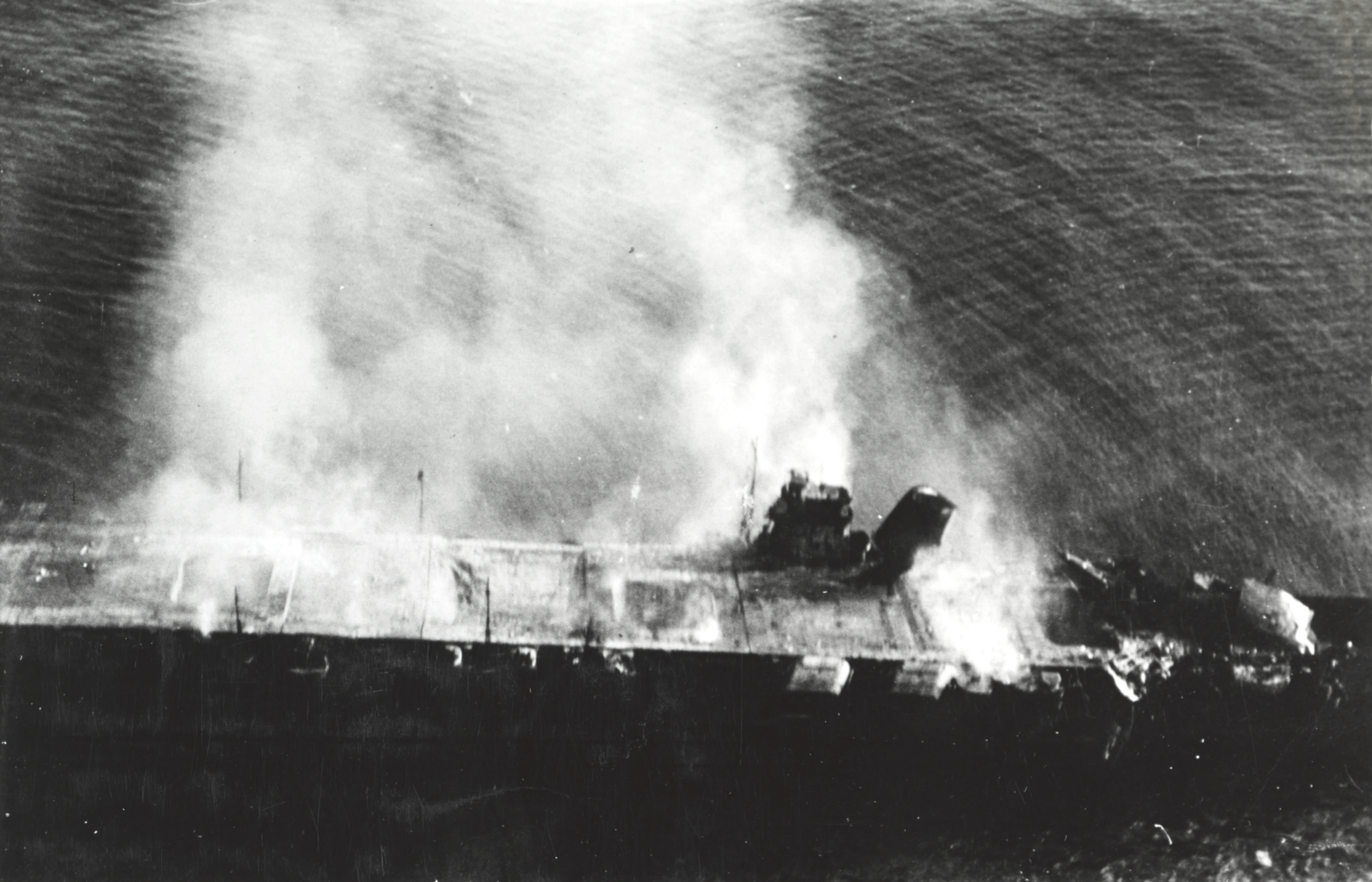
Carrier Hiryu on fire after US air attacks at Midway

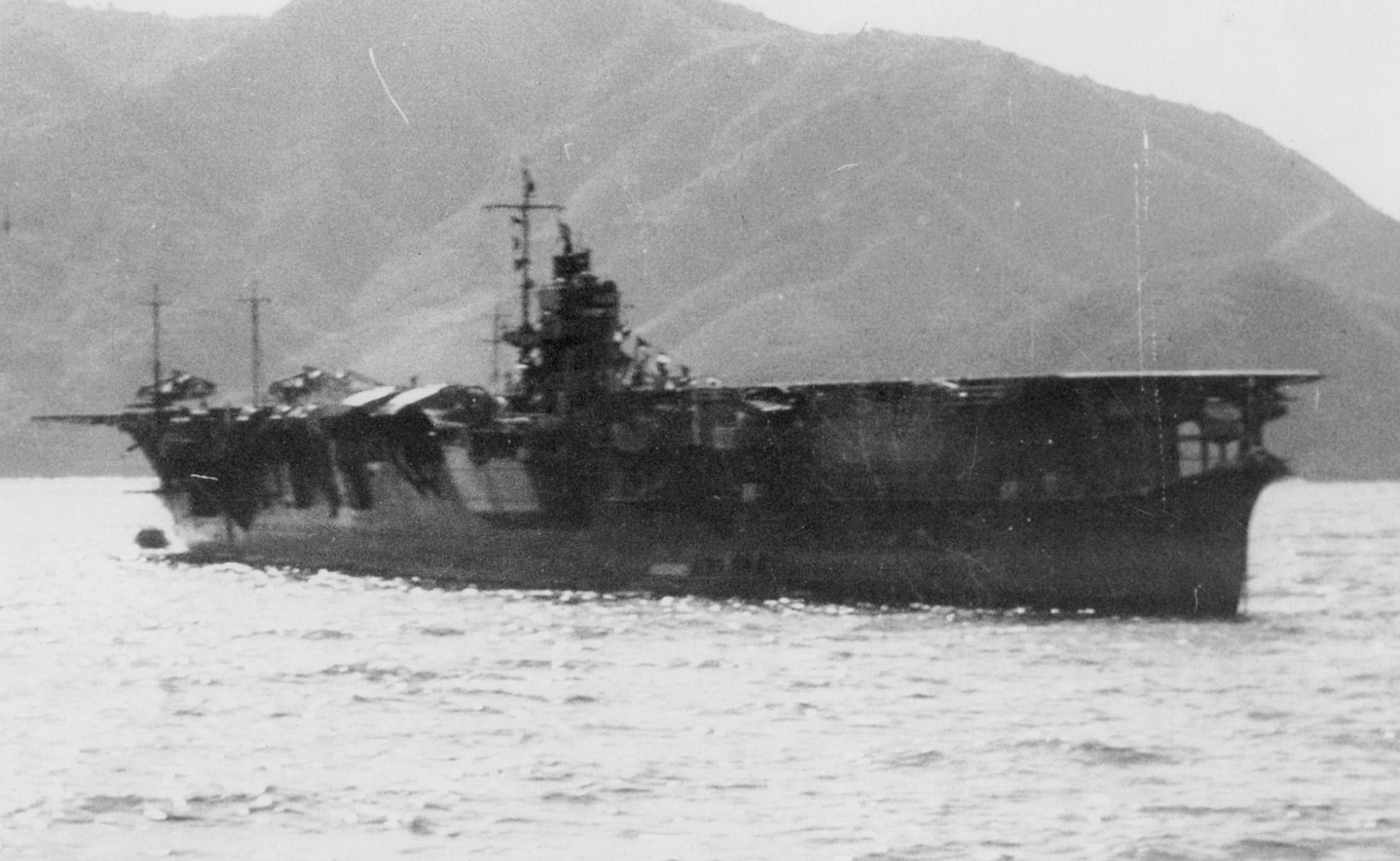
Carrier Soryu pre-war

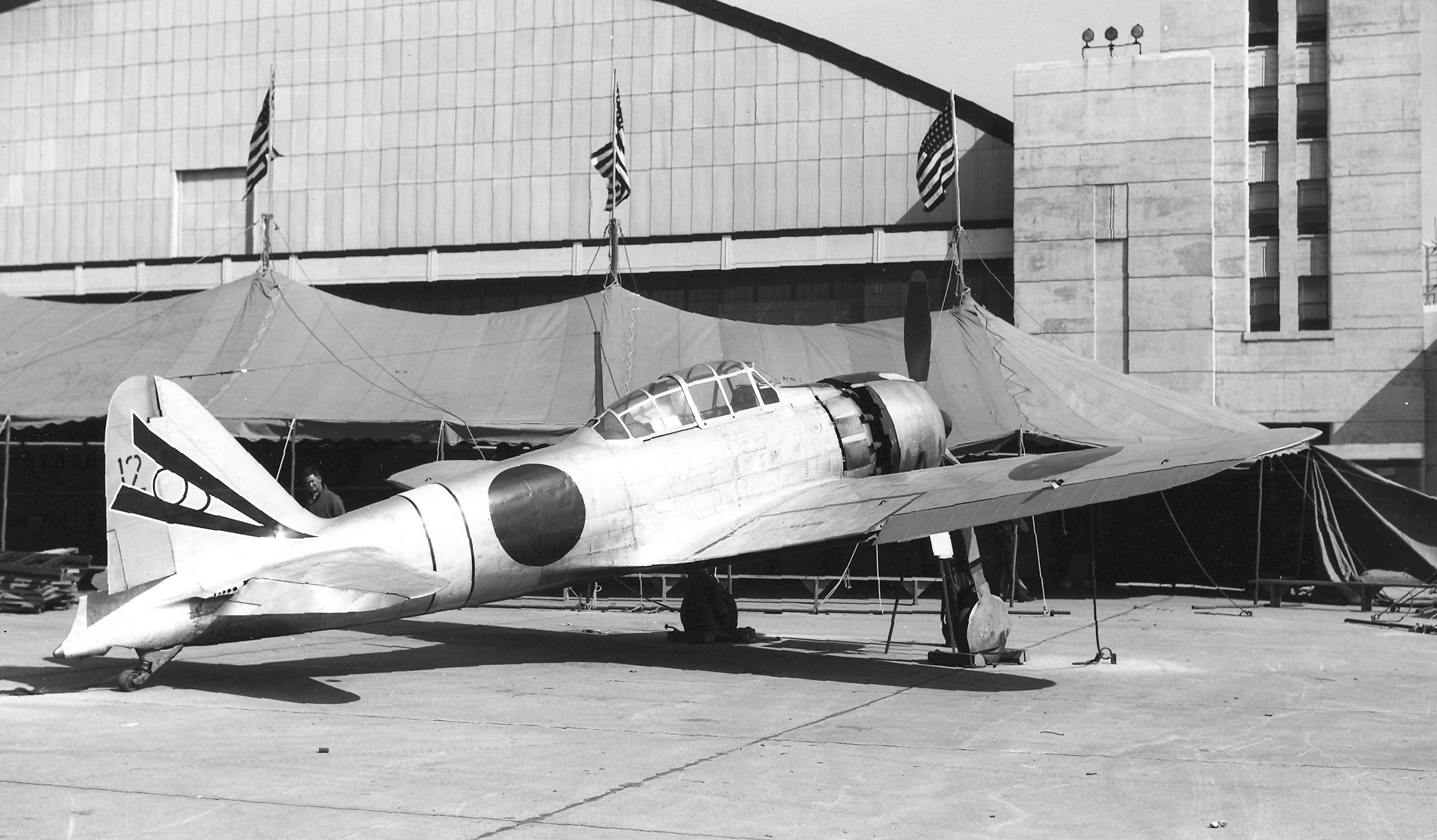
Mitsubishi A6M "Zeke" fighter

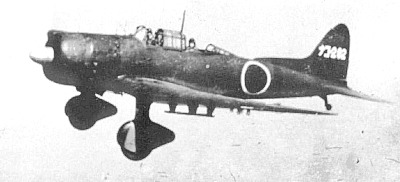
Aichi D3A "Val" dive bomber

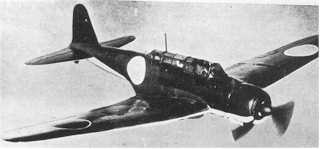
NakajimaB5N "Kate" torpedo bomber

Vice Admiral Chuichi Nagumo (Note: Died by self-inflicted gunshot on Saipan July 1944) in Akagi

- 1st Carrier Division
- Vice Admiral Nagumo
  - Akagi (scuttled 5 June) (Capt. Taijiro Aoki)
    - Air Unit (Commander Mitsuo Fuchida)
      - 24 Mitsubishi A6M2 Type 21 'Zeke' fighters (Lt. Cmdr. Shigeru Itaya)
      - 18 Aichi D3A1 'Val' dive bombers (Lt. Takehiko Chihaya)
      - 18 Nakajima B5N2 'Kate' torpedo bombers (Lt. Cmdr. Shigeharu Murata)
  - Kaga (sunk 4 June) (Capt. Jisaku Okada†)
    - Air Unit (Lt. Cmdr. Tadashi Kusumi†):
      - 18 Mitsubishi A6M2 Type 21 'Zeke' fighters (Lt. Masao Sato)
      - 18 Aichi D3A1 'Val' dive bombers (Lt. Shoichi Ogawa†)
      - 27 Nakajima B5N2 'Kate' torpedo bombers (Lt. Ichiro Kitajima)
- 2nd Carrier Division
- Rear Admiral Tamon Yamaguchi† in Hiryū
  - Hiryū (scuttled 5 June) (Capt. Tomeo Kaku†)
    - Air Unit (Lt. Joichi Tomonaga†)
      - 18 Mitsubishi A6M2 Type 21 'Zeke' fighters (Lt. Shigeru Mori†)
      - 18 Aichi D3A1 'Val' dive bombers (Lt. Michio Kobayashi†)
      - 18 Nakajima B5N2 'Kate' torpedo bombers (Lt. Rokuro Kikuchi†)
  - Sōryū (scuttled 4 June) (Capt. Ryusaku Yanagimoto†)
    - Air Unit (Lt. Cmdr. Takashige Egusa)
      - 18 Mitsubishi A6M2 Type 21 'Zeke' fighters (Lt. Masaji Suganami)
      - 16 Aichi D3A1 'Val' dive bombers (Lt. Masai Ikeda)
      - 18 Nakajima B5N2 'Kate' torpedo bombers (Lt. Heijiro Abe)
      - 2 Yokosuka D4Y1 'Judy' dive bombers
- Support Group
  - 8th Cruiser Division
  - Rear Admiral Hiroaki Abe (Note: Forced to resign from navy March 1943 following unsatisfactory performance at Naval Battle of Guadalcanal) in Tone
    - 2 Tone-class heavy cruisers (8 × 7.9-in. main battery)
      - Tone (Capt. Tametsugu Okada)
        - Air Unit: 3 Aichi E13A1 Type 0 'Jake' float planes, 2 Nakajima E8N2 Type 95 'Dave' float planes
      - Chikuma (Capt. Keizo Komura)
        - Air Unit: 3 Aichi E13A1 Type 0 'Jake' float planes, 2 Nakajima E8N2 Type 95 'Dave' float planes
  - 3rd Battleship Division, 2nd Section
  - Rear Admiral Tamotsu Takama in Haruna
    - 2 Kongo-class fast battleships (8 × 14-in. main battery)
      - Haruna (Rear Adm. Tamotsu Takama)
        - Air unit: 3 Nakajima E8N2 Type 95 'Dave' float planes
      - Kirishima (Capt. Sanji Iwabuchi)
        - Air unit: 3 Nakajima E8N2 Type 95 'Dave' float planes
- Screening Force
  - 10th Destroyer Squadron
  - Rear Admiral Susumu Kimura in Nagara
    - 1 Nagara-class light cruiser (7 × 5.5-in. main battery)
      - Nagara (Capt. Toshio Naoi)
    - 4th Destroyer Division (Capt. Kōsaku Aruga)
      - 4 Kagero-class destroyers (6 × 5-in. main battery)
        - Nowaki (Cmdr. Magataro Koga)
        - Arashi (Cmdr. Yusumasa Watanabe)
        - Hagikaze (Cmdr. Juichi Iwagami)
        - Maikaze (Cmdr. Seiji Nakasugi)
    - 10th Destroyer Division (Capt. Toshio Abe)
      - 3 Yugumo-class destroyers (6 × 5-in. main battery)
        - Kazagumo (Cmdr. Masayoshi Yoshida)
        - Yūgumo (Cmdr. Shigeo Semba)
        - Makigumo (Cmdr. Isamu Fujita)
    - 17th Destroyer Division (Capt. Masayuki Kitamura)
      - 4 Kagero-class destroyers (6 × 5-in. main battery)
        - Urakaze (Cmdr. Nagayoshi Shiraishi)
        - Isokaze (Cmdr. Shunichi Toyoshima)
        - Tanikaze (Cmdr. Motoi Katsumi)
        - Hamakaze (Cmdr. Tsuneo Orita)
- Supply Group 1
- Captain Masanao Ota in Kyokuto Maru
  - 1 Kagero-class destroyer (6 × 5-in. main battery)
    - Akigumo (Cmdr. Shohei Soma)
  - AO Kyokuto Maru (Capt. Ota)
  - AO Shinkoku Maru (Capt. Tokugyo Ito)
  - AO Tōhō Maru (Capt. Kazutaka Niimi)
  - AO Nippon Maru (Capt. Hironosuke Ueda)
  - AO Kokuyo Maru (Capt. Toraji Hidai)

=== Second Fleet (Midway Invasion Force) ===
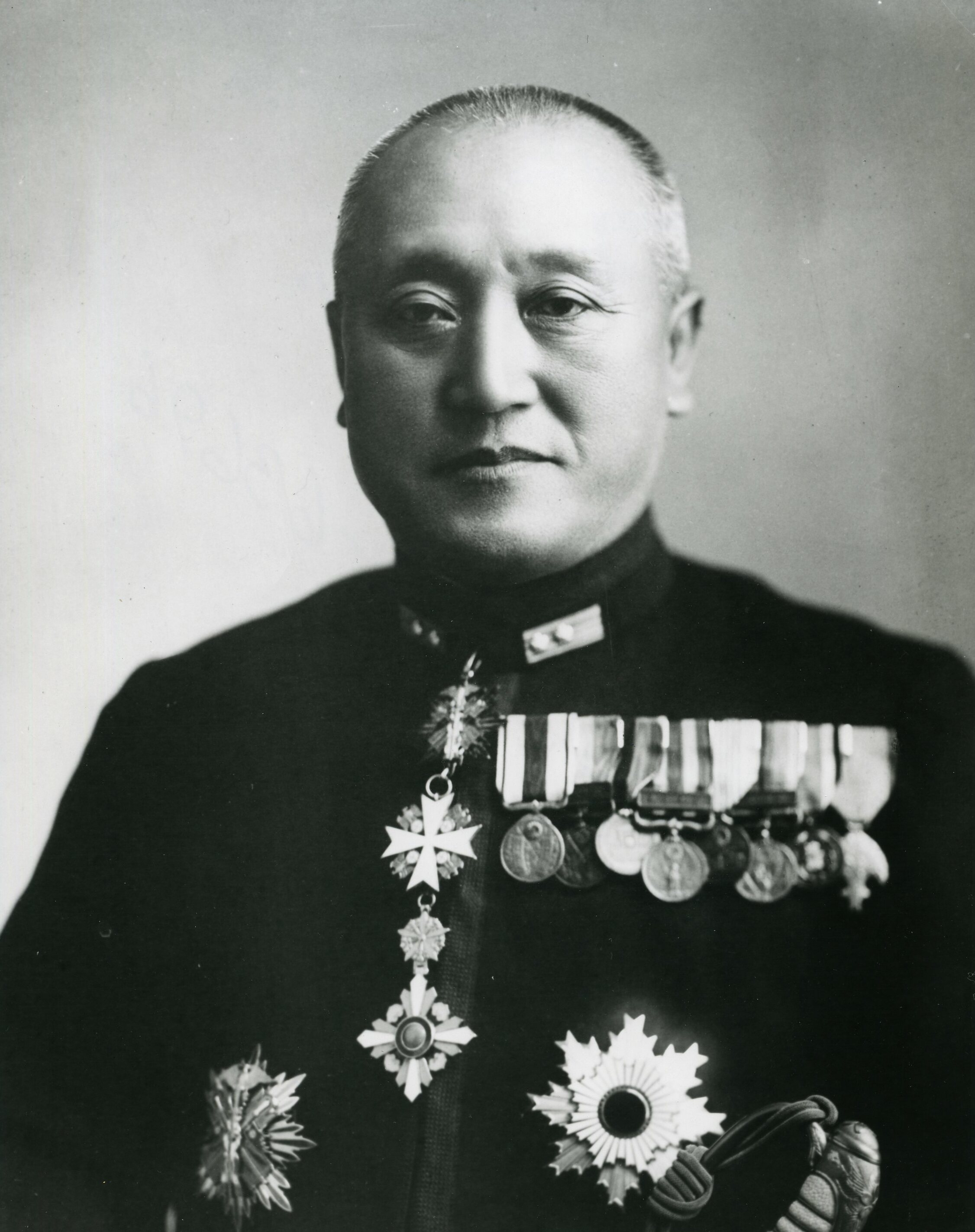
Nobutake Kondo

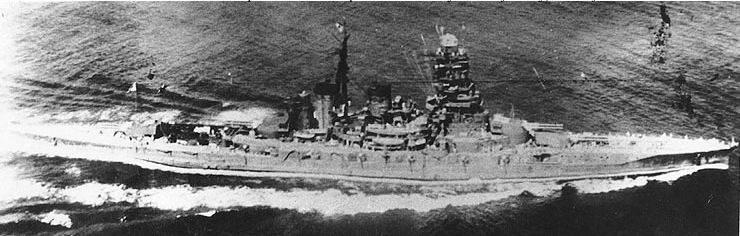
Battleship Hiei during war

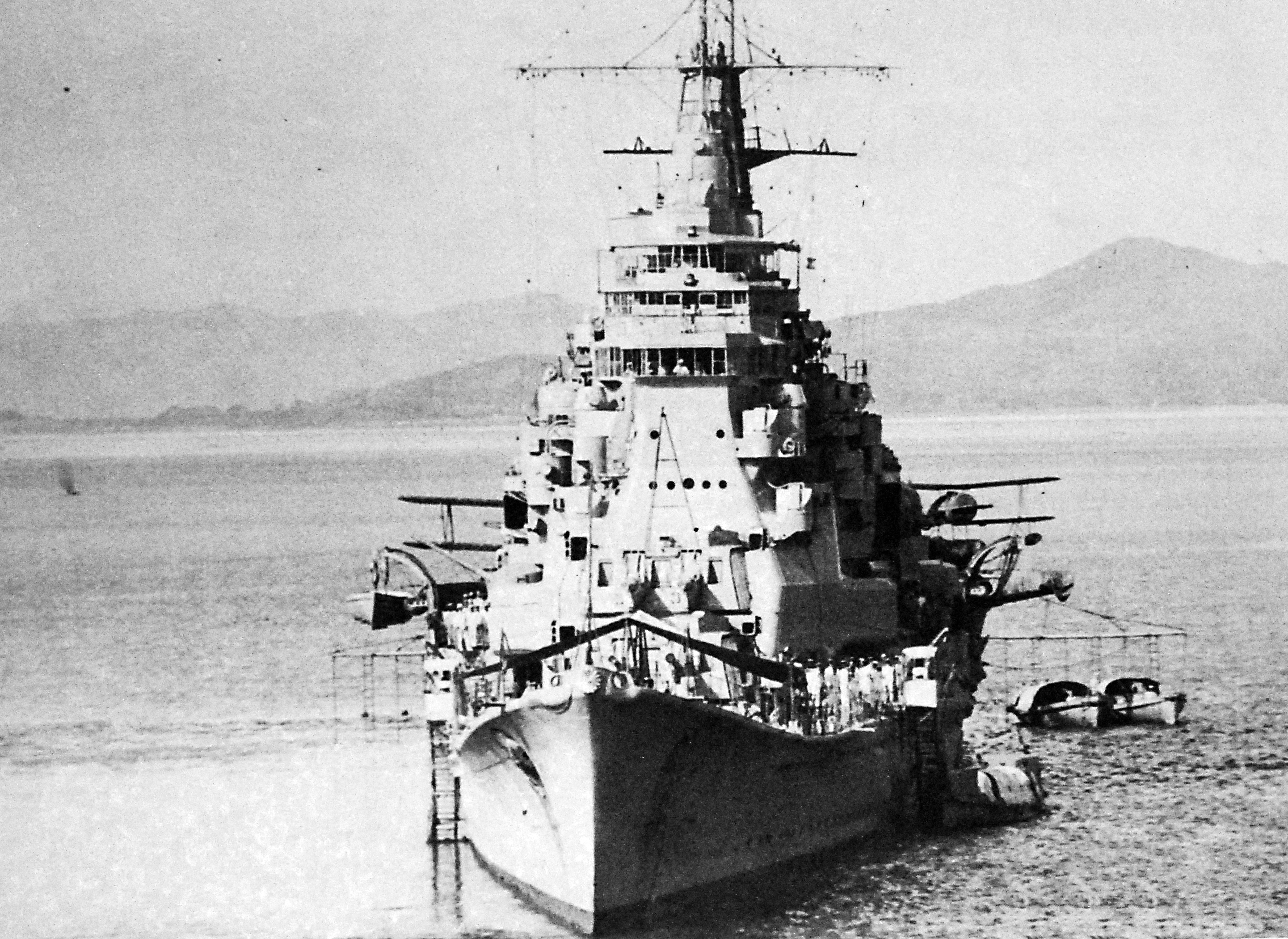
Atago-class heavy cruiser pre-war

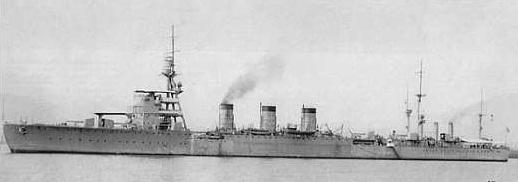
Nagara-class light cruiser pre-war

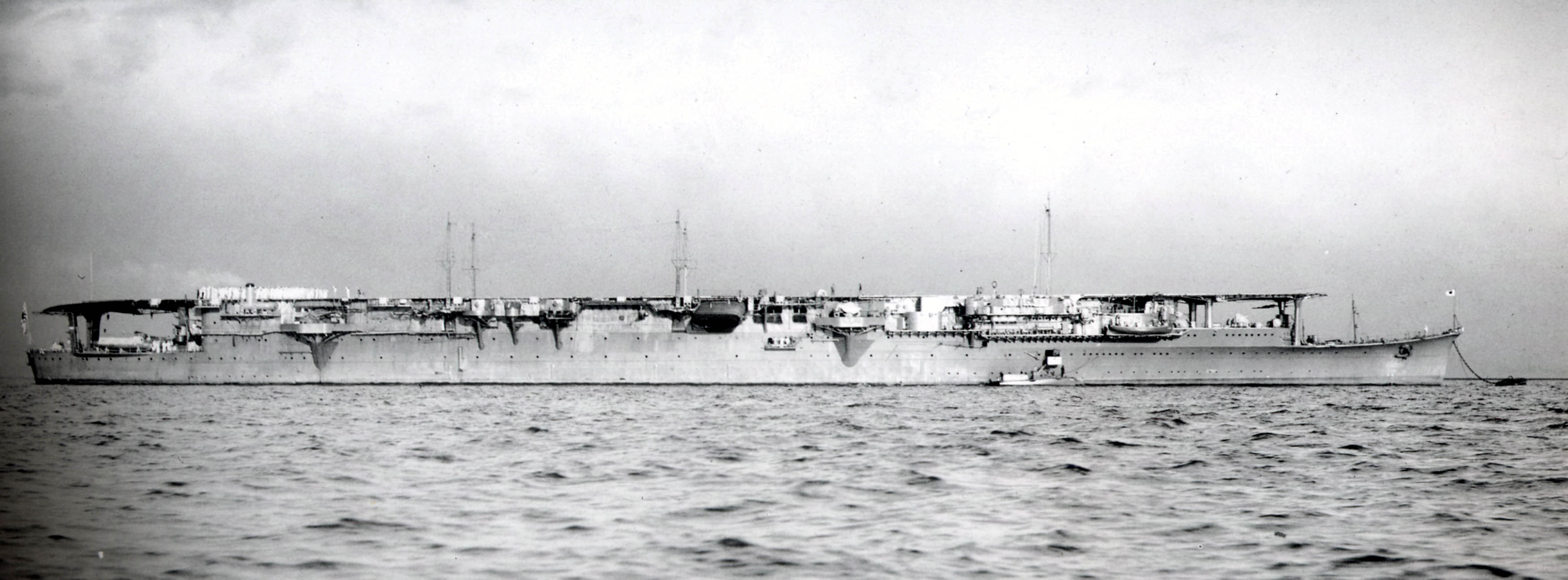
Light carrier Zuiho pre-war

==== 2nd Fleet Main Body ====
Vice Admiral Nobutake Kondō in Atago

- 3rd Battleship Division less 2nd Section
- Vice Admiral Gunichi Mikawa
  - 2 Kongo-class fast battleships (8 × 14-in. main battery)
    - Kongō (Capt. Tomiji Koyanagi)
    - Hiei (Capt. Masao Nishida)
- 4th Cruiser Division less 2nd Section
- Vice Admiral Kondo
  - 2 Takao-class heavy cruisers (10 × 7.9-in. main battery)
    - Atago (Capt. Baron Matsuji Ijuin)
    - Chōkai (Capt. Mikio Hayakawa)
- 5th Cruiser Division
- Vice Admiral Takeo Takagi (Note: Died during Battle of Saipan July 1944)
  - 2 Myōkō-class heavy cruisers (10 × 7.9-in. main battery)
    - Myōkō (Capt. Teruhiko Miyoshi)
    - Haguro (Capt. Tomokazu Mori)
- Screening Force
  - 4th Destroyer Squadron
  - Rear Admiral Shoji Nishimura (Note: Killed during Battle of Surigao Strait October 1944) in Yura
    - 1 Nagara-class light cruiser (7 × 5.5-in. main battery)
      - Yura (Capt. Shiro Sato)
    - 3rd Destroyer Division (Capt. Ranji Oe)
      - 4 Shiratsuyu-class destroyers
        - Murasame (Lt. Cmdr. Naoji Suenaga)
        - Samidare (Cmdr. Takisaburo Matsubara)
        - Harusame (Lt. Cmdr. Masao Kamiyama)
        - Yūdachi (Cmdr. Kiyoshi Kamiyama)
    - 9th Destroyer Division (Capt. Yasuo Sato)
      - 3 Asashio-class destroyers
        - Asagumo (Cmdr. Toru Iwahashi)
        - Minegumo (Lt. Cmdr. Yasuatsu Suzuki)
        - Natsugumo (Lt. Cmdr. Moritaro Tsukamoto)
- Carrier Group
- Captain Sueo Obayashi
  - CVL Zuihō (Capt. Obayashi)
    - 12 Mitsubishi A6M2 Type 21 'Zeke' fighters (Lt. Saneyasu Hidaka)
    - 12 Nakajima B5N2 'Kate' torpedo bombers (Lt. Kaji Matsuo)
  - 1 Mutsuki-class destroyer (4 × 4.7-in. main battery)
    - Mikazuki (Lt. Cmdr. Saneho Maeda)
- Supply Group
- Captain Jiro Murao in Sata
  - AO Sata (Capt. Murao)
  - AO Tsurumi (Capt. Toshizo Fujita)
  - AO Genyo Maru (Capt. Shigetaro Ogawa)
  - AO Kenyo Maru (Capt. Yoshio Kanemasu)
  - AR Akashi (Capt. Tsunekichi Fukuzawa)

=== Midway Occupation Force ===
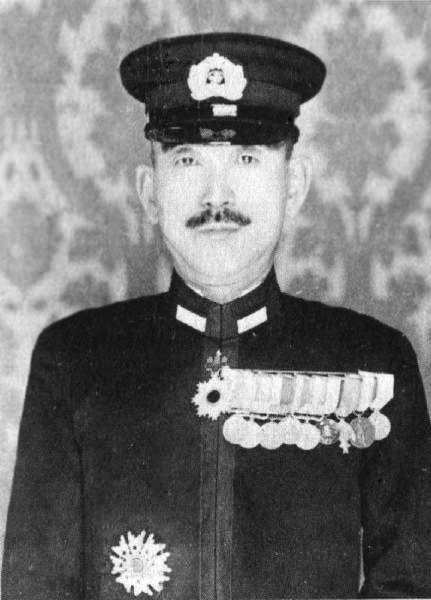
Raizo Tanaka

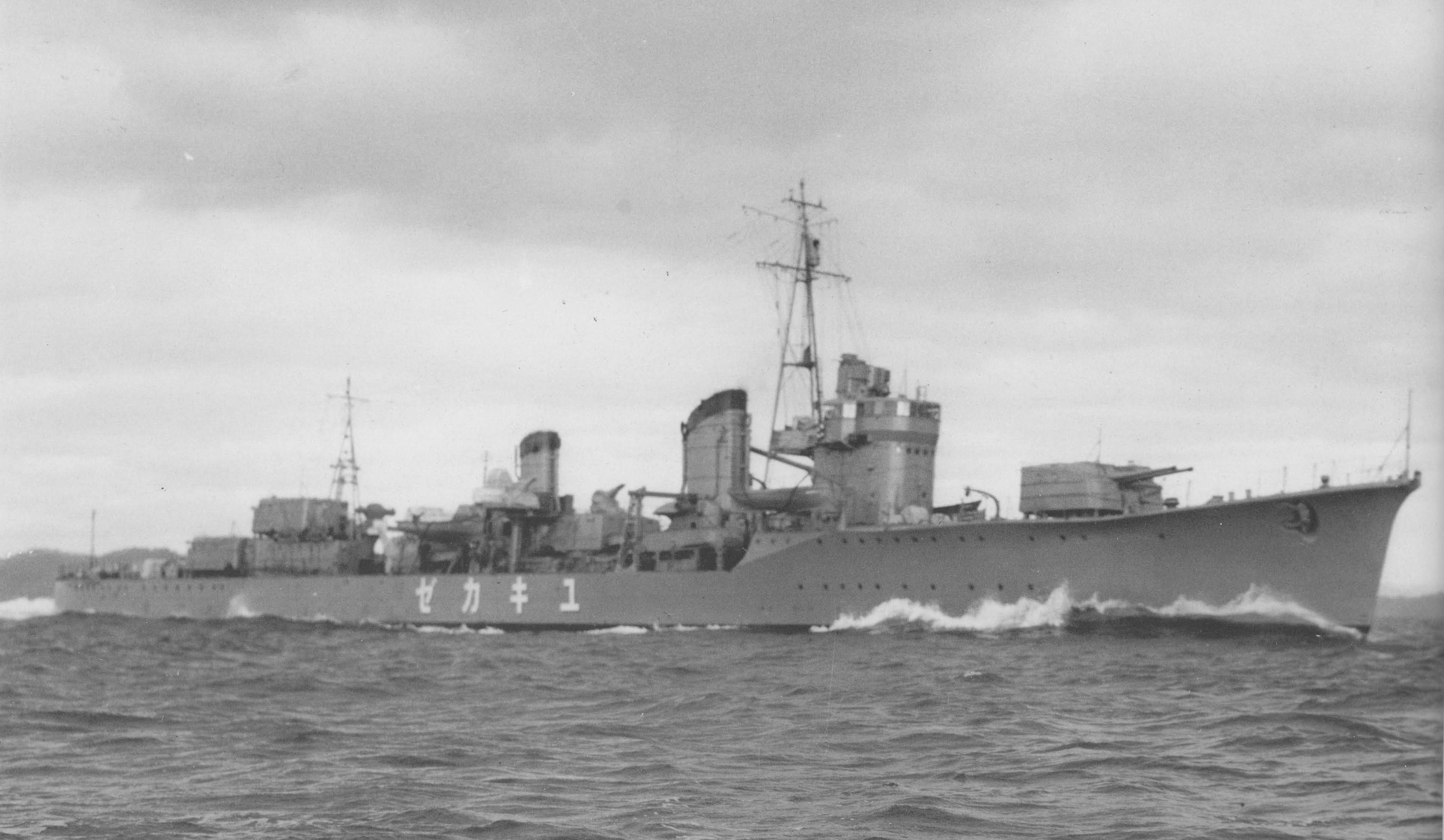
Kagero-class destroyer

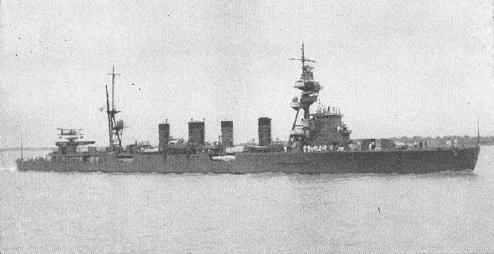
Light cruiser Sendai

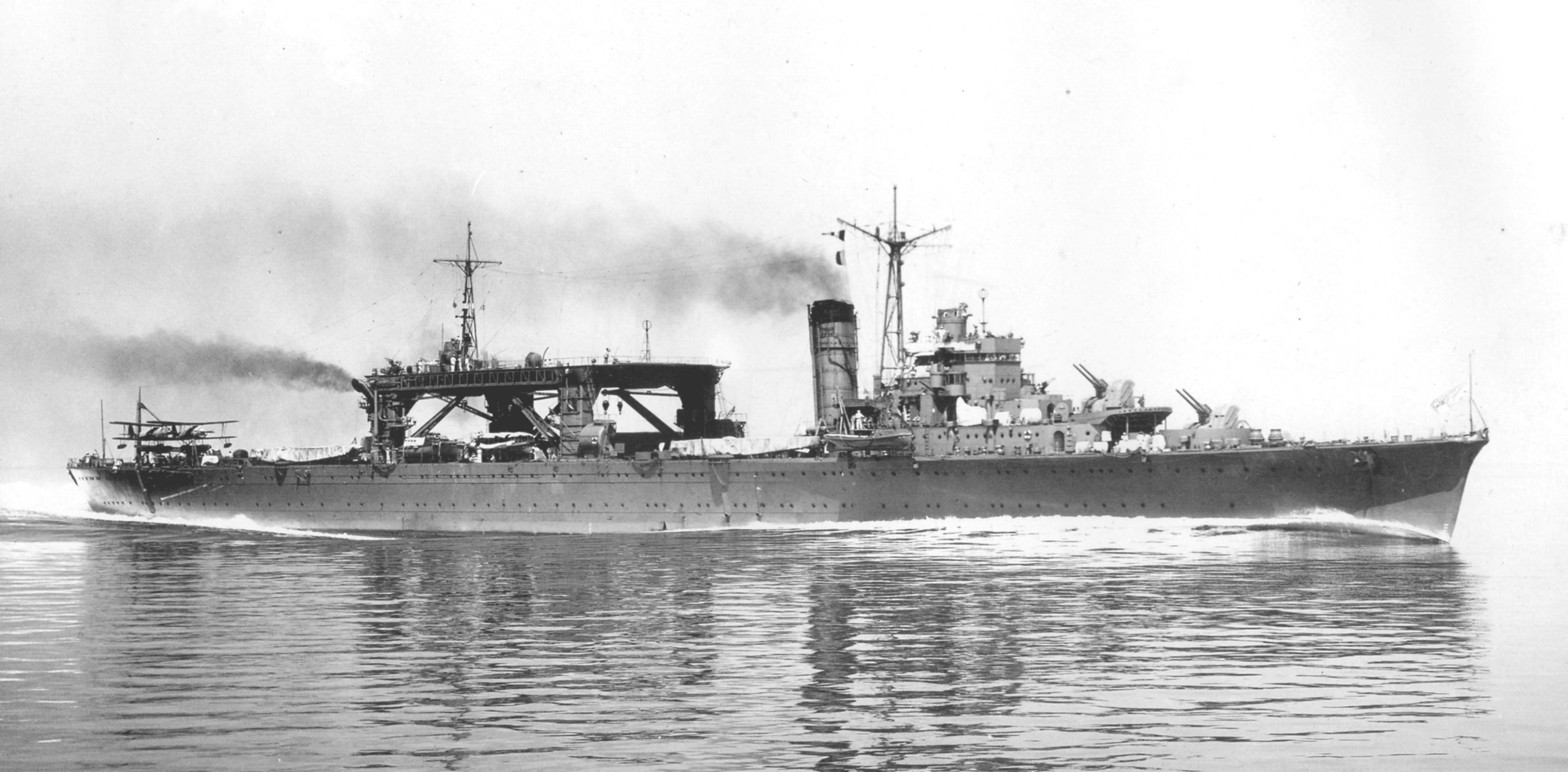
Seaplane tender Chitose

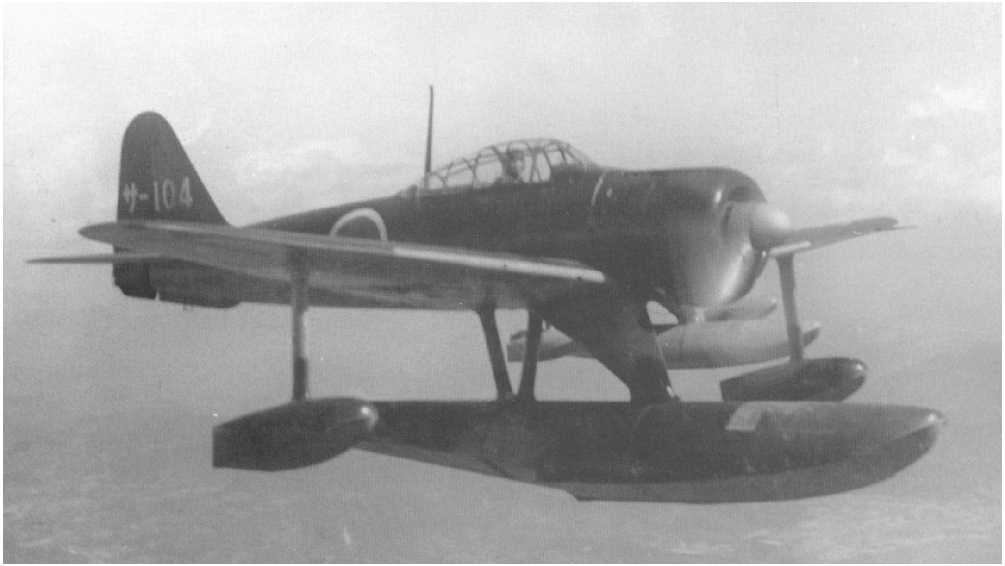
A6M "Rufe" floatplane fighter

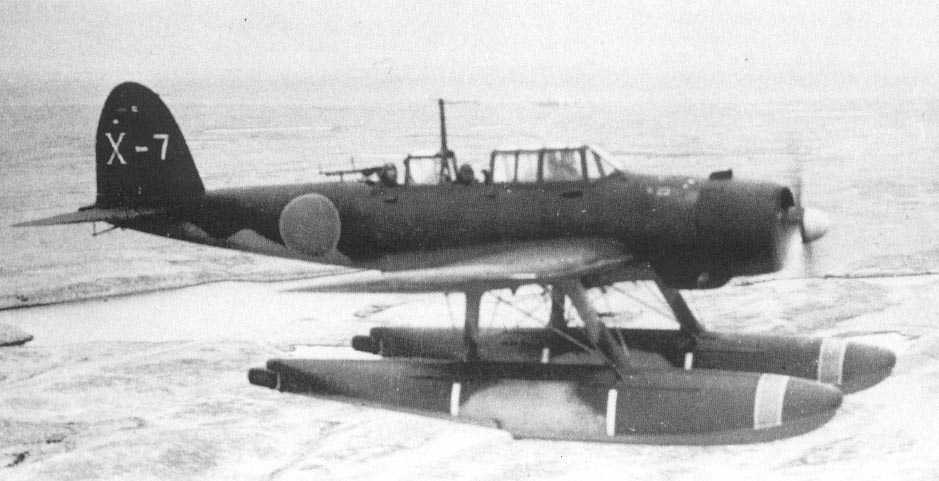
Aichi E13 "Jake" scout plane

Rear Admiral Raizo Tanaka (Note: Fell out of favor with Naval high command after the Guadalcanal campaign and was assigned to shore duty from December 1942 until end of war.) in Jintsu

- Transport Group carrying about 5000 troops under Captain Minoru Ōta, (Note: Died by self-inflicted gunshot on Okinawa June 1945) IJN and Colonel Kiyonao Ichiki, (Note: Killed on Guadalcanal August 1942) IJA
  - Transports
    - Kiyosumi Maru (Capt. Seiichiro Kito)
    - Keiyo Maru (Capt. Masamichi Ikeuchi)
    - Zenyo Maru
    - Goshū Maru (Capt. Hiyoshi Furuya)
    - Toa Maru No. 2 Go
    - Kano Maru (Capt. Tomosaburo Miura)
    - Argentina Maru (Cmdr. Takeshi Watanabe)
    - Hokuroku Maru (Capt. Hiotaro Tsukagoshi)
    - Brazil Maru (Capt. Kyujiro Jintsu)
    - Kirishima Maru (Capt. Hiroshi Okubo)
    - Azuma Maru (Capt. Nobuyoshi Morikawa)
    - Nankai Maru (Capt. Akira Maki)
  - Patrol Boats
    - Patrol Boat #1
    - Patrol Boat #2
    - Patrol Boat #34 also carrying SNLF detachment
  - AO Akebono Maru (damaged by torpedo night of June 3–4) (Capt. Miki Otsuka)
- Escort Force
  - 2nd Destroyer Squadron
  - Rear Admiral Tanaka
  - 1 Sendai-class cruiser (7 × 5.5-in. main battery)
    - CL Jintsu (Capt. Torazo Kozai)
  - 15th Destroyer Division (Capt. Torajiro Sato)
    - 2 Kagero-class destroyers
      - Kuroshio (Cmdr. Tamaki Ugaki)
      - Oyashio (Cmdr. Tokiyoshi Arima)
  - 16th Destroyer Division (Capt. Shiro Shibuya)
    - 4 Kagero-class destroyers
      - Yukikaze (Cmdr. Kenjiro Tobita)
      - Amatsukaze (Cmdr. Tameichi Hara)
      - Tokitsukaze (Cmdr. Giichiro Nakahara)
      - Hatsukaze (Cmdr. Kameshiro Takahashi)
  - 18th Destroyer Division (Capt. Yoshito Miyasaka)
    - 2 Kagero-class destroyers
      - Shiranui (Cmdr. Shizuo Akazawa)
      - Kagerō (Cmdr. Minoru Yokoi)
    - 2 Asashio-class destroyers
      - Kasumi (Cmdr. Kiyoshi Tomura)
      - Arare (Cmdr. Tomoe Ogata)
- Seaplane Tender Group
- Rear Admiral Ruitaro Fujita in Chitose
  - 11th Seaplane Tender Division
    - CVS Chitose (Capt. Tamotsu Furukawa)
      - 16 Nakajima A6M2-N 'Rufe' floatplane fighters
      - 4 Aichi E13A 'Jake' scout floatplanes
    - AV Kamikawa Maru (Capt. Tarohachi Shinoda)
      - 8 Nakajima A6M2-N 'Rufe' floatplane fighters
      - 4 Aichi E13A 'Jake' scout floatplanes
  - 1 Kagero-class destroyer
    - Hayashio (Cmdr. Kiyoshi Kaneda)
  - Patrol Boat #35 (carrying troops)

=== Midway Support Force ===
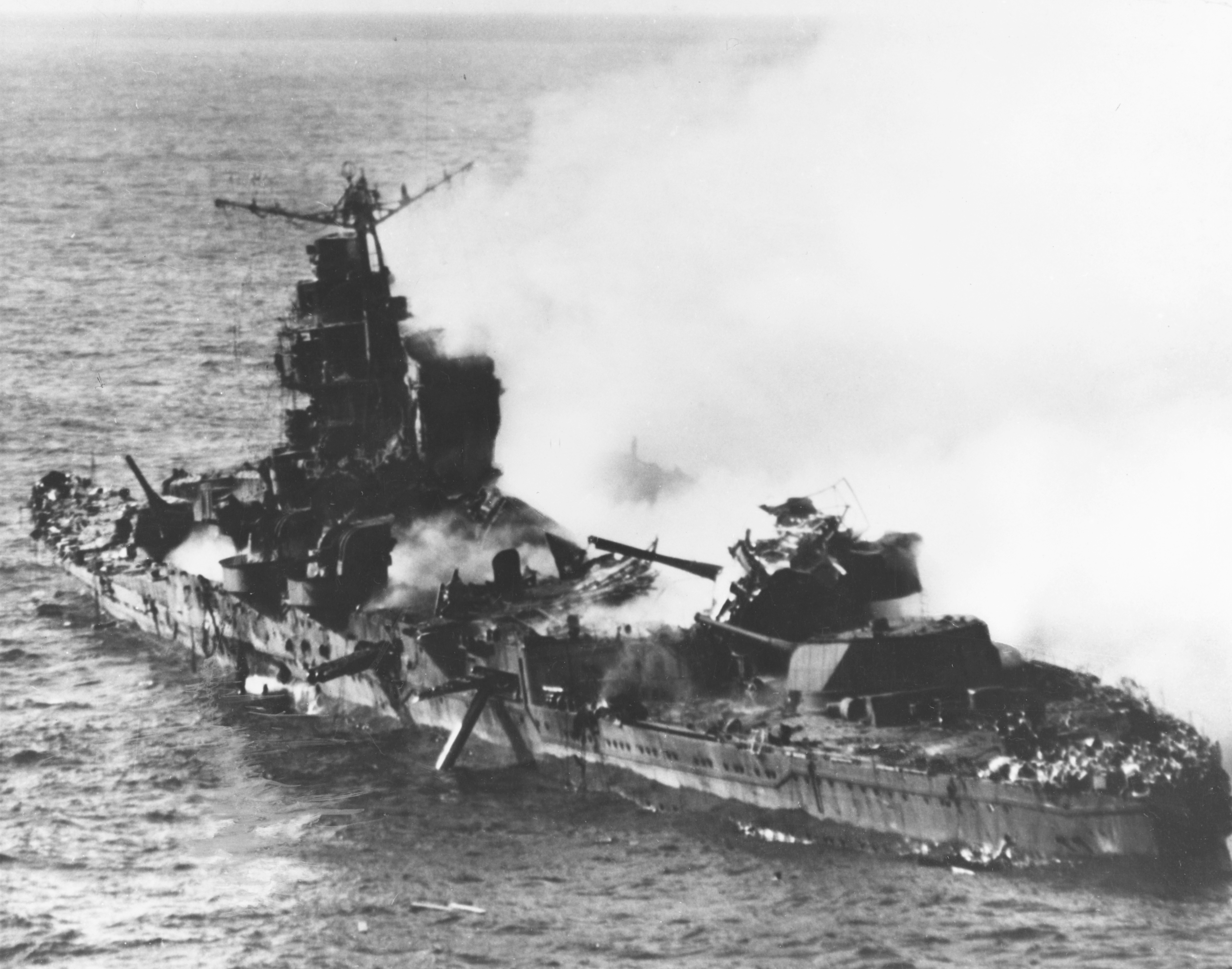
Heavy cruiser Mikuma heavily damaged by US air attack at Midway

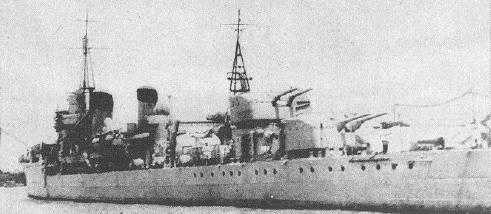
Destroyer Asashio

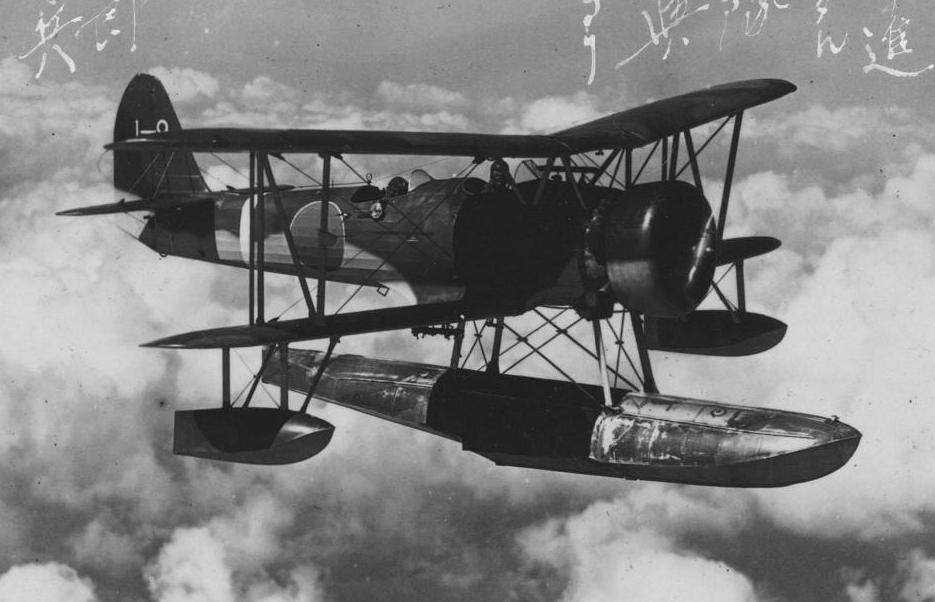
Nakajima E8N "Dave" scout plane

Vice Admiral Takeo Kurita in Kumano

- 7th Cruiser Division (Vice Adm. Kurita)
  - Kumano (Capt. Kikumatsu Tanaka)
  - Suzuya (Capt. Masatomi Kimura)
  - Mikuma (sank 6 June) (Capt. Shakao Sakiyama†)
  - Mogami (Capt. Akira Soji)
- 8th Destroyer Division (Cmdr. Nobuki Ogawa)
  - 2 Asashio-class destroyers
    - Asashio (Lt. Cmdr. Goro Yoshii)
    - Arashio (Cmdr. Hideo Kuboki)
- Attached Oiler
  - AO Nichiei Maru (Capt. Matsushi Yamamoto)
- Minesweeper Group
- Captain Sadatomo Miyamoto
  - 4 auxiliary minesweepers
    - Tama Maru #3 (Lt. (j.g.) Atsutoshi Yamaguchi)
    - Tama Maru #5 (Lt. Akira Takato)
    - Showa Maru #7 (Lt. Teruhisa Takahashi)
    - Showa Maru #8 (Lt. (j.g.) Kiichi Sasaki)
  - 3 subchasers
    - Subchaser #16 (Lt. Yasukichi Suzuki)
    - Subchaser #17 (Lt. Shigematsu Yoshioka)
    - Subchaser #18 (Lt. Mitsugu Miyoi)
- 1 supply ship
  - Soya (Cmdr. Toshi Kubota)
- 2 cargo ships
  - Meiyo Maru (Capt. Hisao Koizumi)
  - Yamafuku Maru (Capt. Torao Honda)

=== Advance (Submarine) Force (Sixth Fleet) ===
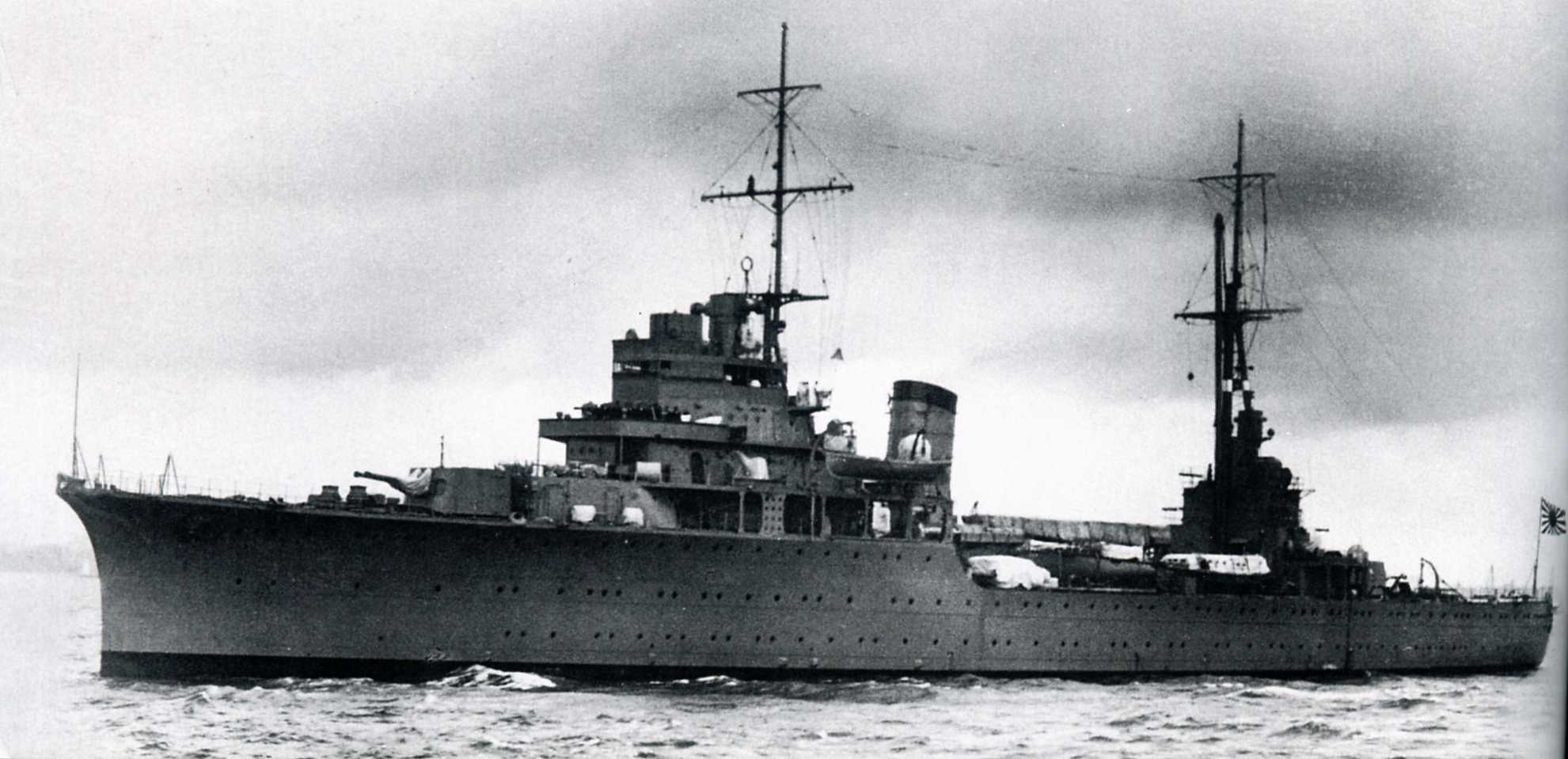
Light cruiser Katori pre-war

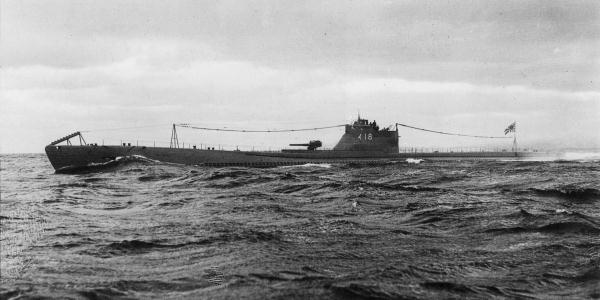
I-class submarine underway

Vice Admiral Teruhisa Komatsu in Katori at Kwajalein

- 1 Katori-class cruiser (4 × 5.5-in. main battery)
  - Katori (Capt. Noboru Owada)
- 3rd Submarine Squadron
- Rear Admiral Chimaki Kono in Rio de Janeiro Maru at Kwajalein
  - 19th Submarine Division (Capt. Ryojiro Ono)
    - I-156 (Lt. Cmdr. Katsuo Ohashi)
    - I-157 (Lt. Cmdr. Sakae Nakajima)
    - I-158 (Lt. Cmdr. Soshichi Kitamura)
    - I-159 (Lt. Cmdr. Tamori Yoshimatsu)
  - 13th Submarine Division (Capt. Takeji Miyazaki)
    - I-121 (Lt. Cmdr. Yasuo Fujimori)
    - I-122 (Lt. Cmdr. Sadatoshi Norita)
    - I-123 (Lt. Cmdr. Toshitake Ueno)
  - 30th Submarine Division (Capt. Maseo Teraoka)
    - I-162 (Lt. Cmdr. Takakazu Kinashi)
    - I-165 (Lt. Cmdr. Hakue Jarada)
    - I-166 (Lt. Cmdr. Makio Tanaka)

== Shore-based Air Force ==
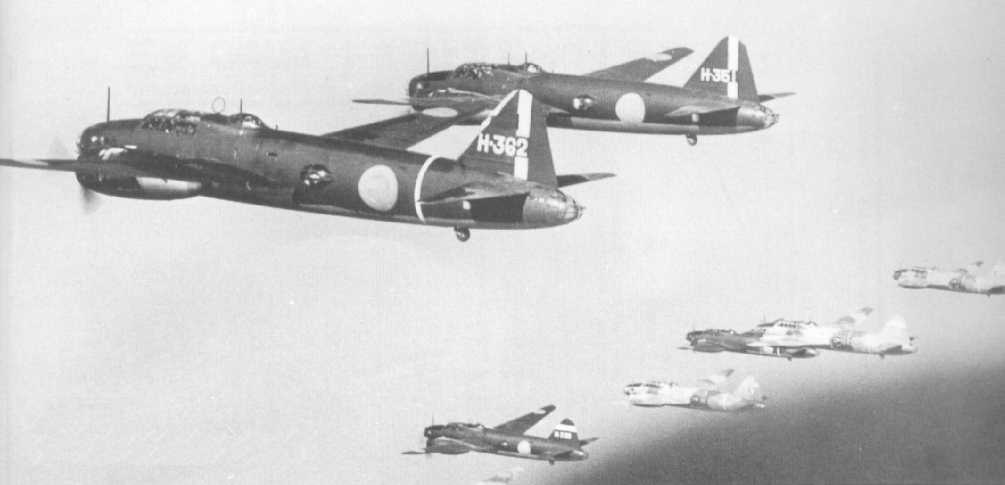
Mitsubishi G4M "Betty" level bombers

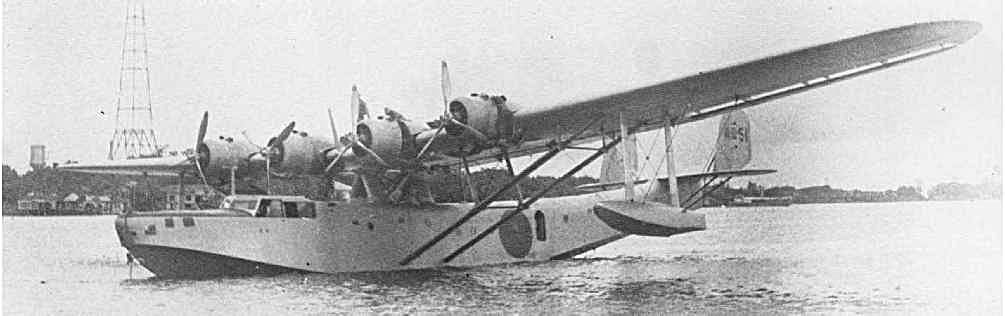
Kawanishi H6K "Mavis" flying boat

Eleventh Air Fleet
Vice Admiral Nishizo Tsukahara at Tinian

- Midway Expeditionary Force (Capt. Chisato Morita)
  - 36 Mitsubishi A6M Zero fighters (Lt. Tadashi Kaneko)
  - 10 Mitsubishi G4M 'Betty' level bombers at Wake Island
  - 6 flying boats at Jaluit
- 24th Air Flotilla (Rear Adm. Minoru Maeda)
  - Chitose Air Group at Kwajalein (Capt. Fujiro Ohashi)
    - 36 Mitsubishi A6M Zero fighters
    - 36 Nakajima B5N2 'Kate' torpedo bombers
  - 1st Air Group at Aur and Wotje (Capt. Samaji Inoue)
    - 36 Mitsubishi A6M Zero fighters
    - 36 Nakajima B5N2 'Kate' torpedo bombers
  - 14th Air Group (Capt. Daizo Nakajima)
    - 36 Kawanishi H6K 'Mavis' flying boats at Jaluit and Wotje

== Fifth Fleet (Northern Area Force) ==
=== 5th Fleet Main Body ===
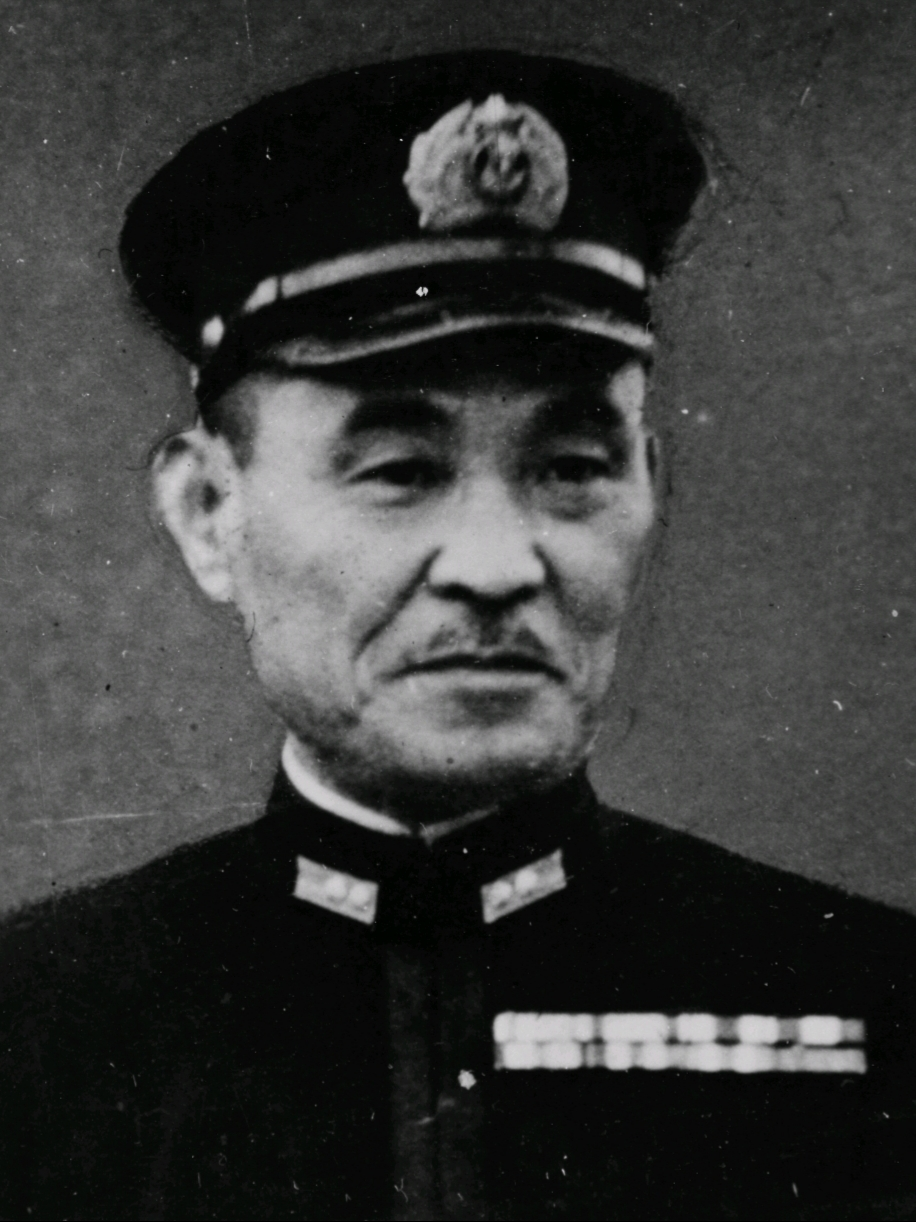
Boshirō Hosogaya

Vice Admiral Boshirō Hosogaya (Note: Assigned to shore duty following unsatisfactory performance in Battle of the Komandorski Islands) in Nachi

- 1 Myoko-class heavy cruiser
  - Nachi (Capt. Takahiko Kiyota)
- 2 Akatsuki-class destroyers
  - Inazuma (Lt. Cmdr. Hajime Takeuchi)
  - Ikazuchi (Lt. Cmdr. Shunsaku Kudo)
- Supply Group:
  - AO Fujisan Maru (Capt. Kikuta Maki)
  - AO Nissan Maru (Capt. Hachiro Naotsuka)
  - AC Muroto (Capt. Masaji Yamagata)
  - AP Akashisan Maru (Capt. Yoshio Hosoya)
  - AF Tōkō Maru No. 2 Go

=== Second Carrier Striking Force ===
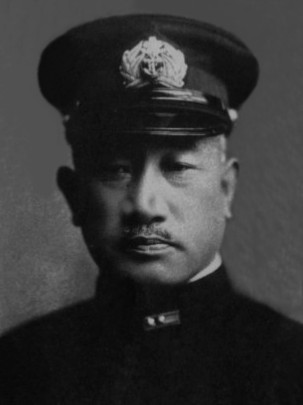
Kakuji Kakuta

Rear Admiral Kakuji Kakuta (Note: Died on Tinian prob. by suicide August 1944) in Ryujo

- 4th Carrier Division (Rear Adm. Kakuta)
  - CVL Ryūjō (Capt. Tadeo Kato)
    - Air Unit (Lt. Masayuki Yamagami)
      - 16 Mitsubishi A6M2 Type 21 'Zeke' fighters (Lt. Minoru Kobayashi)
      - 21 Nakajima B5N2 'Kate' torpedo bombers (Lt. Yamagami)
  - CV Jun'yō (Capt. Shizue Isii)
    - Air Unit (Lt. Yoshio Shiga)
      - 24 Mitsubishi A6M Zero Type 21 'Zeke' fighters (Lt. Shiga)
      - 15 Aichi D3A1 'Val' dive bombers (Lt. Zenji Abe)
- 4th Cruiser Division, 2nd Section (Capt. Shunsaku Nabeshima in Maya)
  - 2 Takao-class heavy cruisers
    - Takao (Capt. Bunji Asakura)
    - Maya (Capt. Nabeshima)
- 7th Destroyer Division (Capt. Kaname Konishi)
  - 3 Fubuki-class destroyers
    - Akebono (Lt. Cmdr. Minoru Nakagawa)
    - Ushio (Lt. Cmdr. Yoshitake Uesugi)
    - Sazanami (Lt. Cmdr. Hiroshi Uwai)
- AO Teiyo Maru (Capt. Katasuke Tanaka)

=== Aleutian Support Force ===
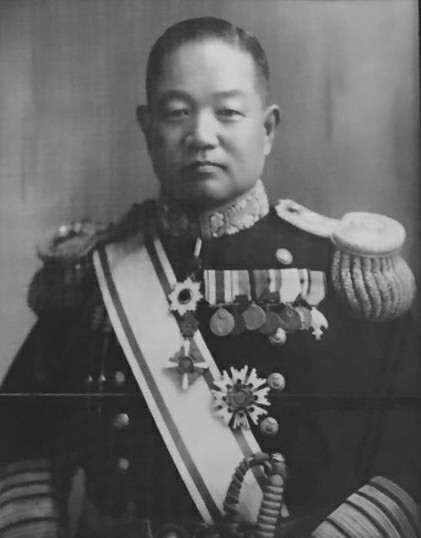
Shiro Takasu

Vice Admiral Shiro Takasu (Note: Died of illness September 1944 six months after promotion to full admiral) in Hyūga

- 2nd Battleship Division (Vice Adm. Takasu)
  - Fusō (Capt. Chozaemon Obata)
  - Hyūga (Capt. Chiaki Matsuda)
  - Ise (Capt. Isamu Takeda)
  - Yamashiro (Capt. Gunji Kogure)
- Screening Force (Rear Adm. Fukuji Kishi in Kitakami)
  - 9th Cruiser Division (Rear Adm. Fukuji Kishi in Kitakami)
    - CL Kitakami (Capt. Saiji Norimitsu)
    - CL Ōi (Capt. Moichi Narita)
  - 20th Destroyer Division (Capt. Yuji Yamada)
    - 4 Fubuki-class destroyers
      - Asagiri (Lt. Cmdr. Nisaburo Maekawa)
      - Yūgiri (Cmdr. Masayoshi Motokura)
      - Shirakumo (Cmdr. Toyoji Hitomi)
      - Amagiri (Capt. Buichi Ashida)
  - 24th Destroyer Division (Capt. Yasuji Hirai)
    - 4 Shiratsuyu-class destroyers
      - Umikaze (Cmdr. Nagahide Sugitani)
      - Yamakaze (Lt. Cmdr. Shuichi Hamanaka)
      - Kawakaze (Lt. Cmdr. Kazuo Wakabayashi)
      - Suzukaze (Lt. Cmdr. Kazuo Shibayama)
  - 27th Destroyer Division (Capt. Matake Yoshimura)
    - 2 Hatsuharu-class destroyers
      - Ariake (Lt. Cmdr. Shoichi Yoshida)
      - Yūgure (Lt. Cmdr. Kiyoshi Kamo)
    - 2 Shiratsuyu-class destroyers
      - Shigure (Cmdr. Noboru Seo)
      - Shiratsuyu (Lt. Cmdr. Kanematsu Hashimoto)
- Supply Group (Capt. Matsuo Eguchi)
  - AO San Clemente Maru (Capt. Eguchi)
  - AO Toa Maru (Capt. Yataro Yokohama)

=== Attu Invasion Force ===
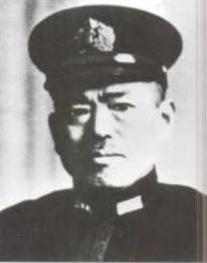
Sentarō Ōmori

Rear Admiral Sentarō Ōmori (Note: Later oversaw work with torpedo suicide weapons; survived war) in Abukuma

  - 1st Destroyer Squadron
  - Rear Admiral Ōmori
- CL Abukuma (Capt. Seiroku Murayama)
- 21st Destroyer Division (Capt. Toshio Shimizu)
  - 4 Hatsuharu-class destroyers
    - Wakaba (Lt. Cmdr. Masakichi Kuroki)
    - Nenohi (Lt. Cmdr. Saburo Terauchi)
    - Hatsuharu (Lt. Cmdr. Hiroshi Makino)
    - Hatsushimo (Lt. Cmdr. Satoru Kohama)
- ML Magane Maru (Capt. Heiji Sasaki)
- AP Kinugasa Maru (Capt. Naoshi Arima) carrying 1,200 army troops under Major Matsutoshi Hozumi

=== Kiska Invasion Force ===
Captain Takeji Ono in Kiso

- 21st Cruiser Division (Vice Adm. Boshirō Hosogaya in Nachi)
  - 2 Kuma-class cruisers
    - Kiso (Capt. Ono)
    - Tama (Capt. Masaharu Kawabata)
  - 2 auxiliary cruisers
    - Asaka Maru (Capt. Jiro Ban)
    - Awata Maru (Capt. Kikuta Maki)
- Screening Force
  - 6th Destroyer Division (Capt. Yusuke Tamada)
    - 2 Akatsuki-class destroyers
      - Hibiki (Lt. Cmdr. Hagumu Ishii)
      - Akatsuki (Lt. Cmdr. Osamu Takasuka)
    - 1 Minekaze-class destroyer
      - Hakaze (Lt. Cmdr. Tomo Tanaka)
- 13th Minesweeper Division (Capt. Toshio Mitsuka)
  - Hakuhō Maru
  - Kaihō Maru
  - Shunkotsu Maru
- Transports
  - Hakusan Maru (Capt. Hareyoshi Goto) carrying 550 troops under Lt. Cmdr. Hifumi Mukai
  - Kumagawa Maru (Capt. Shiro Yoshida) carrying 700 labor troops with construction equipment
- Submarine Detachment
  - 1st Submarine Squadron (Rear Adm. Shigeaki Yamakazi)
    - I-9 (Cmdr. Akiyoshi Fujii)
    - 2nd Submarine Division (Capt. Hiroshi Imazato)
      - I-15 (Cmdr. Nobuo Ishikawa)
      - I-17 (Cmdr. Kozo Nishino)
      - I-19 (Cmdr. Shogo Narahara)
    - 4th Submarine Division (Capt. Mitsuru Nagai)
        - I-25 (Cmdr. Akiji Tagami)
      - I-26 (Cmdr. Minoru Yokota)
- Aleutian Seaplane Tender Force (Capt. Keiichi Ujuku)
  - AV Kimikawa Maru (Capt. Ujuku)
    - Air Unit: 8 3-seat floatplanes
  - 1 Minekaze-class destroyer
    - Shiokaze (Lt. Yoji Tanegashima)

== United States ==
The US Pacific Fleet and Pacific Ocean Areas were under the overall command of Admiral Chester W. Nimitz.

=== Task Force 17 ===
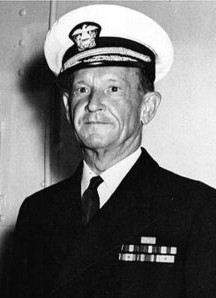
Frank Jack Fletcher

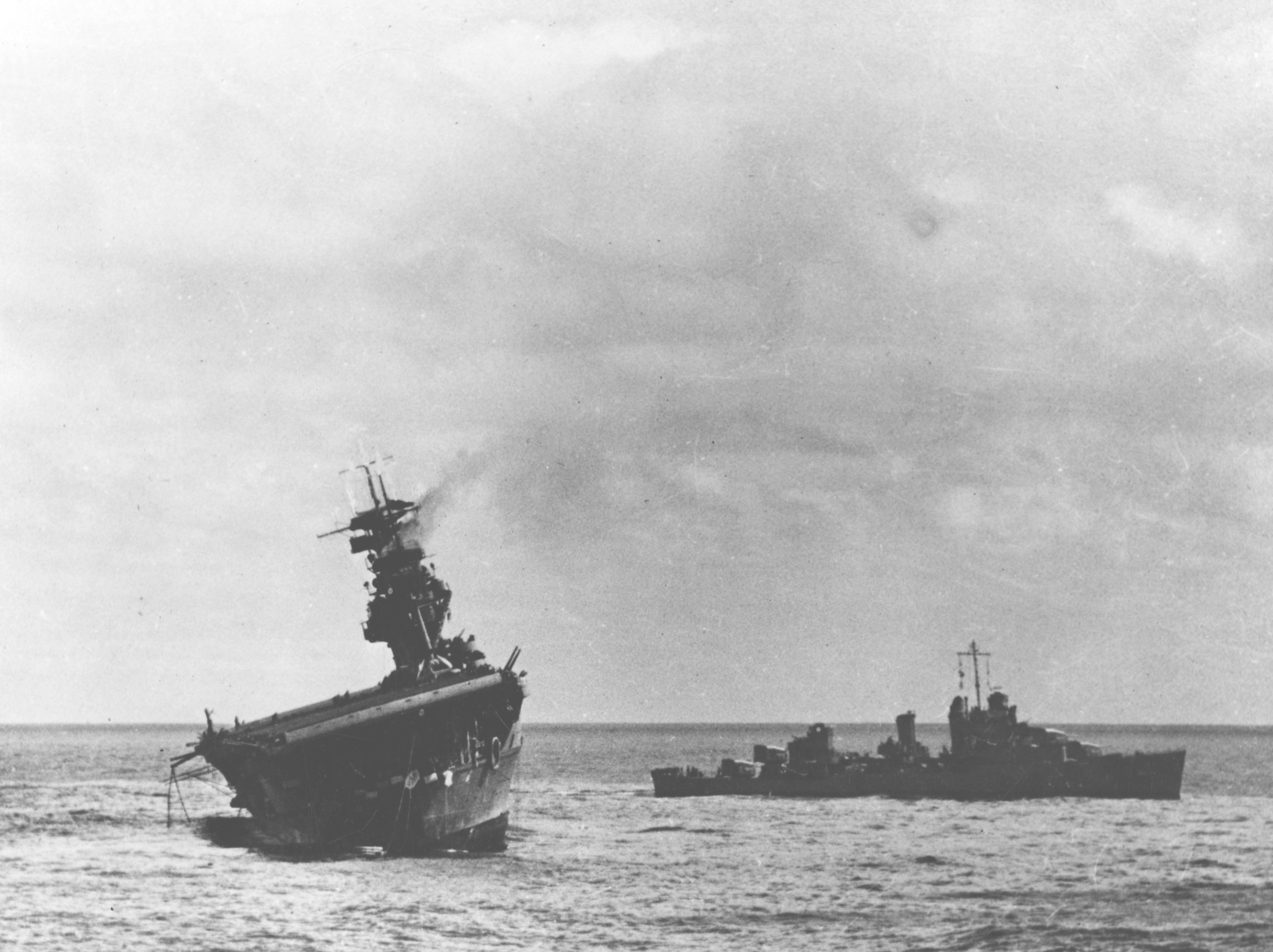
Damaged Yorktown with destroyer Balch standing by

Rear Admiral Frank J. Fletcher (Note: Held overall command of invasion forces for Guadalcanal August 1942..) in Yorktown

- Task Group 17.5 (Carrier Group)
  - Yorktown (sunk by I-168 7 June) (Captain Elliott Buckmaster)
    - Yorktown Air Group (Note: Including elements from the sidelined Saratoga air group) (Lieutenant Commander Oscar Pederson)
      - 25 Grumman F4F-4 Wildcat fighters (VF-3 – Lt. Cmdr. John S. Thach)
      - 18 Douglas SBD-3 Dauntless dive bombers (VB-3 – Lt. Cmdr. Maxwell F. Leslie)
      - 19 Douglas SBD-3 Dauntless dive bombers (VS-5 – Lt. Wallace C. Short, Jr.)
      - 13 Douglas TBD-1 Devastator (Note: These aircraft were obsolete by mid-1942 and their slow speed allowed them to be practically wiped out during their attacks on the Japanese carriers. This sacrifice, however, was instrumental in allowing the US dive bombers to appear over Nagumo's task force almost unnoticed.) torpedo bombers (VT-3 – Lt. Cmdr. Lance E. Massey†)
- Task Group 17.2 (Cruiser Group)
- Rear Admiral William W. Smith (Note: Held desk job for remainder of war following disappointing performance in Aleutian Islands campaign.) in Astoria
  - 1 New Orleans-class heavy cruiser (9 × 8-in. main battery)
    - Astoria (Capt. Francis W. Scanland)
  - 1 Portland-class heavy cruiser (9 × 8-in. main battery)
    - Portland (Capt. Laurance T. DuBose)
- Task Group 17.4 (Destroyer Screen)
- Captain Gilbert Hoover, (Note: Impulsively relieved of command by Halsey following loss of light cruiser USS Juneau November 1942, a career-ruining move Halsey later supposedly expressed regret over.) COMDESRON 2
  - 5 Sims-class destroyers (4 × 5-in. main battery)
    - Hammann (sunk by I-168 7 June) (Commander Arnold E. True)
    - Anderson (Lt. Cmdr. William M. Hobby, Jr.)
    - Hughes (Lt. Cmdr. Donald J. Ramsey)
    - Morris (Cmdr. Harry B. Jarrett)
    - Russell (Lt. Cmdr. J. C. Pollock)
  - 1 Gleaves-class destroyer (5 × 5-in. main battery)
    - Gwin (Lt. Cmdr. John M. Higgins)

=== Task Force 16 ===
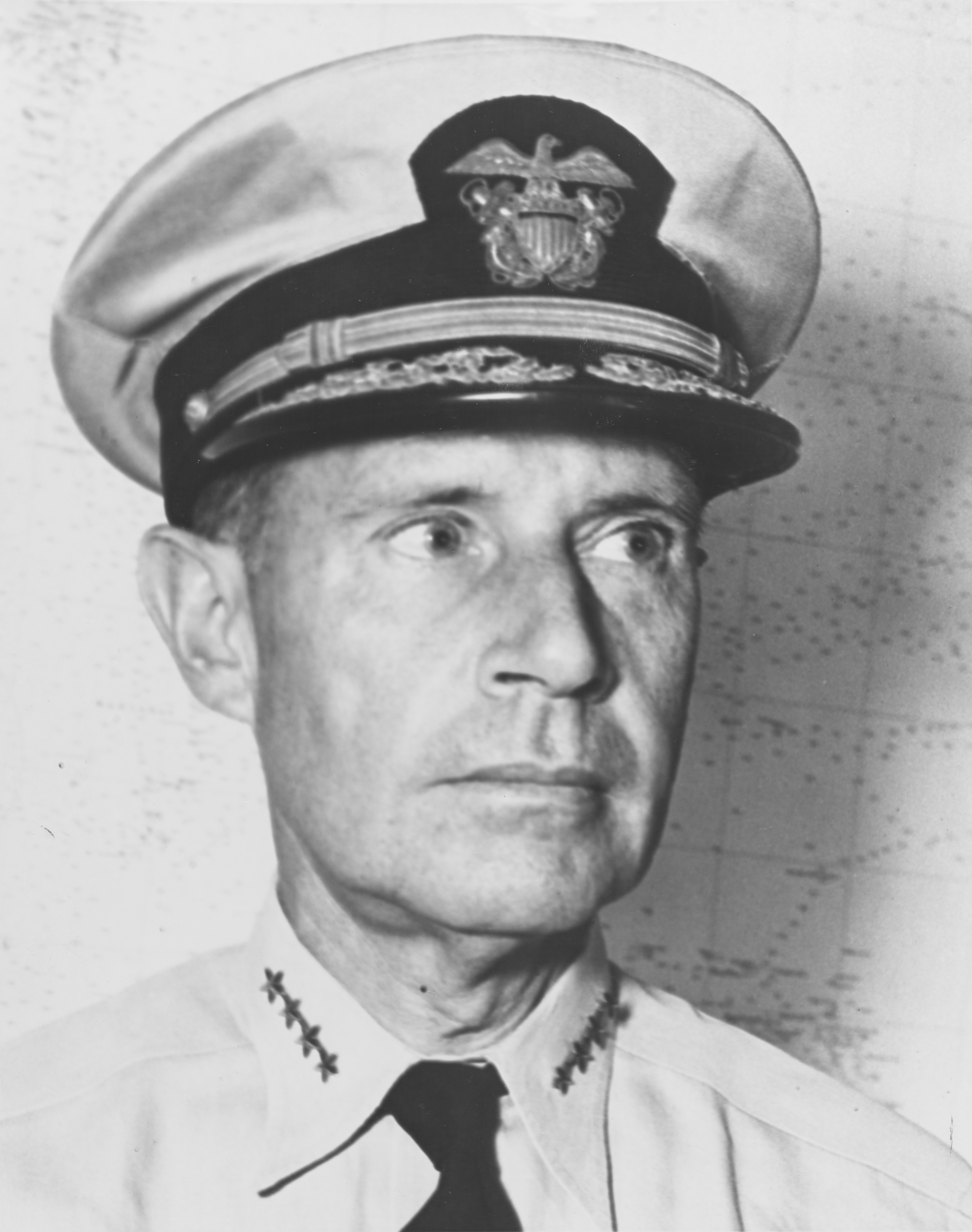
Raymond A. Spruance as a full admiral

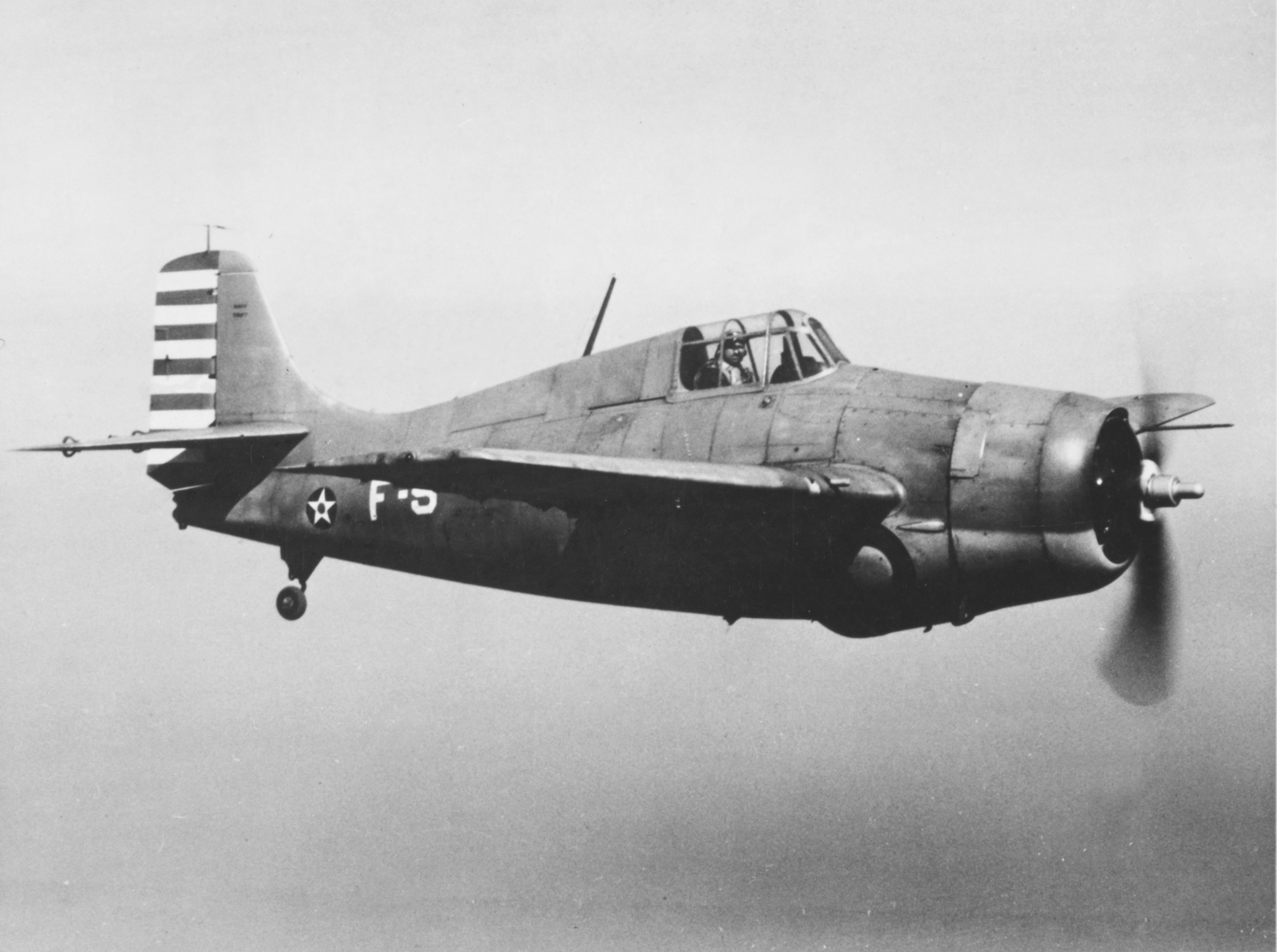
Grumman F4F Wildcat

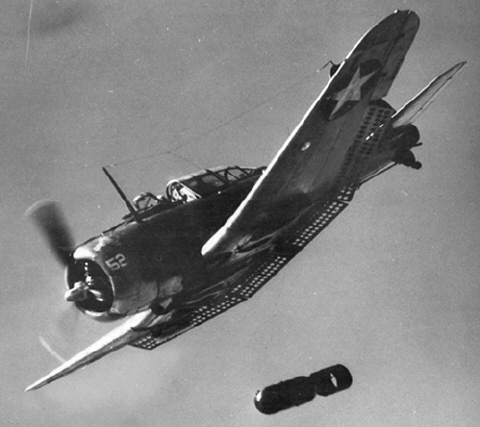
Douglas SBD Dauntless

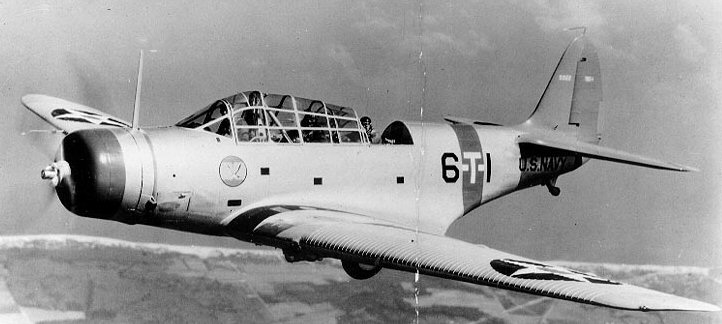
Douglas TBD Devastator

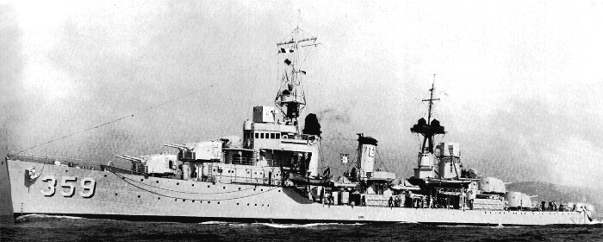
Porter-class destroyer pre-war

Rear Admiral Raymond A. Spruance (Note: Later promoted to full admiral and commanded US Third Fleet.) in Enterprise

- Task Group 16.5 (Carrier Group):
  - Enterprise (Capt. George D. Murray) (Note: Later promoted to full admiral and commanded US First Fleet after war.)
    - Enterprise Air Group (Lt. Cmdr. C. Wade McClusky)
      - 27 F4F-4 fighters (VF-6 – Lt. James S. Gray)
      - 19 SBD-2/3 dive bombers (VB-6 – Lt. Richard H. Best)
      - 19 SBD-2/3 dive bombers (VS-6 – Lt. Wilmer E. Gallaher)
      - 14 TBD-1 torpedo bombers (VT-6 – Lt. Cmdr. Eugene E. Lindsey†)
  - Hornet (Capt. Marc A. Mitscher, promoted to Rear Adm en route) (Note: An early proponent of naval aviation; later promoted to full admiral and commanded Fast Carrier Task Force.)
    - Hornet Air Group (Cmdr. Stanhope C. Ring)
      - 27 F4F-4 fighters (VF-8 – Lt. Cmdr. Samuel G. Mitchell)
      - 19 SBD-2/3 dive bombers (VB-8 – Lt. Cmdr. Robert R. Johnson)
      - 18 SBD-1/2/3 dive bombers (VS-8 – Lt. Cmdr. Walter F. Rodee)
      - 15 TBD-1 torpedo bombers (VT-8 – Lt. Cmdr. John C. Waldron†)
- Task Group 16.2 (Cruiser Group)
- Rear Admiral Thomas C. Kinkaid, (Note: Later promoted to full admiral and commanded US Seventh Fleet.) COMCRUDIV 6
  - 1 Pensacola-class heavy cruiser (10 × 8-in. main battery)
    - Pensacola (Capt. Frank L. Lowe)
  - 1 Northampton-class heavy cruiser (9 × 8-in. main battery)
    - Northampton (Capt. William D. Chandler Jr.)
  - 3 New Orleans-class heavy cruisers (9 × 8-in. main battery)
    - New Orleans (Capt. Howard H. Good)
    - Minneapolis (Capt. Frank J. Lowry) (Note: Later promoted to vice admiral and commanded amphibious forces in both Mediterranean and Pacific Theatres.)
    - Vincennes (Capt. Frederick L. Riefkohl) (Note: First Puerto Rican to graduate from US Naval Academy; relieved following disastrous Battle of Savo Island and never held another sea command.)
  - 1 anti-aircraft light cruiser (16 × 5-in. main battery)
    - Atlanta (Capt. Samuel P. Jenkins)
- Task Group 16.4 (Destroyer Screen)
- Captain Alexander R. Early, COMDESRON 1
  - Destroyer Squadron 1
    - 1 Porter-class destroyer (8 × 5-in. main battery)
      - Phelps (Lt. Cmdr. Edward L. Beck)
    - 3 Farragut-class destroyers (5 × 5-in. main battery)
      - Worden (Lt. Cmdr. William G. Pogue)
      - Monaghan (Lt. Cmdr. William P. Burford)
      - Aylwin (Lt. Cmdr. George R. Phelan)
  - Destroyer Squadron 6
    - 1 Gridley-class destroyer (4 × 5-in. main battery)
      - Maury (Lt. Cmdr. Gelzer L. Sims)
    - 2 Benham-class destroyers (4 × 5-in. main battery)
      - Benham (Lt. Cmdr. Joseph M. Worthington)
      - Ellet (Lt. Cmdr. Francis H. Gardner)
    - 1 Mahan-class destroyer (5 × 5-in. main battery)
      - Conyngham (Lt. Cmdr. Henry C. Daniel)
    - 1 Porter-class destroyer (8 × 5-in. main battery)
      - Balch (Lt. Cmdr. Harold H. Thiemroth)
- Oilers Group
  - AO Cimarron (Cmdr. Russell H. Ihrig)
  - AO Platte (Capt. Ralph H. Henkle)
  - DD Dewey (Lt. Cmdr. C.F. Chillingworth, Jr.)
  - DD Monssen (Cmdr. Roland N. Smoot) (Note: Received ten commendations over his service in war.)

=== Submarines ===
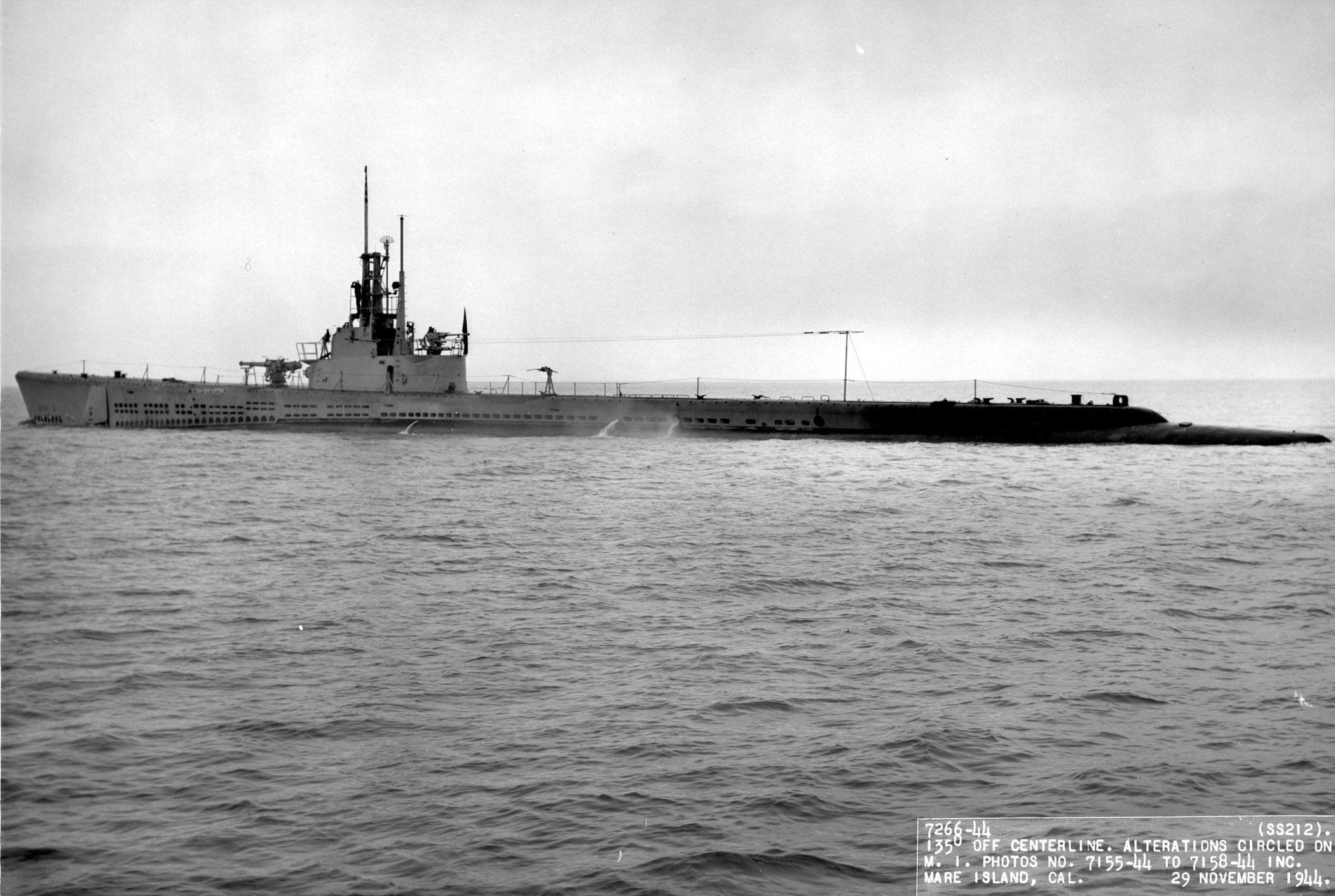
Gato class

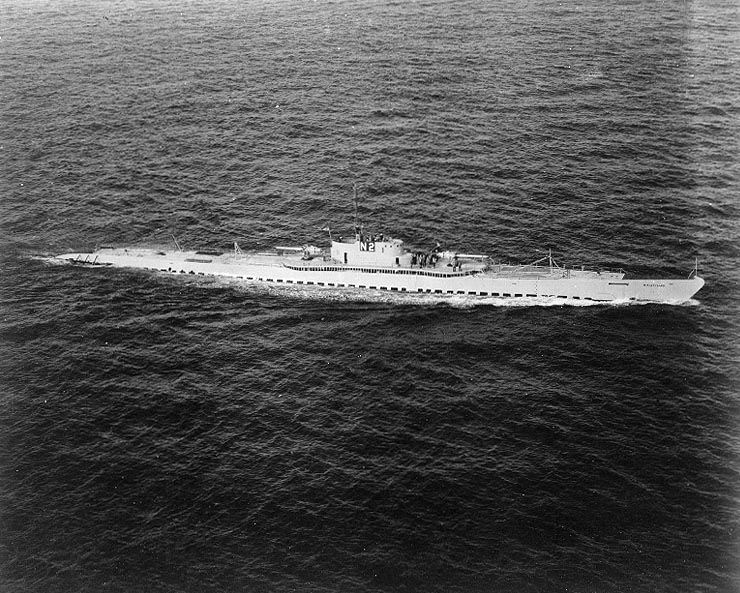
Nautilus class

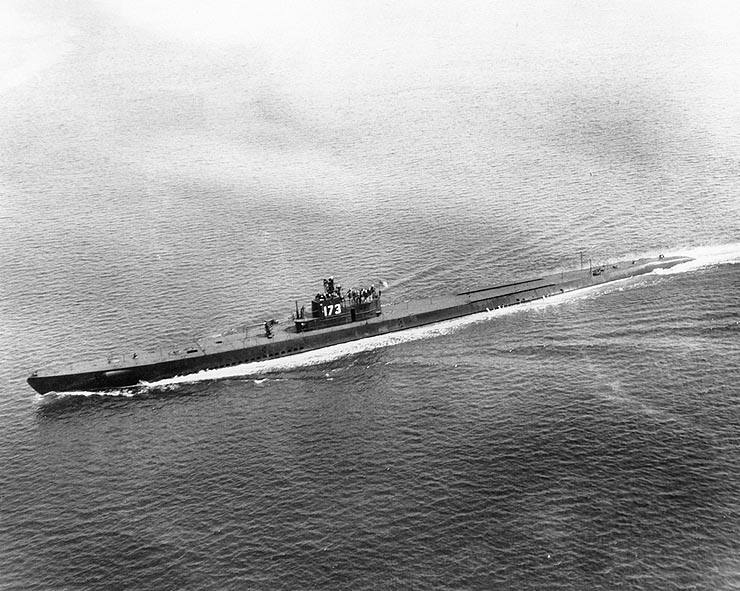
Porpoise class

Rear Admiral Robert H. English (Note: Killed in plane crash in Mendocino County, California January 1943.)
Commander, Submarine Force, Pacific Fleet, HQ at Pearl Harbor

- Task Group 7.1 (Midway Patrol Group)
  - 3 Gato-class (10 tubes: 6 forward, 4 aft):
    - Gato (Lt. Cmdr. W.G. Myers)
    - Grouper (Lt. Cmdr. C.E. Duke)
    - Flying Fish (Lt. Cmdr. Glynn R. Donaho)
  - 5 Tambor-class (10 tubes: 6 forward, 4 aft):
    - Tambor (Lt. Cmdr. J.W. Murphy)
    - Trout (Lt. Cmdr. Frank W. Fenno Jr.)
    - Grayling (Lt. Cmdr. E. Olsen)
    - Grenadier (Lt. Cmdr. Willis A. Lent)
    - Gudgeon (Lt. Cmdr. H.B. Lyon)
  - 4 Narwhal-class (6 tubes: 4 forward, 2 aft):
    - Nautilus (Lt. Cmdr. William H. Brockman Jr.)
    - Dolphin (Lt. Cmdr. R.L. Rutter)
    - Cachalot (Lt. Cmdr. G.A. Lewis)
    - Cuttlefish (Lt. Cmdr. Martin P. Hottel)
- Task Group 7.2 ("Roving Short-Stops")
  - 1 Gato-class (10 tubes: 6 forward, 4 aft):
    - Trigger (Lt. Cmdr. J.H. Lewis)
  - 1 Porpoise-class (6 tubes: 4 forward, 2 aft):
    - Plunger (Lt. Cmdr. D.C. White)
  - 1 Narwhal-class (6 tubes: 4 forward, 2 aft):
    - Narwhal (Lt. Cmdr. C.W. Wilkins)
- Task Group 7.3 (North of Oahu Patrol)
  - 2 Gato-class (10 tubes: 6 forward, 4 aft):
    - Growler (Lt. Cmdr. Howard W. Gilmore)
    - Finback (Lt. Cmdr. J.L. Hull)
  - 2 Porpoise-class (6 tubes: 4 forward, 2 aft):
    - Pike (Lt. Cmdr. W.A. New)
    - Tarpon (Lt. Cmdr. Lewis Wallace)

=== Midway Garrison ===
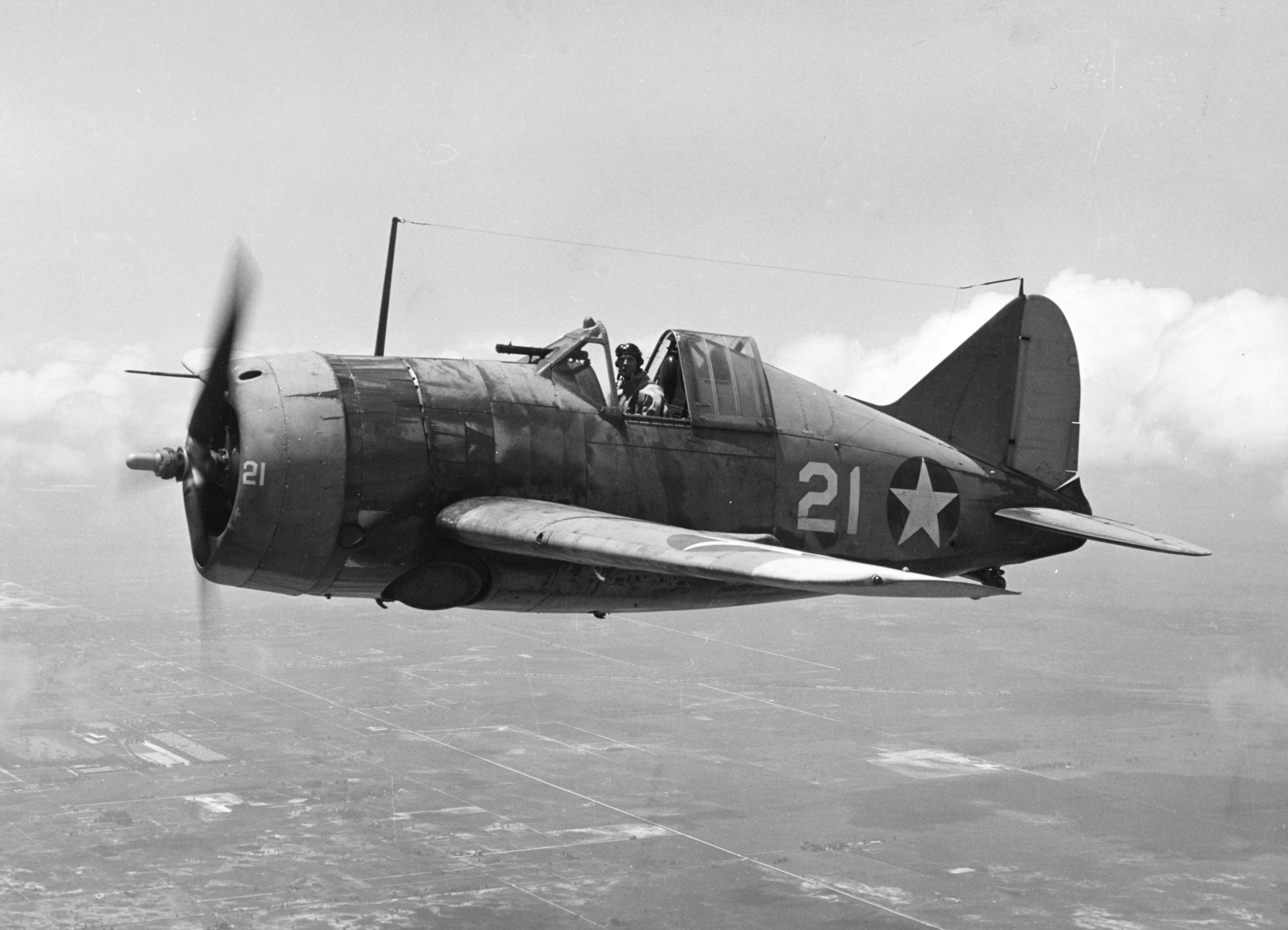
Brewster Buffalo

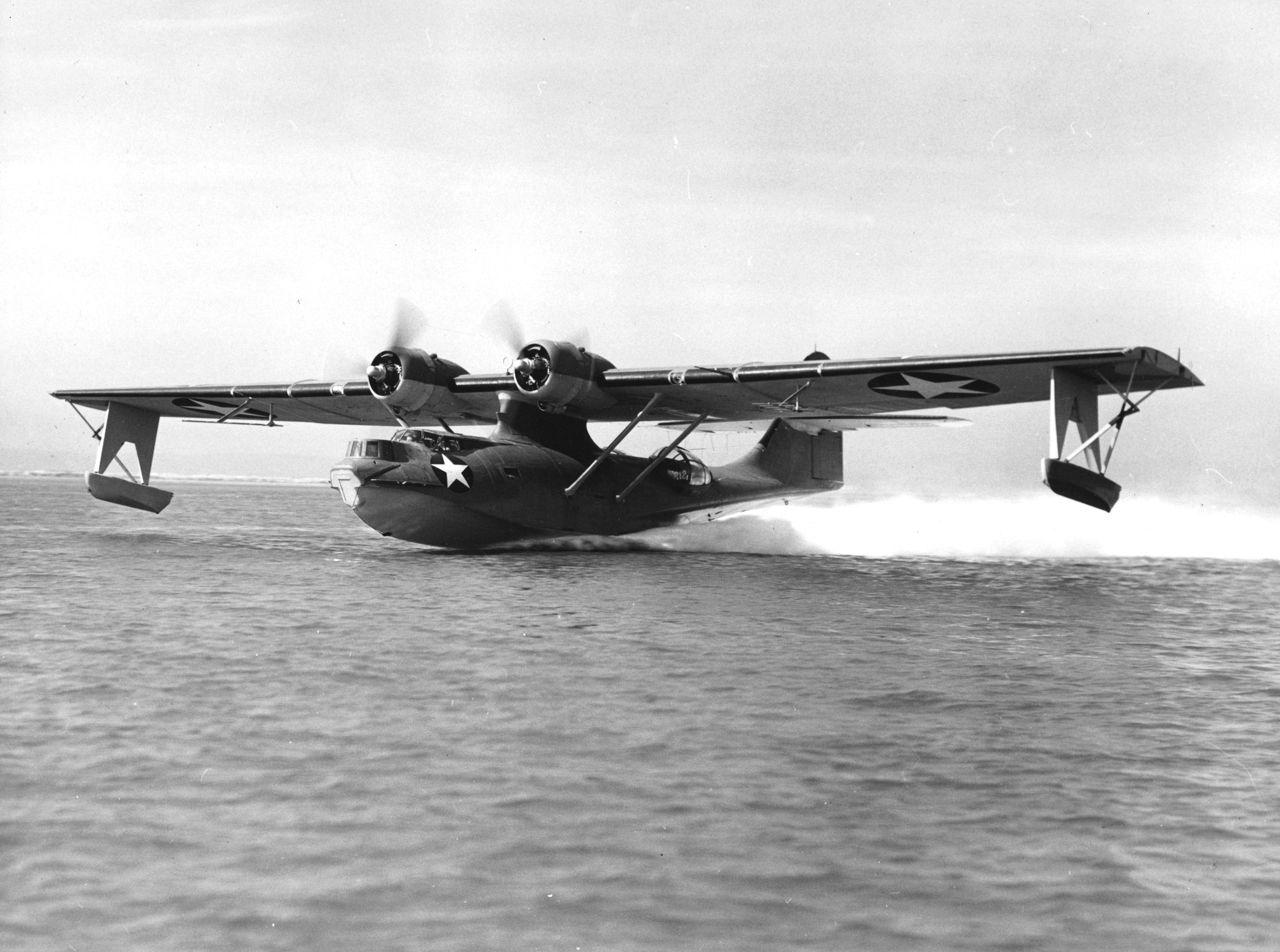
Consolidated Aircraft PBY Catalina

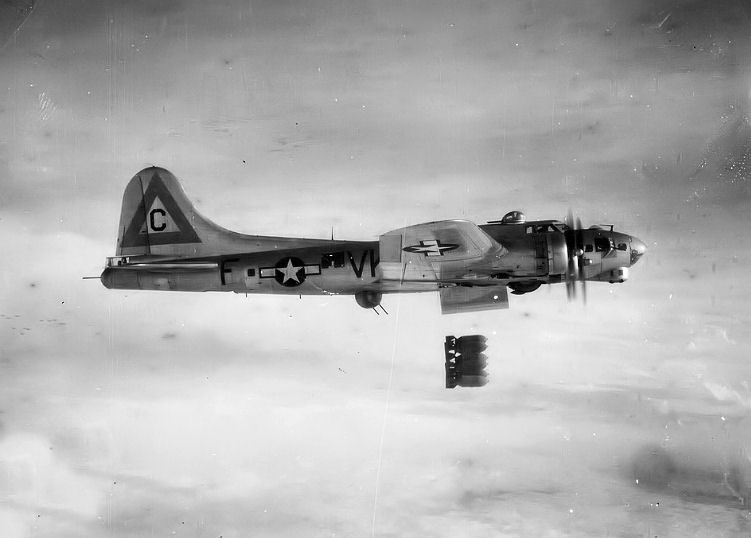
Boeing B-17

- Air group
  - Marine Aircraft Group 22
  - Colonel Ira L. Kimes, USMC
    - 21 Brewster F2A-3 Buffalo (Note: These aircraft were obsolete by mid-1942 and were no match for the advanced Mitsubishi Zero.) (VMF-221, Major Floyd B. Parks†, USMC)
    - 7 Grumman F4F-3A Wildcat (VMF-221, Captain John F. Carey, USMC)
    - 19 Douglas SBD-2 Dauntless (VMSB-241 Major Lofton R. Henderson†, USMC)
    - 17 Chance-Vought SB2U-3 Vindicator (VMSB-241, Major Benjamin W. Norris†, USMC)
  - Navy Air Units
  - Captain Cyril T. Simard
    - 31 PBY-5 and PBY-5A Catalinas (Detachments from Patrol Wings 1 and 2, USN)
    - 6 Grumman TBF Avenger (Detachment from VT-8, USS Hornet - Lt. Langdon K. Fieberling†, USN)
  - Detachment of Seventh Air Force
  - Major General Willis Hale
    - 4 Martin B-26 Marauder (Detachments from the 18th Reconnaissance and 69th Bombardment Squadrons - Capt. James Collins, USAAF)
    - 17 Boeing B-17 Flying Fortress (Detachments from the 26th, 31st, 72nd, and 431st Bombardment Squadrons - Lt.Col. Walter C. Sweeney Jr., USAAF)
- Local Defenses
- Colonel Harold D. Shannon, Fleet Marine Force commander
  - "C" and "D" Companies, 2nd Raider Battalion, USMC
  - 6th Defense Battalion (Reinforced) USMC Colonel Harold D. Shannon
  - USS Allen (DD-66)
  - 1st Motor Torpedo Boat Squadron
    - 11 PT boats (9 at Midway Island and 2 at Kure Atoll)

=== Deployed along lesser reefs and islands of the Hawaiian Group ===
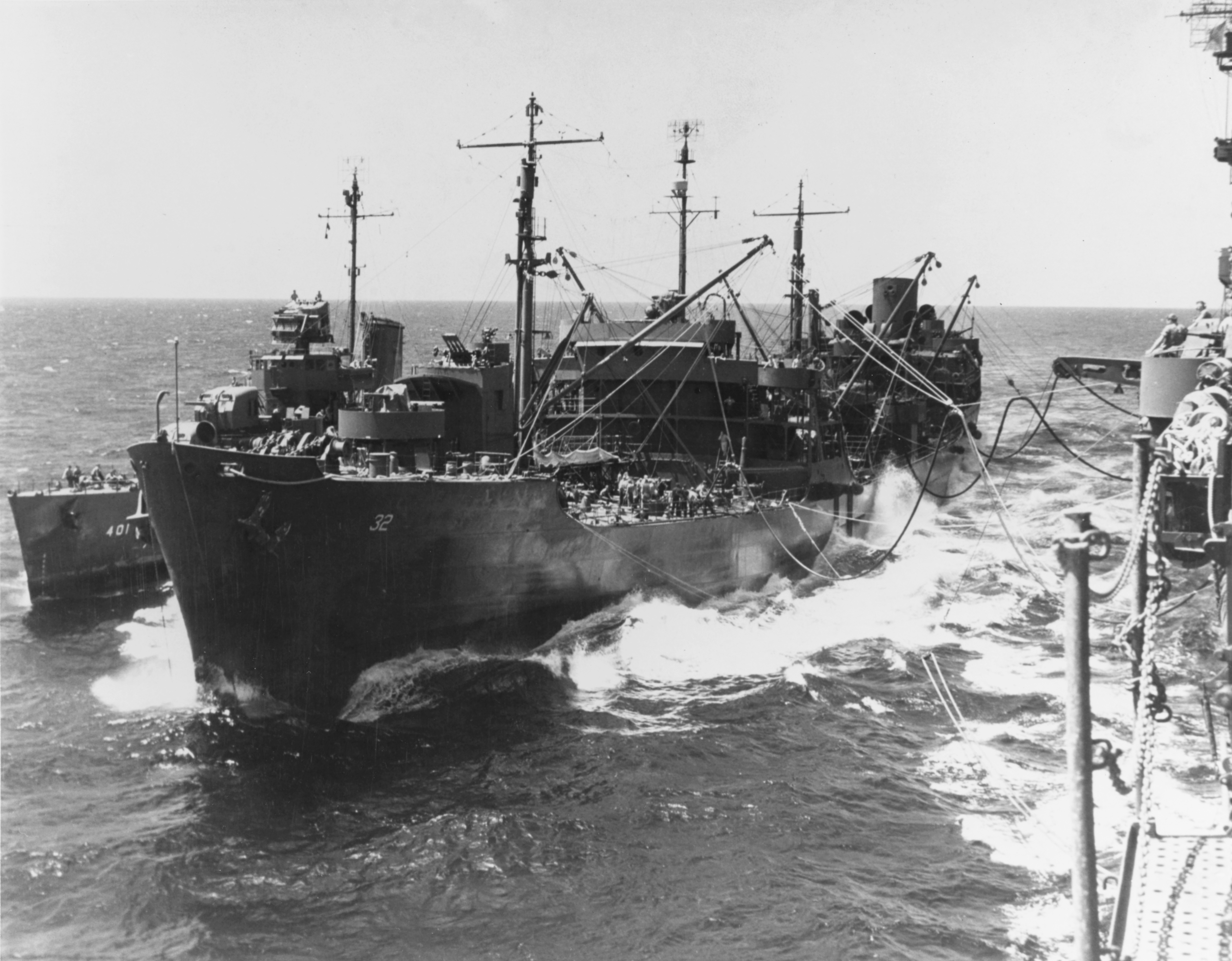
Oiler Guadalupe refueling a destroyer and a carrier

- French Frigate Shoals
  - seaplane tenders Thornton and Ballard
  - gasoline tanker Kaloli
  - destroyer Clark
- Pearl and Hermes Reef
  - patrol boat Crystal
  - fleet tug Vireo
- Lisianski Island
  - patrol boat YP-284
- Gardner Pinnacles
  - patrol boat YP-345
- Laysan Island
  - patrol boat YP-290
- Necker Island
  - patrol boat YP-350

=== Midway Refueling Unit ===
- Cmdr. Harry R. Thurber, USN
  - AO Guadalupe
  - DD Blue and Ralph Talbot

The military forces at the immediate point of tactical contact (i.e. not including support formations) are described below.

== Aircraft ==
=== American Forces ===
Naval Air Station (NAS) Midway operated:

United States Navy

- 31 Consolidated PBY-5 Catalina, seaplanes.
- 6 Grumman TBF-1 Avenger, torpedo bombers (5 lost)

United States Army Air Forces

- 4 Martin B-26 Marauder, medium bombers
- 17 Boeing B-17 Flying Fortress, heavy bombers

United States Marine Corps

- 19 Douglas SBD-2 Dauntless, dive bombers
- 17 Chance-Vought SB2U-3 Vindicator, dive bombers
- 21 Brewster F2A Buffalo, fighters
- 7 Grumman F4F-3A Wildcat, fighters
- 1 light utility aircraft

Task Force 17:

Yorktown: 77 aircraft (sunk)

- 25 Grumman F4F-4 Wildcat, fighters
- 37 Douglas SBD-3 Dauntless, dive bombers
- 15 Douglas TBD-1 Devastator, torpedo bombers (13 lost)

Task Force 16:

Enterprise: 78 aircraft

- 27 Grumman F4F-4 Wildcat, fighters
- 37 Douglas SBD-3 Dauntless, dive bombers
- 14 Douglas TBD-1 Devastator, torpedo bombers (10 lost)

Hornet: 77 aircraft

- 27 Grumman F4F-4 Wildcat, fighters
- 35 Douglas SBD-3 Dauntless, dive bombers
- 15 Douglas TBD-1 Devastator, torpedo bombers (all lost)

=== Japanese Forces ===
The Japanese carriers of the Striking Force operated:

Akagi: 60 aircraft (sunk)

- 24 Mitsubishi A6M Zero, fighters
- 18 Aichi D3A,"Val" dive bombers
- 18 Nakajima B5N,"Kate" torpedo bombers

Kaga: 74 aircraft (sunk)

- 27 Mitsubishi A6M Zero, fighters
- 18 Aichi D3A,"Val" dive bombers
- 27 Nakajima B5N,"Kate" torpedo bombers
- 2 Aichi D3A,"Val" dive bombers (as cargo, likely non-operational)

Hiryū: 57 aircraft (sunk)

- 21 Mitsubishi A6M Zero, fighters
- 18 Aichi D3A,"Val" dive bombers
- 18 Nakajima B5N,"Kate" torpedo bombers

Sōryū: 57 aircraft (sunk)

- 21 Mitsubishi A6M Zero, fighters
- 16 Aichi D3A,"Val" dive bombers
- 18 Nakajima B5N,"Kate" torpedo bombers
- 2 Yokosuka D4Y1C, pre-series dive bombers (experimental reconnaissance aircraft)

(Note: These figures include 21 operational Zero fighters of the 6th Air Group being ferried to Midway by the carriers.)

- Japanese battleships and cruisers: 16 reconnaissance floatplanes, most of them short-ranged (5 Aichi E13A, 10 Nakajima E8N, 1 Aichi E11A)
