= 3rd Naval Armaments Supplement Programme =

Third of four Imperial Japanese Naval Expansion plans

The 3rd Naval Armaments Supplement Programme (第三次海軍軍備補充計画, Dai-San-Ji Kaigun Gunbi Hojū Keikaku), otherwise known as the "Circle 3 Plan" (マル3計画, Maru 3 Keikaku), was the third of four expansion plans of the Imperial Japanese Navy between 1930 and the start of World War II.

== Background ==
The London Naval Treaty placed severe restrictions on Japan's naval capabilities vis-a-vis the United States Navy and the British Royal Navy in terms of tonnage and numbers of capital warships. The response of the Imperial Japanese Navy General Staff was to initiate a construction program (Maru-1) to build 39 new warships to the allotted tonnage limits in each of the restricted categories, and to invest in types of warships and weaponry not specifically covered by the provisions of the treaty, such as expansion of the Imperial Japanese Navy Air Service to 14 Naval Air Groups

In 1934, the Naval Ministry submitted its second expansion plan Maru-2 to the Cabinet, to make up for the shortfall in funding caused by modifications to rectify issues with existing equipment after the Tomozuru Incident and IJN 4th Fleet Incident, when it was revealed that the basic designs of many Japanese warships were flawed due to poor construction techniques and instability caused by attempting to mount too much weaponry on too small a displacement hull. In addition, 48 new warships and creation of eight new Naval Air Groups were funded.

By 1937, the term of the London Naval Treaty had expired, and the Japanese government refused overtures to participate in further disarmament negotiations. Instead, a massive third expansion plan was officially ratified by the Diet of Japan in 1937, calling for 66 new combat vessels, centering on two of the new Yamato-class battleships and two Shōkaku-class aircraft carriers, and expansion of the Imperial Japanese Navy Air Service by 14 more Naval Air Groups.

This plan was a multiyear (six year) budget, and allocated a total of 806,549,000 Yen was allotted for warship construction and 75,267,000 Yen for naval aviation. The final three vessels (two Katori class training cruisers, plus Ikino supply ship) were funded under the 1938 Supplementary Estimates.

== Table of vessels ==
| Category | Class | Vessel number(s) | Completed | Converted | Cancelled |
| Battleship | Yamato | #1 - 2 | Yamato (#1), Musashi (#2) | | |
| Aircraft carrier | Shōkaku | #3 - 4 | Shōkaku (#3), Zuikaku (#4) | | |
| Seaplane Tender | Nisshin | #5 | Nisshin (#5) | | |
| Minelayer Type-B | Tsugaru | #6 | Tsugaru (#6) | | |
| Minelayer (Netlayer) | Hatsutaka | #7 - 8 | Hatsutaka (#7), Aotaka (#8) | | |
| Escort ship Type-A | Shimushu | #9 - 12 | Shimushu (#9), Kunashiri (#10), Hachijo (#11), Ishigaki (#12) | | |
| Gunboat Type-A | Hashidate | #13 - 14 | Hashidate (#13), Uji (#14) | | |
| Gunboat Type-B | Fushimi | #15 - 16 | Fushimi (#15), Sumida (#16) | | |
| Destroyer Type-A | Kagerō | #17 - 34 | Kagerō (#17), Shiranui (#18), Kuroshio (#19), Oyashio (#20), Hayashio (#21), Natsushio (#22), Hatsukaze (#23), Yukikaze (#24), Amatsukaze (#25), Tokitsukaze (#26), Urakaze (#27), Isokaze (#28), Hamakaze (#29), Tanikaze (#30), Nowaki (#31) | #32-34 were dummy of naval budget of the Yamato-class battleships | |
| Cruiser submarine Type-A | I-9 | #35 - 36 | I-9 (#35), I-10 (#36) | | |
| Cruiser submarine Type-B | I-15 | #37 - 43 | I-15 (#37), I-17 (#38), I-19 (#39), I-21 (#40), I-23 (#41), I-25 (#42) | #43 was dummy of naval budget of the Yamato-class battleships | |
| Cruiser submarine Type-C | I-16 | #44 - 48 | I-16 (#44), I-18 (#45), I-20 (#46), I-22 (#47), I-24 (#48) | | |
| Minesweeper | No.7 | #49 - 54 | No.7 (#49) to No.12 (#54) | | |
| Munition transporter | Kashino | #55 | Kashino (#55) | | |
| Survey ship | Tsukushi | #56 | Tsukushi (#56) | | |
| Minelayer | Sokuten | #57 - 61 | Sokuten (#57), Shirakami (#58), Naryū (#59), Kyosai (#60), Ukishima (#61) | | |
| Submarine chaser | No.4 | #62 - 70 | No.7 (#62), No.8 (#63), No.4 (#64), No.5 (#65), No.11 (#66), No.12 (#67), No.10 (#68), No.9 (#69), No.6 (#70) | | |
| Experimental submarine | 71st vessel | #71 | #71 | | |
| Training cruiser | Katori | #72 - 73 | Katori (#72), Kashima (#73) | | |
| Food supply ship | Irako | #74 | Irako (#74) | | |

== See also ==
- 1st Naval Armaments Supplement Programme (Maru 1 Keikaku, 1931)
- 2nd Naval Armaments Supplement Programme (Maru 2 Keikaku, 1934)
- 4th Naval Armaments Supplement Programme (Maru 4 Keikaku, 1939)
- Temporal Naval Armaments Supplement Programme (Maru Rin Keikaku, 1940)
- Rapidly Naval Armaments Supplement Programme (Maru Kyū Keikaku, 1941)
- Additional Naval Armaments Supplement Programme (Maru Tui Keikaku, 1941)
- 5th Naval Armaments Supplement Programme (Maru 5 Keikaku, 1941)
- 6th Naval Armaments Supplement Programme (Maru 6 Keikaku, 1942)
- Modified 5th Naval Armaments Supplement Programme (Kai-Maru 5 Keikaku, 1942)
- Wartime Naval Armaments Supplement Programme (Maru Sen Keikaku, 1944)
