= Japanese cargo ship Tenryō Maru =

World War II-era transport ship

History

Empire of Japan
- Name: Tenryō Maru
- Builder: Kawanami Kōgyō, Nagasaki
- Laid down: 31 October 1936
- Launched: 10 August 1937
- Completed: 15 April 1938
- Acquired: Requisitioned by the Imperial Japanese Army, 16 October 1941
- Identification: 44566
- Fate: Torpedoed and sunk, 29 May 1945
- Notes: Call sign: JIJL

General characteristics
- Class & type: Tenryō Maru-class
- Type: Cargo ship / Icebreaker
- Tonnage: 2,231 grt (6,317 m^{3}) standard
- Length: 77.5 m (254 ft 3 in) o/a
- Beam: 12.80 m (42 ft 0 in)
- Draught: 7.00 m (23 ft 0 in)
- Installed power: 294 nhp / 1,772 ihp (1,321 kW)
- Speed: 10 knots (19 km/h; 12 mph)/ 12.58 knots (23.30 km/h; 14.48 mph) maximum

Tenryō Maru (天領丸) was a requisitioned Imperial Japanese Army ice-strengthened cargo/transport ship during World War II.

== History ==
In September 1936, the Soviet Union ordered three ice-resistant freighters as payment for the purchase of the Southern Manchuria Railway. She was laid down on 31 October 1936 at the Nagasaki shipyard of Kawanami Kōgyō K.K. (jp: 川南工業). She was launched on 10 August 1937 as the Bolshevik (Большевики) and completed on 15 April 1938. Due to a deterioration in the relations with the Soviet Union, the ship was never delivered and was renamed Tenryo Maru. She was one of three ships in her class which included Minryō Maru (民領丸) (ex-Komsomolets) and Chiryō Maru (地領丸) (ex-Volochaevets, and future Sōya). On 18 April 1939, she was sold to Tatsunan Merchant Ship Co., Ltd. of Osaka. On 1 February 1944, ownership was transferred to Tatsuma Kisen Co., Ltd. of Nishinomiya which had merged with her prior owner.

On 16 October 1941, she was requisitioned by the Imperial Japanese Army. She spent most of 1942 providing supplies to Japanese activities in Korea and China. In 1943, her activities shifted to supplying troops in the Kurile Islands.

On 13 April 1944, she departed Ominato for Matsuwa Jima in Convoy-Ru consisting of Taihei Maru, Rizan Maru, and Madras Maru escorted by the Shimushu-class escort ship, Kunashiri with the destroyers Akebono and Ushio; they arrived safely on 18 April 1944. On 6 January 1945, she left Otaru, Hokkaido for Kataoka, Shumshu as part of Convoy KI-603 with transports Hokushin Maru, Banshu Maru No. 65, and supply ship Shirasaki being escorted by Kunashiri; the convoy arrived at Shumshu on 12 January 1945. On 17 January 1945 she departed Shumshu as part of convoy O-702 with Hokushin Maru and Shirasaki again escorted by Kunashiri arriving at Ominato on 24 January 1945.

On 26 May 1945, she departed Paramushiro for Otaru in convoy-Chi consisting of cargo/transport ships Kuretake Maru, Kasugasan Maru, and supply ship Shirasaki, escorted by Shimushu, Hachijo, Type C escort ships CD-47 and CD-205, and Type D escort ship CD-112. Hachijo was lost in the fog around 50°00′N 146°00′E and CD-205 left the convoy to search for her. On 29 May 1945 at 2055, USS Sterlet fired two spreads of three torpedoes hitting two of the freighters. Tenryō Maru quickly sank at 46°46′N 144°16′E killing 773 out of 947 men of the 23rd Air Defense Battalion, 26 gunners, and 83 sailors. Sterlet also severely damaged Kuretake Maru which sank the following day with a death toll of 272 soldiers and six sailors.
