= Japanese escort ship CD-47 =

History

Japan
- Name: CD-47
- Builder: Nippon Kokan K.K., Tsurumi, Yokohama
- Laid down: 15 July 1944
- Launched: 29 September 1944
- Completed: 2 November 1944
- Commissioned: 2 November 1944
- Stricken: 15 November 1945
- Fate: Sunk by submarine USS Torsk, 14 August 1945

General characteristics
- Class & type: Type C escort ship
- Displacement: 745 long tons (757 t) (standard)
- Length: 67.5 m (221 ft)
- Beam: 8.4 m (27 ft 7 in)
- Draught: 2.9 m (10 ft)
- Propulsion: Geared diesel engines; 1,900 hp (1,417 kW); 2 shafts
- Speed: 16.5 knots (30.6 km/h; 19.0 mph)
- Range: 6,500 nmi (12,000 km) at 14 kn (26 km/h; 16 mph)
- Complement: 136
- Sensors & processing systems: Type 22-Go radar; Type 93 sonar; Type 3 hydrophone
- Armament: As built : 2 × 120 mm (4.7 in)/45 cal DP guns; 6 × Type 96 Type 96 25 mm (0.98 in) AA machine guns (2×3); 12 × Type 3 depth charge throwers; 1 × depth charge chute; 120 × depth charges; 1 × 81 mm (3.2 in) mortar

CD-47 was a C Type class escort ship (Kaibōkan) of the Imperial Japanese Navy during the Second World War.

== History ==
She was laid down by Nippon Kokan K.K. (日本鋼管株式會社) at their Tsurumi, Yokohama shipyard on 15 July 1944, launched on 29 September 1944, and completed and commissioned on 2 November 1944. She was attached to the Yokosuka Defense Force, Yokosuka Naval District under Lieutenant Commander Fukuji Chiba. During the war CD-47 was mostly busy on escort duties mainly to the Ogasawara Islands and the Kurile Islands.

=== Convoy-Chi ===
On 26 May 1945, she departed Paramushiro for Otaru, Hokkaido in convoy-Chi consisting of cargo/transport ships Kuretake Maru, Kasugasan Maru, Tenryo Maru, and supply ship Shirasaki, with Shimushu-class escort ships Shimushu and Hachijo, fellow Type C escort ship CD-205, and Type D escort ship CD-112. Hachijo was lost in the fog around 50°00′N 146°00′E and CD-205 left the convoy to search for her. On 29 May 1945 at 2055, the U.S. submarine USS Sterlet fired two spreads of three torpedoes hitting two of the freighters. Tenryo Maru quickly sank at 46°46′N 144°16′E killing 773 out of 947 men of the 23rd Air Defense Battalion, 26 gunners, and 83 sailors. Sterlet also severely damaged Kuretake Maru which sank the following day with a death toll of 272 soldiers and six sailors.

=== Fate ===
On 15 July 1945, off Otaru, she was damaged along with CD-55 and Etorofu-class escort ship Kasado by U.S. Navy planes from Task Force 38.

On 14 August 1945, while escorting a freighter, she was torpedoed and sunk by the submarine USS Torsk off Tottori in the Sea of Japan (at 35°41′N 134°38′E). On 15 November 1945, she was struck from the Navy List.

== Additional sources ==
- "Escort Vessels of the Imperial Japanese Navy special issue". Ships of the World (in Japanese). Vol. 45. Kaijinsha. February 1996.
- Model Art Extra No.340, Drawings of Imperial Japanese Naval Vessels Part-1 (in Japanese). Model Art Co. Ltd. October 1989.
- The Maru Special, Japanese Naval Vessels No.49, Japanese submarine chasers and patrol boats (in Japanese). Ushio Shobō. March 1981.
