= Nagoya Maru =

Japanese cargo steamship that was sunk in the Second World War

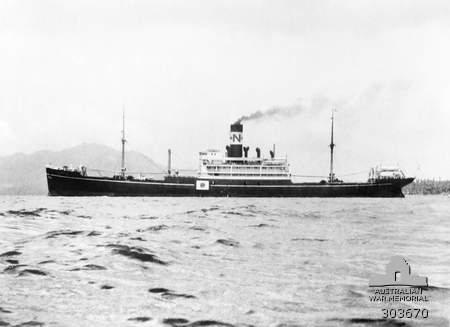
- Nagoya Maru in Nanyo Kaiun colours

History

Japan
- Name: Nagoya Maru
- Namesake: Nagoya
- Owner: 1932: Ishihara Gomei Kaisha; 1935: Nanyo Kaiun KK
- Operator: 1932: Ishihara Sangyo Kaiun Goshi Kaisha; 1941: Imperial Japanese Navy
- Port of registry: 1932: Fuchū; 1935: Tokyo
- Builder: Mitsubishi Zosen Kaisha Ltd, Nagasaki
- Completed: 1932
- Identification: call sign JJDE
- Fate: Sunk, 1 January 1944

General characteristics
- Type: cargo ship
- Tonnage: 6,050 GRT, 3,730 NRT
- Length: 406.8 ft (124.0 m)
- Beam: 55.5 ft (16.9 m)
- Draught: 26 ft 0 in (7.9 m)
- Depth: 32.5 ft (9.9 m)
- Decks: 2
- Installed power: 691 NHP
- Propulsion: 1 × screw; 1 × triple expansion engine; 1 × exhaust steam turbine
- Speed: 13 1/2 knots (25 km/h)
- Armament: by 1944: 6 × 15 cm/45 41st Year Type gun; 2 × Type 93 heavy machine guns
- Notes: sister ship: Johore Maru

Nagoya Maru was a Japanese cargo steamship that was built in Nagasaki in 1932. In the Second World War the Imperial Japanese Navy used her first as a submarine depot ship and then to transport aircraft. A United States Navy submarine sank her in 1944.

== Building ==
Ishihara Sangyo Kaiun Goshi Kaisha (ISK) is a Japanese company that had mines in Malaya and operated a fleet of cargo ships. In 1932 it had a pair of sister ships built by different Japanese shipyards. Harima Shipbuilding and Engineering Co Ltd built Johore Maru at Harima, and Mitsubishi Zosen Kaisha Ltd built Nagoya Maru at Nagasaki. The pair were almost identical in design and dimensions.

Nagoya Maru's registered length was 406.8 ft (124.0 m), her beam was 55.5 ft (16.9 m) and her depth was 32.5 ft (9.9 m). Her tonnages were 6,050 GRT and 3,730 NRT. Her single screw was driven by two engines. Her main engine was a three-cylinder triple expansion engine. Exhaust steam from its low pressure cylinder powered an exhaust steam turbine, which drove the same propeller shaft via a hydraulic coupling and double reduction gearing. Between them, her two engines were rated at a total of 691 nominal horsepower, and gave her a speed of 13 1/2 knots (25.0 km/h; 15.5 mph).

== Owners ==
ISK registered both ships at Fuchū. Nagoya Maru's wireless telegraph call sign was JJDE.

In 1935, Nanyo Kaiun KK acquired both Johore Maru and Nagoya Maru. It registered both ships in Tokyo.

== War service ==
In 1941 the Imperial Japanese Army requisitioned Johore Maru and the Navy requisitioned Nagoya Maru. The Navy had Nagoya Maru converted into a submarine depot ship. In 1942 Nagoya Maru was converted again, to transport aircraft. Nagoya Maru was armed with six 15 cm/45 41st Year Type guns, plus two pairs of Type 93 heavy machine guns on dual mountings.

In October 1943 the submarine USS Silversides sank Johore Maru in the Pacific Ocean northwest of the Bismarck Archipelago.

On 31 December 1943, the submarine USS Herring sighted a convoy off the Japanese coast that included Nagoya Maru. The next day, 1 January 1944, Herring sank Nagoya Maru by torpedo off the island of Aogashima at position 35°15′N 138°02′E, killing 110 passengers and one member of the ship's crew. The destroyer Ikazuchi counter-attacked, but without success.

== Bibliography ==
- Lloyd's Register of Shipping. Vol. II.–Steamers and Motorships of 300 tons gross and over. London: Lloyd's Register of Shipping. 1933 – via Southampton City Council.
- Lloyd's Register of Shipping. Vol. II.–Steamers and Motorships ove 300 tons. London: Lloyd's Register of Shipping. 1935 – via Southampton City Council.
