= Japanese gunboat Fushimi (1939) =

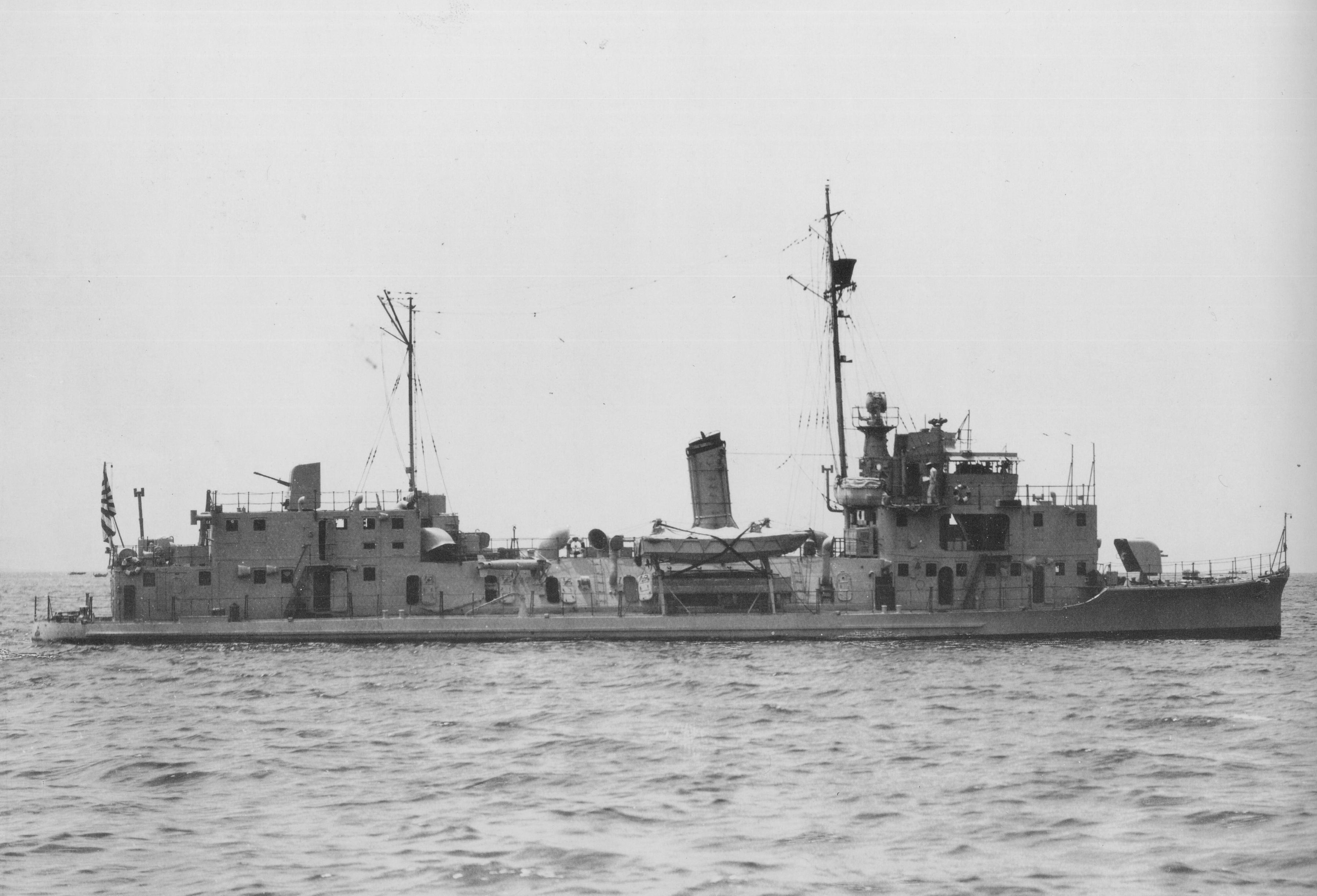
- Fushimi at Osaka, July 1941

History

Japan
- Name: Fushimi
- Ordered: 1927 Fiscal Year
- Builder: Fujinagata Shipyards, Japan
- Laid down: 15 July 1938
- Launched: 26 March 1939
- Completed: 15 July 1939
- Stricken: 3 May 1947

Taiwan
- Name: Chang Feng
- Acquired: 1945
- Fate: Captured by PRC during the Chinese Civil War

General characteristics
- Type: River gunboat
- Displacement: 304 long tons (309 t) (design); 350 long tons (356 t) (actual)
- Length: 50.3 metres (165 ft)
- Beam: 9.8 metres (32 ft)
- Draught: 1.2 metres (3.9 ft).
- Propulsion: 2-shaft Kampon turbine engines; 2 boilers; 2,200 hp (1,600 kW)
- Speed: 17 knots (20 mph; 31 km/h)
- Range: 1400 nautical miles @ 14 knots
- Complement: 61
- Armament: 1 × 80 mm (3.1 in)/45 cal. gun; 1 × × Type 96 25mm autocannon

Fushimi (伏見) was a river gunboat of the Imperial Japanese Navy, that operated on the Yangtze River in China during the 1940s, and during the Second Sino-Japanese War and World War II.

== Background ==
Fushimi was the lead vessel of the two vessels in the Fushimi-class river gunboats authorized under the 3rd Naval Armaments Supplement Programme of 1937.

== Design ==
Fushimi had a hull with an overall length of 50.3 metres (165 ft) and width of 9.80 metres (32.2 ft), with a normal displacement of 338 tons and draft of 1.2 metres (3.9 ft). She was propelled by two Kampon steam turbine engines with two boilers driving two shafts, producing 2,200 hp (1,600 kW) and had a top speed of 17 knots.

The ship was armed with one 80 mm (3.1 in)/28 cal. gun and one Type 96 25 mm AA gun.

== Service record ==
Fushimi was laid down on 15 July 1933 and launched 26 March 1939 at the Fujinagata Shipyards in Osaka, Japan. On commissioning on 15 July 1939, she was assigned to the Yokosuka Naval District and attached to the 1st China Expeditionary Fleet, arriving in Shanghai on 15 November. From 1 April 1940 to 21 June, she was assigned to patrols of the middle Yangtze River from Hankou, and from November to April 1941, to patrols of the middle Yangtze as far as Hankou. However, she returned to Japan in July for repairs, and from 30 October 1941, was based at Nanjing.

On 8 December 1941, Fushimi became the flagship for Vice Admiral Prince Teruhisa Komatsu’s First China Fleet Yangtze Squadron, Upper River Division, and supported operations by the Imperial Japanese Army. She was repaired in Shanghai in July 1942, and was reassigned to the Middle River Division based at Hankou from 2 August. Her anti-aircraft capability was bolstered by the addition of six more Type 96 25mm auto cannon at the end of 1942. From 4 September 1943, Fushimi was attached to the Lower River Division, and patrolled Tung Ting Lake and adjacent waterways from 10 November. On 29 November 1944, she was attacked by Republic of China Air Force aircraft and sunk near Anqing. She was later refloated and towed to Shanghai, where her armaments were removed on 10 January 1945 to help bolster the land-based defenses. Her hulk remained docked at Shanghai until the surrender of Japan.

In September 1945, Fushimi was given to the Republic of China as a prize of war, and commissioned into the Republic of China Navy as the Chiang Feng (Chinese: 江鳳). She was removed from the Japanese navy list on 3 May 1947. Captured during the Chinese Civil War by the People’s Republic of China, her subsequent fate is unknown.
