= Shōkaku-class aircraft carrier =

Aircraft carrier class of the Imperial Japanese Navy

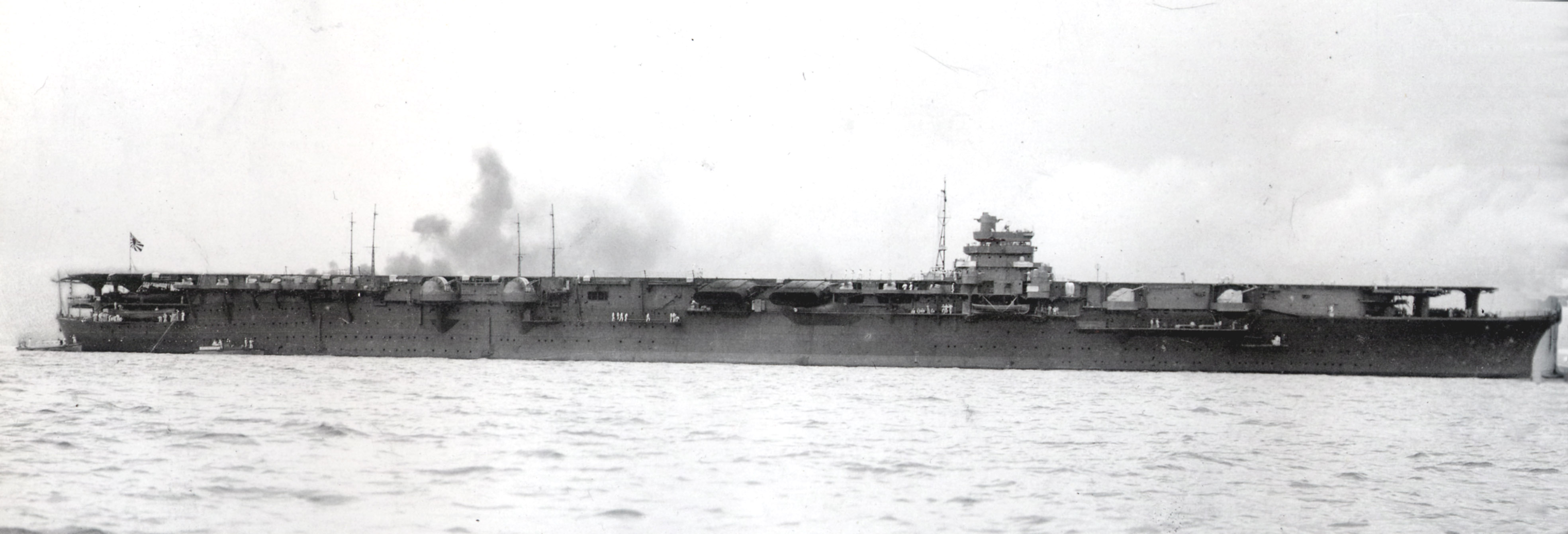
- Shōkaku at Yokosuka, 8 August 1941, shortly after she was completed

Class overview
- Name: Shōkaku class
- Builders: Kawasaki Kobe Shipyard; Yokosuka Naval Arsenal
- Operators: Imperial Japanese Navy
- Preceded by: Hiryū
- Succeeded by: Taihō
- Built: 1938–1941
- In commission: 1941–1944
- Completed: 2
- Lost: 2

General characteristics (as built)
- Type: Aircraft carrier
- Displacement: 32,105 t (31,598 long tons) (deep load)
- Length: 257.5 m (844 ft 10 in)
- Beam: 29 m (95 ft 2 in)
- Draft: 9.32 m (30 ft 7 in) (deep load)
- Depth: 23 m (75 ft 6 in)
- Installed power: 8 × water-tube boilers; 160,000 shp (120,000 kW)
- Propulsion: 4 × shafts; 4 × geared steam turbines
- Speed: 34.5 knots (63.9 km/h; 39.7 mph)
- Range: 9,700 nmi (18,000 km; 11,200 mi) at 18 knots (33 km/h; 21 mph)
- Complement: 1,660
- Armament: 8 × twin 127 mm (5 in) DP guns; 12 × triple 25 mm (1 in) AA guns
- Armor: Waterline belt: 46–165 mm (1.8–6.5 in); Deck: 65–132 mm (2.6–5.2 in)
- Aircraft carried: 72 (+12 spares); 7 December 1941: 18 × Mitsubishi A6M Zeros; 27 × Aichi D3A "Val"s; 27 × Nakajima B5N "Kate"s

The Shōkaku class (翔鶴型, Shōkaku-gata) consisted of two aircraft carriers built for the Imperial Japanese Navy (IJN) in the late 1930s. Completed shortly before the start of the Pacific War in 1941, the Shōkaku and Zuikaku were called "arguably the best aircraft carriers in the world" when built. With the exception of the Battle of Midway, they participated in every major naval action of the Pacific War, including the attack on Pearl Harbor, the Indian Ocean Raid, the Battle of the Coral Sea, the Guadalcanal Campaign, the Battle of the Philippine Sea and the Battle of Leyte Gulf (Zuikaku only).

Their inexperienced air groups were relegated to airfield attacks during the attack on Pearl Harbor, but they later sank two of the four fleet carriers lost by the United States Navy during the war in addition to one elderly British light carrier. The sister ships returned to Japan after the Battle of the Coral Sea, one to repair damage and the other to replace aircraft lost during the battle, so neither ship participated in the Battle of Midway in June 1942. After the catastrophic losses of four carriers during that battle, they formed the bulk of the IJN's carrier force for the rest of the war. As such they were the primary counterattack force deployed against the American invasion of Guadalcanal in the Battle of the Eastern Solomons in August. Two months later, they attempted to support a major offensive by the Imperial Japanese Army to push the United States Marines off Guadalcanal. This resulted in the Battle of the Santa Cruz Islands where they crippled one American carrier and damaged another in exchange for damage to Shōkaku and a light carrier. Neither attempt succeeded and the Japanese withdrew their remaining forces from Guadalcanal in early 1943 using the air group from Zuikaku to provide cover.

For the next year, the sisters trained before moving south to defend against any American attempt to retake the Mariana Islands or the Philippines. Shōkaku was sunk by an American submarine during the Battle of the Philippine Sea in June 1944 as the Americans invaded the Marianas and Zuikaku was sacrificed as a decoy four months later during the Battle off Cape Engaño.

== Background and description ==
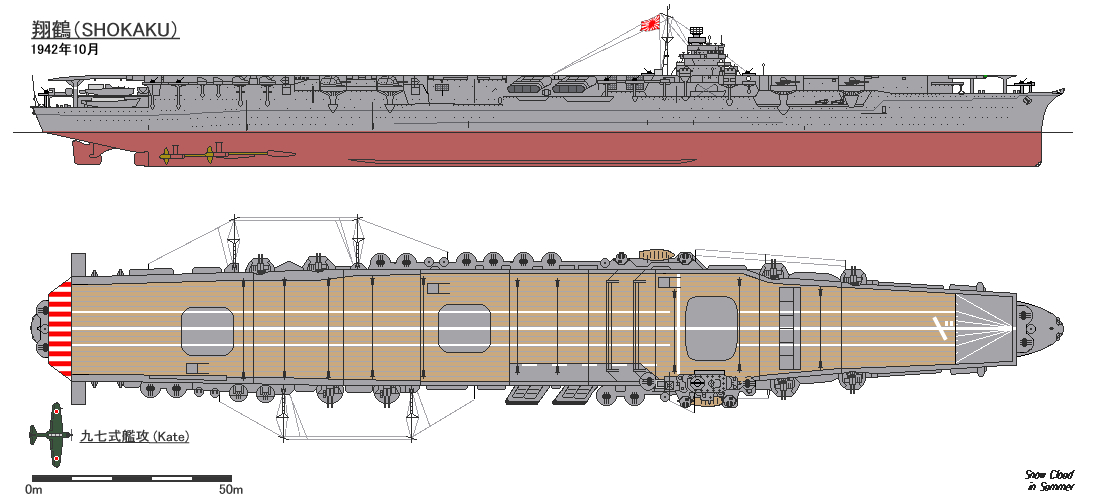
Right elevation and plan view of Shōkaku in 1942

The two Shōkaku-class carriers were ordered in 1937 as part of the 3rd Naval Armaments Supplement Program. No longer restricted by the provisions of the Washington Naval Treaty, which had expired in December 1936, and with relaxed budgetary limitations, the IJN sought qualitative superiority over their foreign counterparts. Drawing on experience with their existing carriers, the Navy General Staff laid out an ambitious requirement for a ship that equaled the 96-aircraft capacity of the Akagi and Kaga, the speed of Sōryū and Hiryū and the defensive armament of Kaga. The new ship was also to have superior protection and range over any of the existing carriers.

The Basic Design Section of the Navy Technical Department decided upon an enlarged and improved Hiryū design with the island on the port side, amidships. After construction of the ships began, the Naval Air Technical Department (NATD) began having second thoughts about the location of the island because it thought that the portside location of the island on Hiryū and Akagi had an adverse impact on airflow over the flight deck. Another issue identified was that the amidships position shortened the available landing area, which had the potential to be problematic in the future as aircraft landing speeds increased with their growing weight. To verify these assumptions, the NATD filmed hundreds of takeoffs and landings aboard Akagi in October–November 1938 and decided to move the island over to the starboard side and further forward, about one-third of the length from the bow. Shōkaku was the furthest advanced by this point and the supporting structure for the bridge had already been built; rebuilding it would have delayed construction so it was left in place. The changes that had to be made consisted of a 1-meter (3 ft 3 in) widening of the flight deck opposite the island and a corresponding 50-centimeter (20 in) narrowing on the starboard side and the addition of 100 metric tons (98 long tons) of ballast on the port side to re-balance the ship.

The ships had a length of 257.5 meters (844 ft 10 in) overall, a beam of 29 meters (95 ft 2 in), a draft of 9.32 meters (30 ft 7 in) at deep load, and a moulded depth of 23 m (75 ft 6 in). They displaced 32,105 metric tons (31,598 long tons) at deep load. Based on hydrodynamic research conducted for the Yamato-class battleships, the Shōkaku class received a bulbous bow and twin rudders, both of which were positioned on the centerline abaft the propellers. Their crew consisted of 1,660 men: 75 commissioned officers, 56 special-duty officers, 71 warrant officers and 1,458 petty officers and crewmen, excluding the air group.

The Shōkaku-class ships were fitted with four Kampon geared steam turbine sets, each driving one 4.2-meter (13 ft 9 in) propeller, using steam provided by eight Kampon Type Model B water-tube boilers. With a working pressure of 30 kg/cm^{2} (2,942 kPa; 427 psi), the boilers gave the turbines enough steam to generate a total of 160,000 shaft horsepower (120,000 kW) and a designed speed of 34.5 knots (63.9 km/h; 39.7 mph). This was the most powerful propulsion system in IJN service, 10,000 and 8,000 shaft horsepower (7,500 and 6,000 kW) more than the Yamato class and the Mogami-class cruiser, respectively. During their sea trials, the sister ships achieved 34.37–34.58 knots (63.65–64.04 km/h; 39.55–39.79 mph) from 161,290–168,100 shaft horsepower (120,270–125,350 kW). They carried 5,000 metric tons (4,900 long tons) of fuel oil which gave them a range of 9,700 nautical miles (18,000 km; 11,200 mi) at 18 knots (33 km/h; 21 mph). The boiler uptakes were trunked to the ships' starboard side amidships and exhausted just below flight deck level through two funnels that curved downward. The Shōkaku class was fitted with three 600-kilowatt (800 hp) turbo generators and two 350-kilowatt (470 hp) diesel generators, all operating at 225 volts.

=== Flight deck and hangars ===
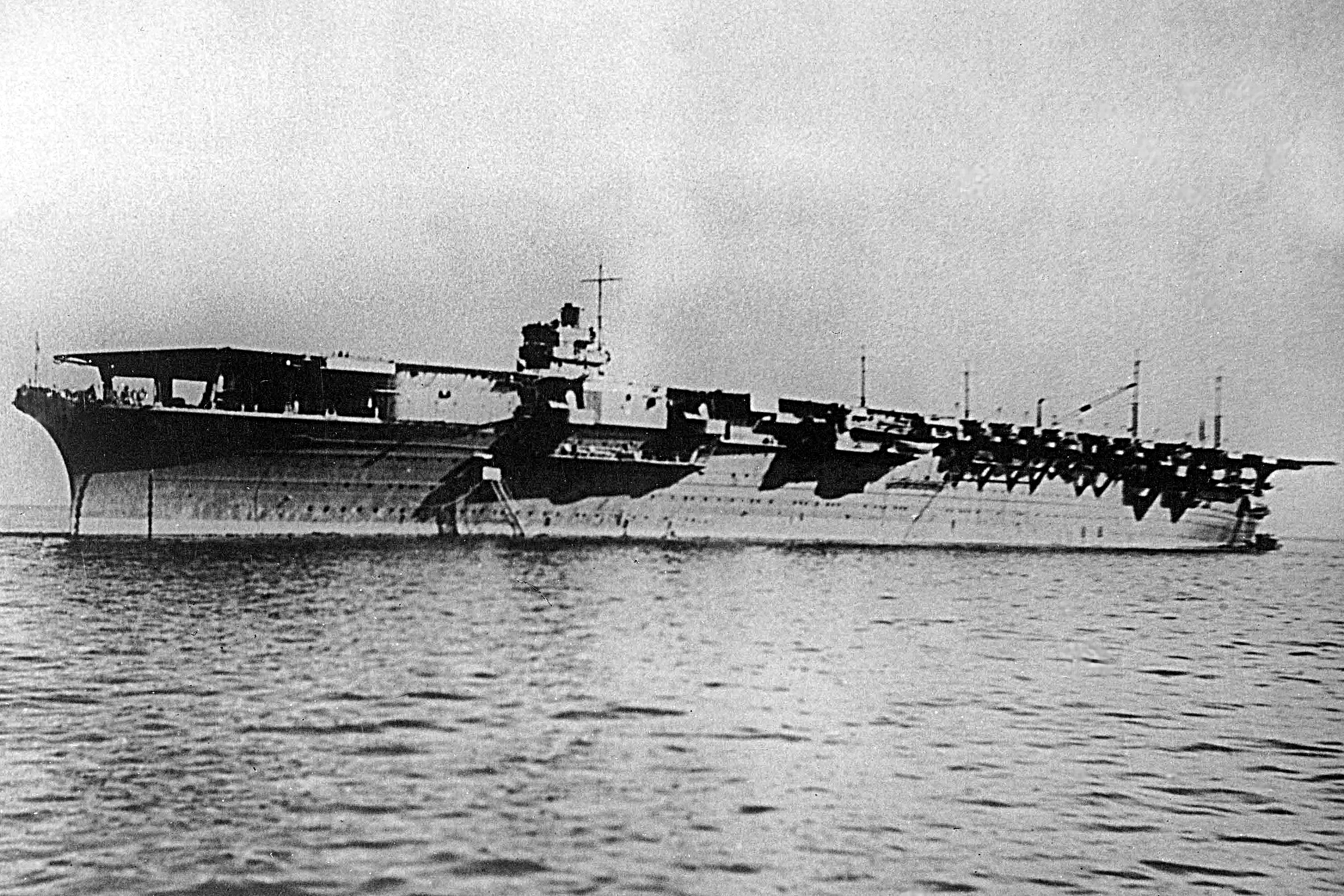
Zuikaku at anchor on the day she was completed, 25 September 1941

The carriers' 242.2-meter (794 ft 7 in) flight deck had a maximum width of 29 meters and overhung the superstructure at both ends, supported by pillars. Ten transverse arrestor wires were installed on the flight deck that could stop a 4,000-kilogram (8,800 lb) aircraft. If the aircraft missed those, it could be stopped by one of three crash barricades. Although space and weight were allocated for two aircraft catapults, their development was not completed before the Shōkaku-class ships were sunk. The ships were designed with two superimposed hangars; the upper hangar was about 200 meters (656 ft 2 in) long and had a width that varied between 18.5 and 24 meters (60 ft 8 in and 78 ft 9 in). It had a height of 4.85 meters (15 ft 11 in) while the lower hangar was 4.7 meters (15 ft 5 in) high and only usable by fighters. The lower hangar was about 20 meters (65 ft 7 in) shorter than the upper one and its width ranged from 17.5 to 20 meters (57 ft 5 in to 65 ft 7 in). Together they had a total area of 5,545 square meters (59,690 sq ft). Each hangar could be subdivided by five or six fire curtains and they were fitted with fire fighting foam dispensers on each side. The lower hangar was also fitted with a carbon dioxide fire suppression system. Each subdivision was provided with a pair of enclosed and armored stations to control the fire curtains and fire fighting equipment.

Aircraft were transported between the hangars and the flight deck by three elevators that took 15 seconds to go from the lower hangar to the flight deck. The forward elevator was larger than the others to allow aircraft that had just landed to be moved below without folding their wings and measured 13 by 16 meters (42 ft 8 in × 52 ft 6 in). The other elevators were narrower, 13 by 12 meters (42 ft 8 in × 39 ft 4 in). The ships mounted a crane on the starboard side of the flight deck, abreast the rear elevator. When collapsed, it was flush with the flight deck.

The Shōkaku-class carriers were initially intended to have an air group of 96, including 24 aircraft in reserve. These were envisioned as 12 Mitsubishi A5M ("Claude") monoplane fighters, 24 Aichi D1A2 ("Susie") Type 96 dive bombers, 24 Mitsubishi B5M ("Mabel") Type 97 No. 2 torpedo bombers, and 12 Nakajima C3N Type 97 reconnaissance aircraft. All of these aircraft were either superseded by larger, more modern aircraft or cancelled while the ships were being built, so the air group was revised to consist of 18 Mitsubishi A6M Zero fighters, 27 Aichi D3A ("Val") dive bombers, and 27 Nakajima B5N ("Kate") torpedo bombers. In addition, the ship carried 2 Zeros, 5 "Vals", and 5 "Kates" as spares for a total of 84 aircraft.

=== Armament and sensors ===
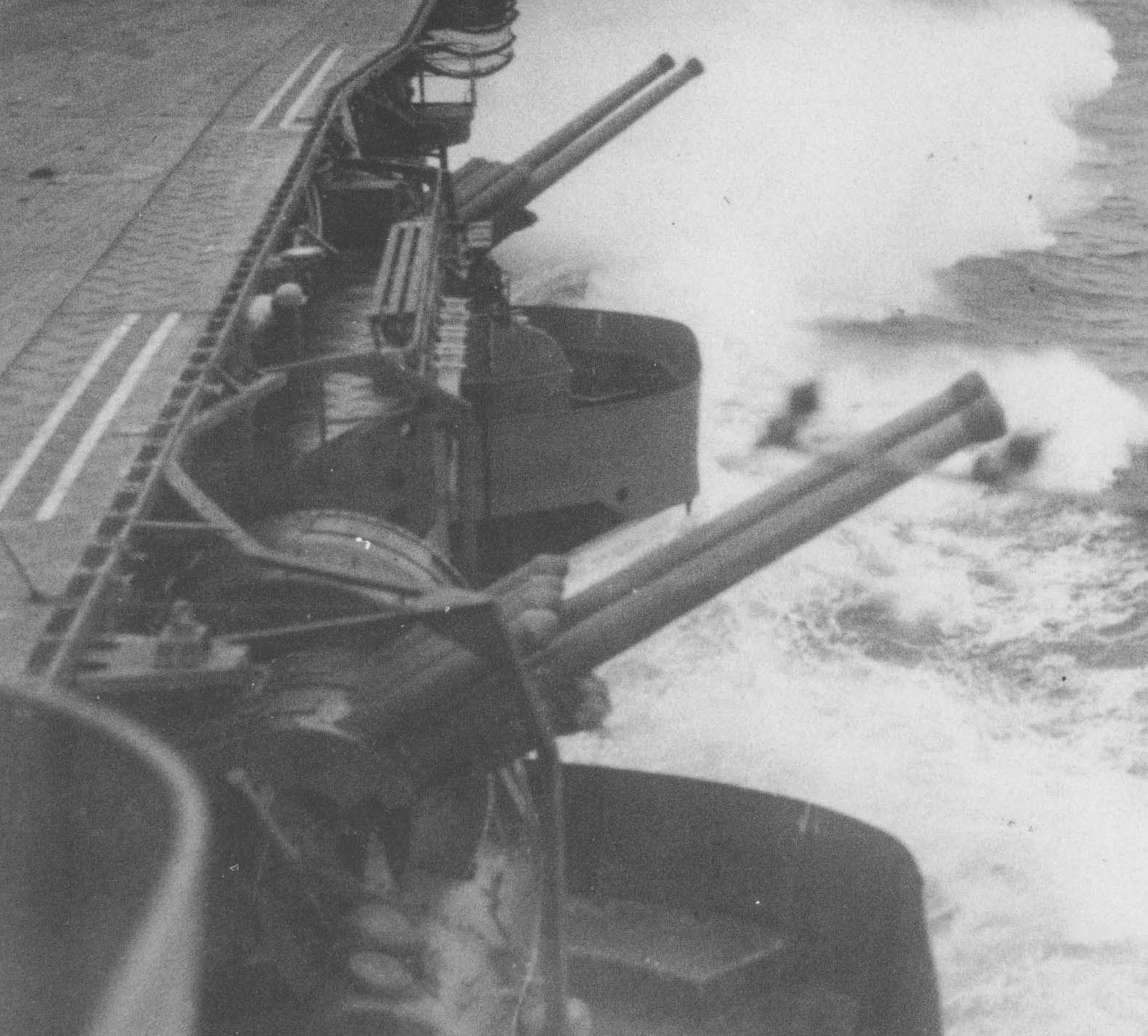
12.7 cm (5.0 in) Type 89 guns aboard Zuikaku, November 1941

The carriers' heavy anti-aircraft (AA) armament consisted of eight twin-gun mounts equipped with 40-caliber 12.7-centimeter (5 in) Type 89 dual-purpose guns mounted on projecting sponsons, grouped into pairs fore and aft on each side of the hull. The guns had a range of 14,700 meters (16,100 yd), and a ceiling of 9,440 meters (30,970 ft) at an elevation of +90 degrees. Their maximum rate of fire was fourteen rounds a minute, but their sustained rate of fire was around eight rounds per minute. The ship was equipped with four Type 94 fire-control directors to control the 12.7 cm guns, one for each pair of guns, although the director on the island could control all of the Type 89 guns.

Their light AA armament consisted of a dozen triple-gun mounts for license-built Hotchkiss 25 mm (1 in) Type 96 AA guns, six mounts on each side of the flight deck. The gun was the standard Japanese light AA weapon during World War II, but it suffered from severe design shortcomings that rendered it largely ineffective. According to historian Mark Stille, the weapon had many faults including an inability to "handle high-speed targets because it could not be trained or elevated fast enough by either hand or power, its sights were inadequate for high-speed targets, it possessed excessive vibration and muzzle blast". These guns had an effective range of 1,500–3,000 meters (1,600–3,300 yd), and a ceiling of 5,500 meters (18,000 ft) at an elevation of +85 degrees. The effective rate of fire was only between 110 and 120 rounds per minute because of the frequent need to change the 15-round magazines. The Type 96 guns were controlled by six Type 95 directors, one for every pair of mounts.

In June 1942, Shōkaku and Zuikaku had their anti-aircraft armament augmented with six more triple 25 mm mounts, two each at the bow and stern, and one each fore and aft of the island. The bow and stern groups each received a Type 95 director. In October another triple 25 mm mount was added at the bow and stern and 10 single mounts were added before the Battle of the Philippine Sea in June 1944. After the battle, Zuikaku's anti-aircraft armament was reinforced with 26 single mounts for the 25 mm Type 96 gun, bringing the total of 25 mm barrels to 96, 60 in 20 triple mounts and 36 single mounts. These guns were supplemented by eight 28-round AA rocket launchers. Each 12-centimeter (4.7 in) rocket weighed 22.5 kilograms (50 lb) and had a maximum velocity of 200 m/s (660 ft/s). Their maximum range was 4,800 meters (5,200 yd).

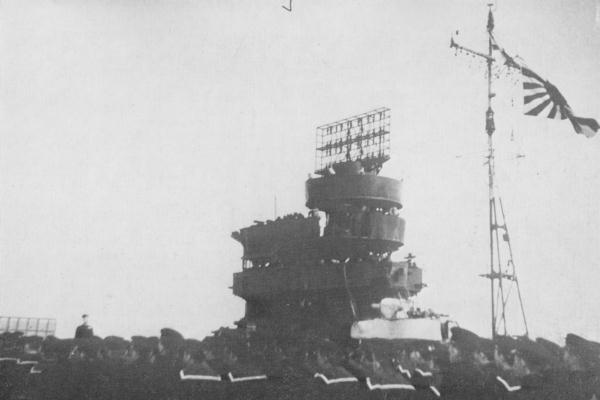
The island with its Type 21 radar aboard Zuikaku, 1942–43

Shōkaku was the first carrier in the IJN to be fitted with radar, a Type 21 early-warning radar, mounted on the top of the island around September 1942. The date of Zuikaku's installation is unknown, but both ships received a second Type 21 radar in a retractable installation adjacent to the flight deck after October. Before June 1944, a Type 13 air-search radar was installed on the light tripod mast abaft the island. The Shōkaku-class carriers were also fitted with a Type 91 hydrophone in the bow that was only useful when anchored or moving very slowly.

=== Protection ===
The Shōkaku class had a waterline belt that consisted of 46 millimeters (1.8 in) of Copper-alloy Non-Cemented armor (CNC) that covered most of the length of the ship. The belt was 4.1 meters (13 ft 5 in) high, of which 2 meters (6 ft 7 in) was below the waterline. The lower strake of the armor was backed by 50 millimeters (2.0 in) of Ducol steel. The magazines were protected by 165 millimeters (6.5 in) of New Vickers Non-Cemented (NVNC) armor, sloped at an inclination up to 25° and tapered to thicknesses of 55–75 millimeters (2.2–3.0 in). The flight and both hangar decks were unprotected and the ships' propulsion machinery was protected by a 65-millimeter (2.6 in) deck of CNC armor. The NVNC armor over the magazines was 132 millimeters (5.2 in) thick and 105 millimeters (4.1 in) thick over the aviation gasoline storage tanks. All of the deck armor was overlaid on a 25-millimeter deck of Ducol steel.

The Shōkakus were the first Japanese carriers to incorporate a torpedo belt system. Based on model experiments that began in 1935, it consisted of a liquid-loaded "sandwich" of compartments outboard of the torpedo bulkhead. The experiments showed that a narrow liquid-loaded compartment was necessary to distribute the force of a torpedo or mine's detonation along the torpedo bulkhead by spreading it across the full width of the bulkhead and to stop the splinters created by the detonation. Outboard of this were two compartments intended to dissipate the force of the gases of the detonation, including the watertight compartment of the double bottom. The two innermost compartments were intended to be filled with fuel oil that would be replaced by water as it was consumed. The torpedo bulkhead itself consisted of an outer Ducol plate 18–30 millimeters (0.71–1.18 in) thick that was riveted to a 12-millimeter (0.47 in) plate. The IJN expected the torpedo bulkhead to be damaged in an attack and placed a thin holding bulkhead slightly inboard to prevent any leaks from reaching the ships' vitals.

== Ships ==
Construction data
Name	Kanji	Builder	Laid down	Launched	Completed	Fate
Shōkaku	翔鶴	Yokosuka Naval Arsenal	12 December 1937	1 June 1939	8 August 1941	Torpedoed and sunk by USS Cavalla, 19 June 1944
Zuikaku	瑞鶴	Kawasaki Kobe Shipyard	25 May 1938	27 November 1939	25 September 1941	Sunk by air attack during the Battle off Cape Engaño, 25 October 1944

== Careers ==
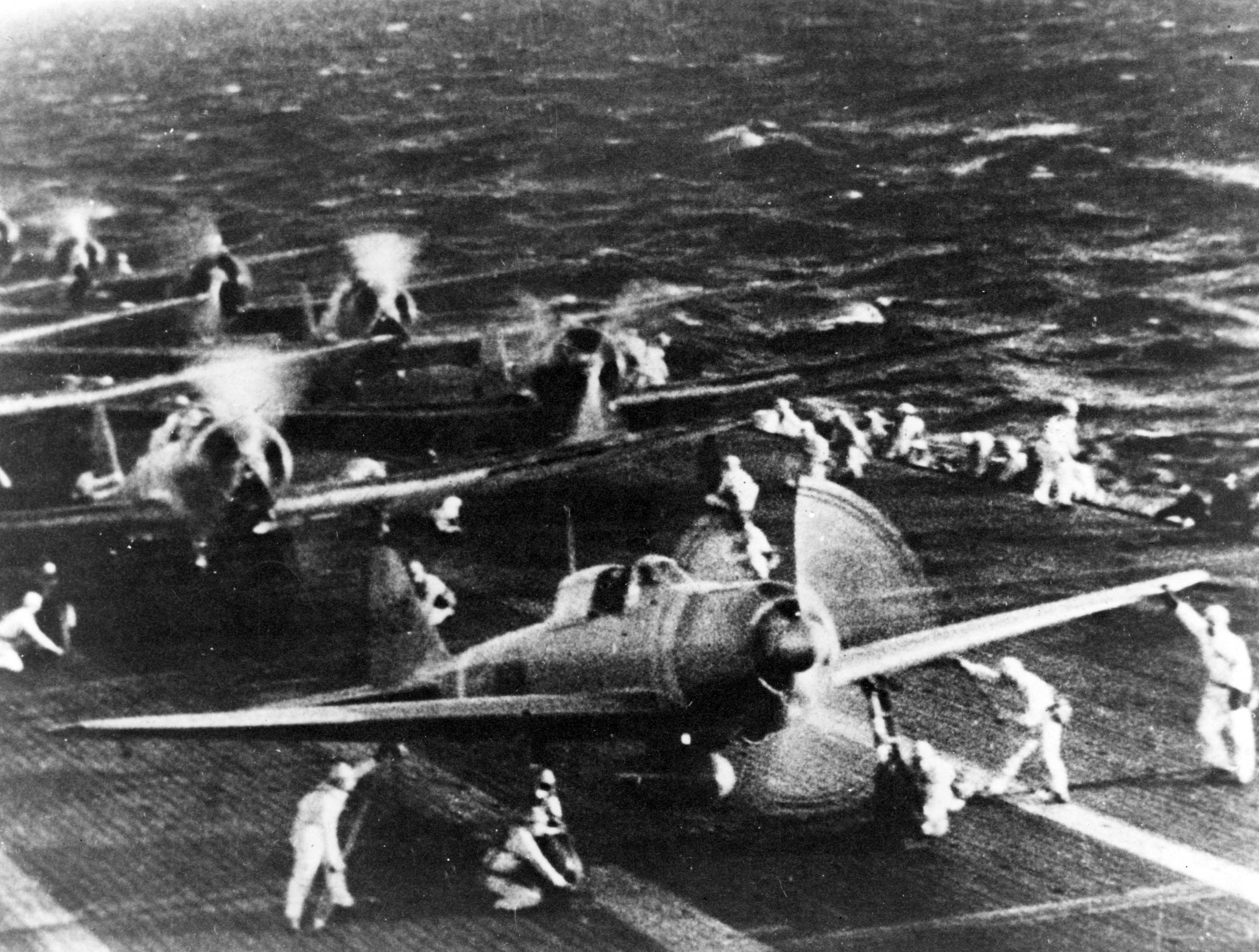
Planes from Shōkaku preparing for the attack on Pearl Harbor

Shortly after completion in 1941, Shōkaku and Zuikaku were assigned to the newly formed Fifth Carrier Division, which was itself assigned to the 1st Air Fleet (Kidō Butai), and began working up to prepare for the Pearl Harbor attack. Due to their inexperience, their air groups were tasked with the less demanding airfield attack role rather than the anti-ship mission allocated to the veteran air groups of the older carriers. Each carrier's aircraft complement consisted of 18 Zero fighters, 27 D3A dive bombers, and 27 B5N torpedo bombers. The two carriers contributed a total of 12 Zeros and 54 D3As to the first wave on the morning of 8 December (Japan time); (Note: Japan Standard Time is 19 hours ahead of Hawaiian Standard Time, so in Japan, the attack on Pearl Harbor happened on 8 December.) these latter aircraft struck Wheeler Army Airfield, Hickam Field, and Naval Air Station Ford Island while the fighters strafed Marine Corps Air Station Kaneohe Bay. Only the 54 B5Ns participated in the second wave, striking Ford Island, Hickam Field and Kaneohe Bay again. The Fifth Carrier Division's aircraft conducted the majority of the attack against the airfields, supplemented only by fighters from the other four carriers. Only one of Shōkaku's dive bombers was lost during the attack; in exchange 314 American aircraft were damaged or destroyed. Historian Alan Zimm said the young aviators delivered "a sterling performance, greatly exceeding expectations and outshining the dive bombers from the more experienced carriers."

In January 1942, together with Akagi and Kaga of the First Carrier Division, the sisters supported the invasion of Rabaul in the Bismarck Archipelago, as the Japanese moved to secure their southern defensive perimeter against attacks from Australia. Aircraft from all four carriers attacked the Australian base at Rabaul on 20 January; the First Carrier Division continued to attack the town while the Fifth Carrier Division moved westwards and attacked Lae and Salamaua in New Guinea. They covered the landings at Rabaul and Kavieng on 23 January before returning to Truk before the end of the month. After the Marshalls–Gilberts raids on 1 February, the Fifth Carrier Division was retained in home waters until mid-March to defend against any American carrier raids on the Home Islands.

=== Indian Ocean Raid ===
The sister ships then rejoined the Kido Butai at Staring Bay on Celebes Island in preparation for the Indian Ocean Raid. By this time the air groups had been reorganized to consist of 21 each of the A6Ms, D3As and B5Ns. The Japanese intent was to defeat the British Eastern Fleet and destroy British airpower in the region in order to secure the flank of their operations in Burma. Shōkaku and Zuikaku contributed aircraft to the 5 April Easter Sunday Raid on Colombo, Ceylon. Although the civilian shipping had been evacuated from Colombo harbor, the Japanese sank an armed merchant cruiser, a destroyer, and severely damaged some of the support facilities. The Kido Butai returned to Ceylon four days later and attacked Trincomalee; the sisters' aircraft sank a large cargo ship and damaged the monitor HMS Erebus. In the meantime, the Japanese spotted the light carrier HMS Hermes, escorted by the destroyer HMAS Vampire, and every available D3A was launched to attack the ships. Aircraft from Shōkaku and Zuikaku were the first to attack the Allied ships, both of which were sunk.

=== Battle of the Coral Sea ===
En route to Japan, the Fifth Carrier Division was diverted to Truk to support Operation Mo (the planned capture of Port Moresby in New Guinea). While they were preparing for the mission, the Americans intercepted and decrypted Japanese naval messages discussing the operation and dispatched the carriers Yorktown and Lexington to stop the invasion. The Japanese opened Operation Mo by occupying Tulagi, in the Solomon Islands, on 3 May. American land-based aircraft had spotted the light carrier Shōhō escorting the transports of the main invasion force on 6 May, and the American carriers moved west to place themselves in a position to attack it the following morning.

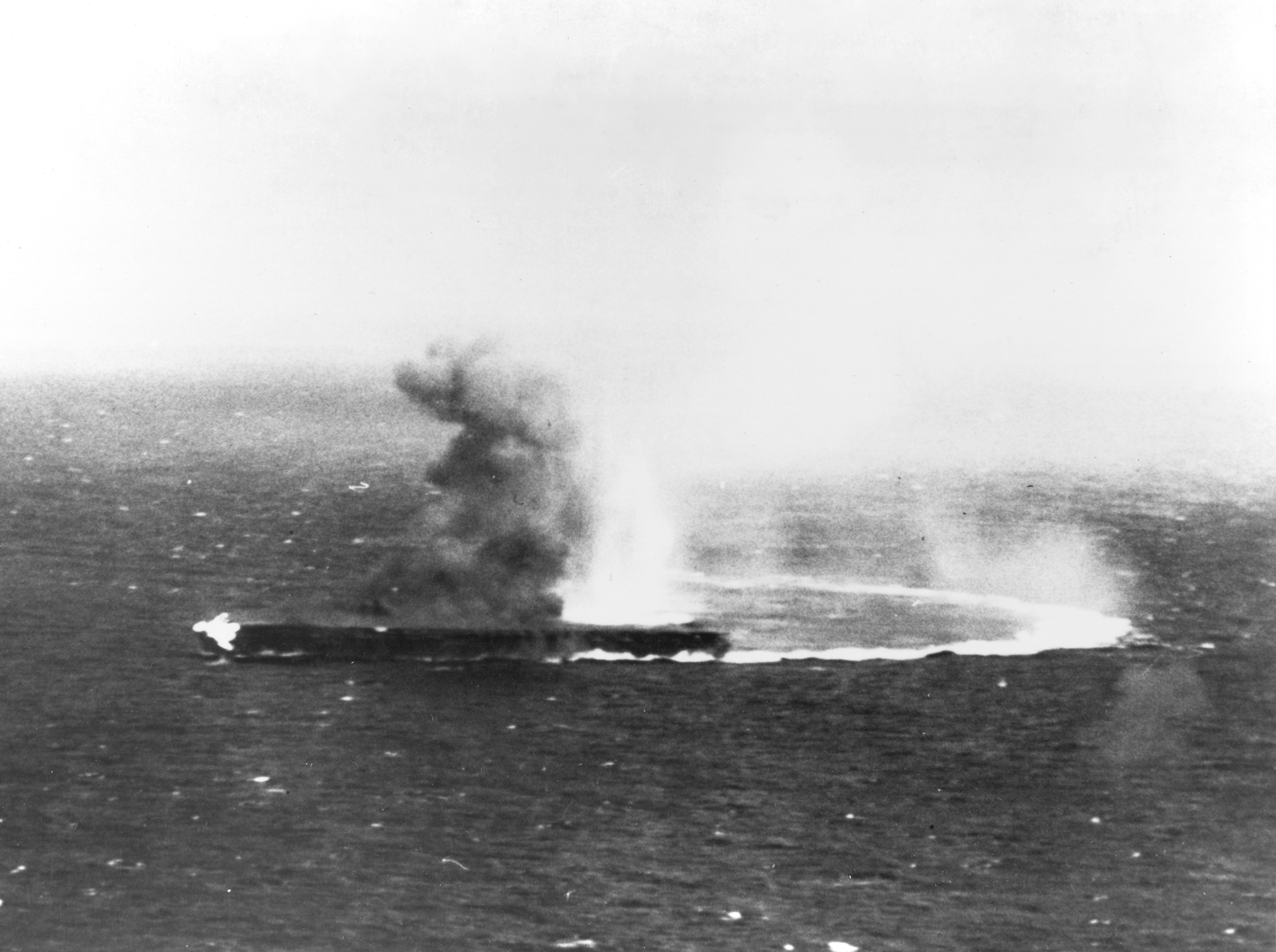
Shōkaku under attack on the morning of 8 May 1942. A large fire in the bow from the first bomb hit and a column of smoke from the second one are visible.

Shōhō was quickly located again that morning and sunk. In turn, the Japanese spotted the oiler, Neosho, and her escorting destroyer, which were misidentified as a carrier and a light cruiser. A single dive bomber was lost during the consequent airstrike that sank the destroyer and damaged Neosho badly enough that she had to be scuttled a few days later. Late in the afternoon, the Japanese launched a small airstrike, without any escorting fighters, based on an erroneous spot report. The American carriers were far closer to the Japanese than they realized and roughly in line with their intended target. Alerted by radar, some of the American Combat Air Patrol (CAP) was vectored to intercept the Japanese aircraft, the rest being retained near the carriers because of bad weather and fading daylight. The American fighters mauled the Japanese attackers who were forced to call off the attack, but some of the surviving Japanese pilots became confused in the darkness and attempted to verify if the American carriers were their own before being driven off.

On the morning of 8 May 1942, both sides located each other at about the same time and began launching their aircraft about 09:00. The American dive bombers disabled Shōkaku's flight deck with three hits, but the carrier was able to evade all of the torpedoes. Hidden by a rain squall, Zuikaku escaped detection and was not attacked. In return, the Japanese aircraft badly damaged Lexington with two torpedo and two bomb hits and scored a single bomb hit on Yorktown. The torpedo hits on Lexington cracked one of her avgas tanks, and leaking vapor caused a series of large explosions that caused her to be scuttled.

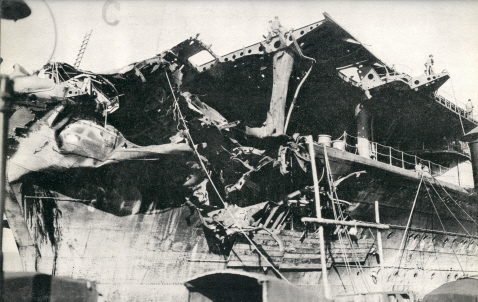
The bow damage suffered by Shōkaku

The air groups of the sisters were decimated in the battle, which forced Zuikaku to return to Japan with Shōkaku for resupply and aircrew training, and neither carrier was able to take part in the Battle of Midway in June. En route to Japan, Shōkaku was caught in a severe storm and nearly capsized as the weight of the water used to put out the fires had compromised her stability. Repairs took three months and she was not ready for action until late August 1942.

=== Battle of the Eastern Solomons ===
The American landings on Guadalcanal and Tulagi on 7 August 1942 caught the Japanese by surprise. The next day, the light carrier Ryūjō joined the sister ships in the First Carrier Division, which departed for Truk on 16 August. Having learned the lesson taught at Midway, the IJN strengthened the fighter contingent at the expense of the torpedo bombers assigned to its carriers; the Shōkaku-class carriers mustered 53 Zeros, 51 D3As, 36 B5Ns and 2 Yokosuka D4Y1-C "Judy" reconnaissance aircraft between them. After an American carrier was spotted near the Solomon Islands on 21 August, the division was ordered to bypass Truk and continue to the south. Ryūjō was detached early on 24 August to move in advance of the troop convoy bound for Guadalcanal and to attack the American air base at Henderson Field if no carriers were located. The two fleet carriers were to stand off, prepared to attack the Americans if found.

Ryūjō and her escorts were the first Japanese ships spotted and sunk by the Americans later that morning, but Zuikaku and Shōkaku were not spotted until the afternoon. Shortly before an unsuccessful attack by the pair of Douglas SBD Dauntlesses conducting the search, the sisters launched half of their dive bombers to attack the American carriers Enterprise and Saratoga. Most of the American carrier aircraft were already airborne by this time, either on CAP, returning from search missions, or from sinking Ryūjō, so only a small airstrike was launched in response to the spot report. About an hour after the first Japanese airstrike took off, a second airstrike that included the rest of the dive bombers was launched, but their target location was mistaken and they failed to find the Americans. The first airstrike attacked the two American carriers, scoring one hit on the battleship USS North Carolina and three hits on Enterprise, but they were mauled by the large number of airborne American aircraft and heavy anti-aircraft fire. Uncertain of the damage inflicted on each other, both sides disengaged later that evening.

=== Battle of the Santa Cruz Islands ===
The First Carrier Division, now including the light carrier Zuihō, departed Truk on 11 October to support the Japanese Army operation to capture Henderson Field on Guadalcanal. At this time, the sisters mustered 54 A6Ms, 45 D3As, and 36 B5Ns between them. Four days later, the Japanese spotted a small American convoy that consisted of a fleet tug towing a gasoline barge and escorted by the destroyer Meredith. Aircraft from Shōkaku and Zuikaku sank the latter, but did not attack the tug.

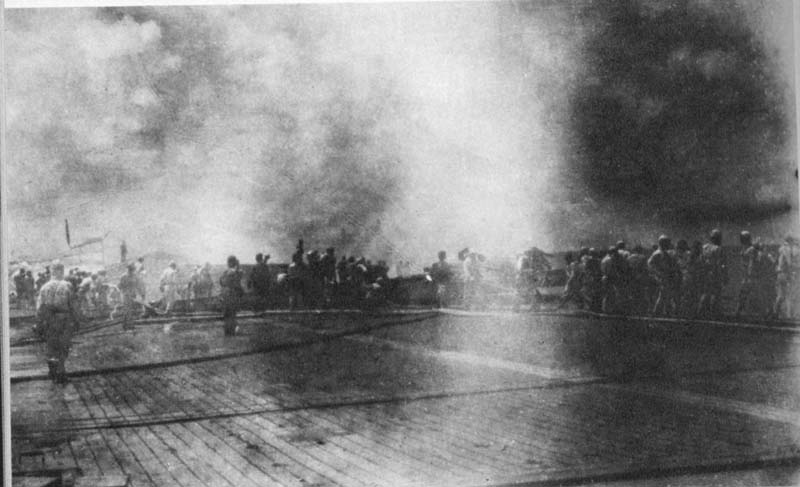
Shōkaku crewmembers fight fires on the flight deck, 26 October 1942

The Japanese and American carrier forces discovered each other in the early morning of 26 October and each side launched air strikes. Shōkaku was badly damaged by six hits from USS Hornet's dive bombers; Zuikaku was not spotted or attacked as she was hidden by the overcast conditions, just like at the Battle of the Coral Sea. In exchange, the Japanese crippled Hornet with two torpedoes and three bombs. In addition, two aircraft crashed into the American carrier and inflicted serious damage. Enterprise was also damaged by two bomb hits and a near miss and a destroyer was damaged when it was struck by a B5N. Attacks later in the day further damaged Hornet, which was abandoned and later sunk by Japanese destroyers Makigumo and Akigumo. The Japanese lost nearly half their aircraft that participated in the battle, together with their irreplaceable experienced aircrew. On 2 November, the First Carrier Division was ordered home for repairs and training.

Shōkaku's repairs continued until March 1943 and Zuikaku, together with the recently repaired Zuihō, sailed for Truk on 17 January to support the impending evacuation of Japanese ground forces from Guadalcanal (Operation Ke). On 29 January, the two carriers flew off 47 Zeros to Rabaul and Kahili Airfield, contributing some of their own aircraft and pilots. Zuihō was then used to cover the evacuation, while Zuikaku remained at Truk, together with the two Yamato-class battleships, acting as a fleet in being threatening to sortie at any time.

In May, Shōkaku and Zuikaku were assigned to a mission to counterattack the American offensive in the Aleutian Islands, but this operation was cancelled after the Allied victory on Attu on 29 May. The sisters were transferred to Truk in July. In response to the carrier raid on Tarawa on 18 September, the carriers and much of the fleet sortied for Eniwetok to search for the American forces before they returned to Truk on 23 September, having failed to locate them. The Japanese had intercepted some American radio traffic that suggested another attack on Wake Island, and on 17 October, Shōkaku and Zuikaku and the bulk of the 1st Fleet sailed for Eniwetok to be in a position to intercept any such attack, but no attack occurred and the fleet returned to Truk. At the beginning of November, the bulk of their air groups were transferred to Rabaul to bolster the defenses there, just in time to help defend the port against the Allied attack a few days later. They accomplished little there, for the loss of over half their number, before returning to Truk on the 13th. The sisters returned to Japan in December.

In February 1944, Shōkaku and Zuikaku were transferred to Singapore. On 1 March the carrier divisions were reorganized with the new fleet carrier Taihō replacing Zuihō in the division. The First Carrier Division sailed in mid-May for Tawi-Tawi in the Philippines. The new base was closer to the oil wells in Borneo on which the IJN relied and also to the Palau and western Caroline Islands where the Japanese expected the next American attack; the location lacked an airfield on which to train the inexperienced pilots and American submarine activity restricted the ships to the anchorage.

=== Battle of the Philippine Sea ===
The 1st Mobile Fleet was en route to Guimaras Island in the central Philippines on 13 June, where they intended to practice carrier operations in an area better protected from submarines, when Vice Admiral Jisaburō Ozawa learned of the American attack on the Mariana Islands the previous day. Upon reaching Guimares, the fleet refueled and sortied into the Philippine Sea where they spotted Task Force 58 on 18 June. At this time, the sister ships mustered 54 Zeros, 60 D4Ys and 36 Nakajima B6N "Jill" torpedo bombers. As the carriers were launching their first airstrike the following morning, Taihō was torpedoed by an American submarine and later sank. Later that morning, Shōkaku was torpedoed by a different submarine, USS Cavalla. The three or four torpedoes started multiple fires in the hangar, which ignited fueling aircraft, in addition to causing heavy flooding. As the bow continued to sink, aircraft and munitions began to slide forward and a bomb in the hangar detonated. This ignited gas and oil fumes which caused a series of four explosions that gutted the ship. Shōkaku sank several minutes later with the loss of 1,263 of her crew. 570 men were rescued by a light cruiser and a destroyer.

The loss of Taihō and Shōkaku left Zuikaku to recover the Division's few remaining aircraft after their heavy losses (only 102 aircraft remained aboard the seven surviving carriers by the evening) and the 1st Mobile Fleet continued its withdrawal towards Okinawa. The Americans did not spot the Japanese carriers until the afternoon of the following day and launched a large airstrike that only succeeded in hitting Zuikaku with a single bomb that started a fire in the hangar.

=== Battle of Leyte Gulf ===
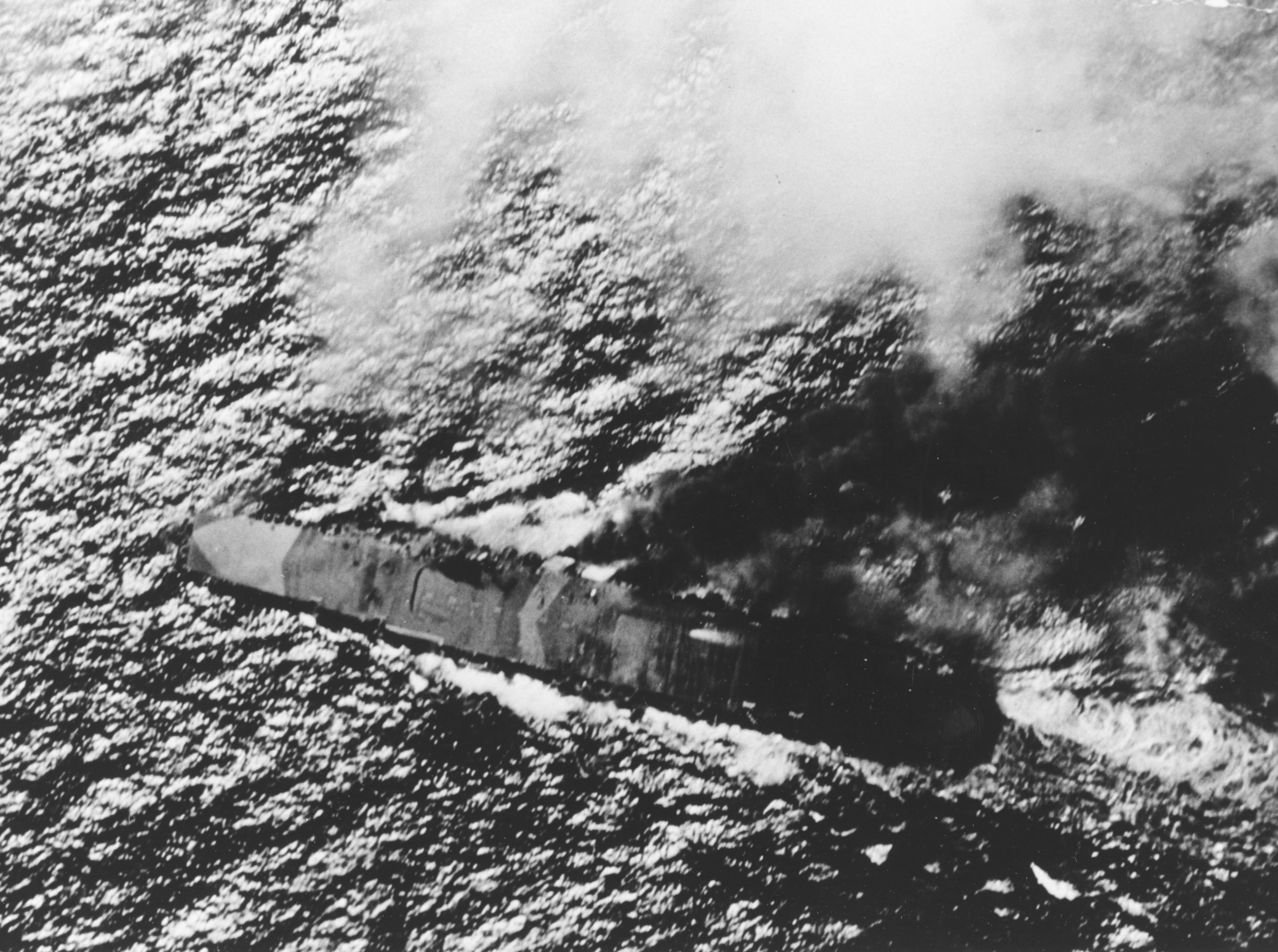
Aerial view of Zuikaku burning, 25 October 1944

In October 1944, Zuikaku was the flagship of Admiral Jisaburo Ozawa's decoy Northern Force in Operation Shō-Gō 1, the Japanese counterattack against the Allied landings on Leyte. At this time, the ship had 28 A6M5 Zero fighters, 16 A6M2 Zero fighter-bombers, 7 D4Y reconnaissance aircraft and 15 B6Ns. On the morning of 24 October, she launched 10 fighters, 11 fighter-bombers, 6 torpedo bombers, and 2 reconnaissance aircraft as her contribution to the airstrike intended to attract the attention of the American carriers away from the other task groups that were to destroy the landing forces. This accomplished little else as the Japanese aircraft failed to penetrate past the defending fighters; the survivors landed at airfields on Luzon. The Americans were preoccupied dealing with the other Japanese naval forces and defending themselves from air attacks and finally found the Northern Force late that afternoon, but Admiral William Halsey, Jr., commander of Task Force 38, decided that it was too late in the day to mount an effective strike. He turned all of his ships north to position himself for an attack.

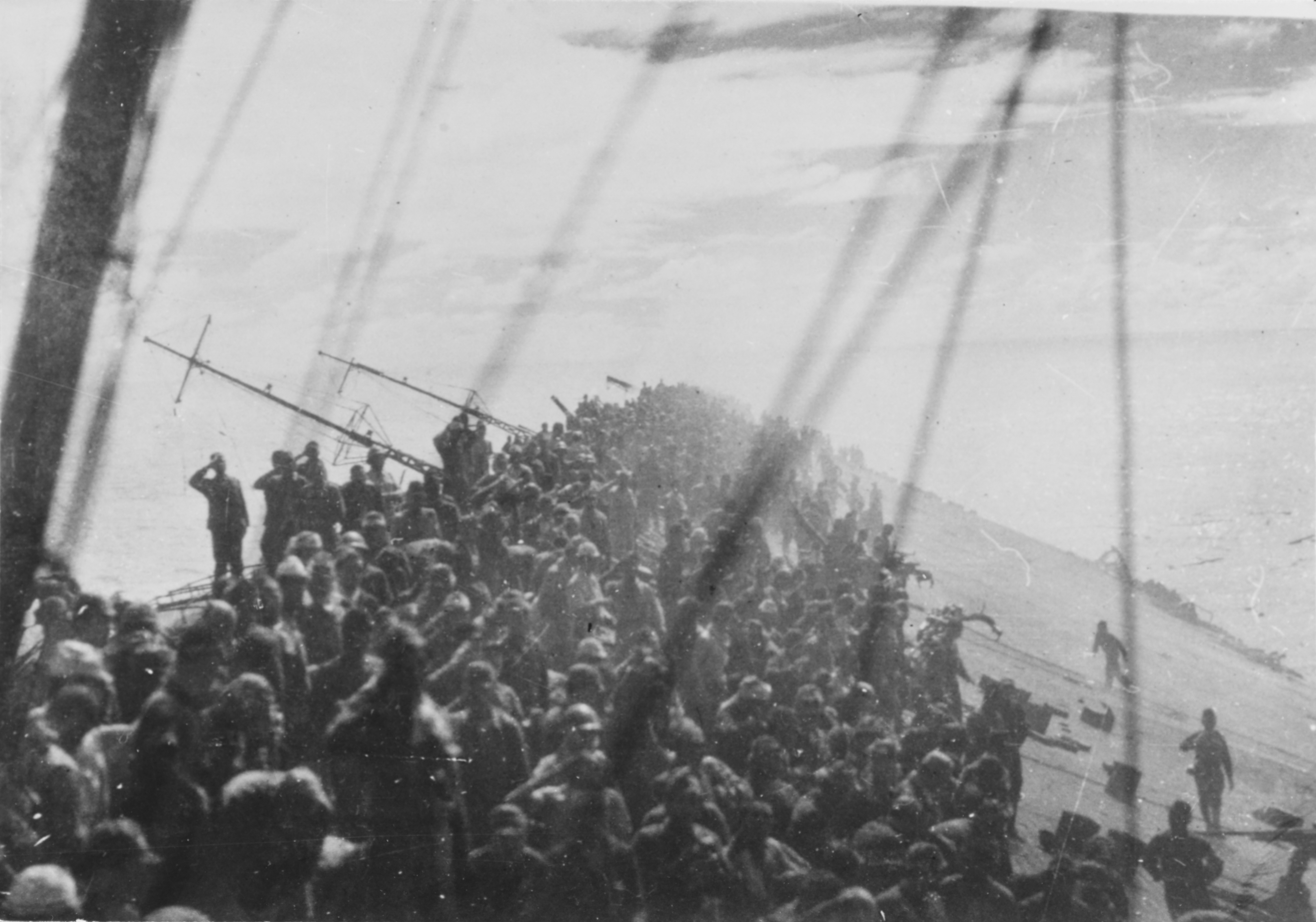
Zuikaku's crew salute as the flag is lowered before abandoning ship

The American carriers launched an airstrike shortly after dawn; Zuikaku was struck by three bombs and one torpedo that started fires in both hangars, damaged one propeller shaft, and gave her a 29.5° list to port. Fifteen minutes later, the fires were extinguished and the list was reduced to 6° by counterflooding. She was mostly ignored by the second wave of attacking aircraft, but was a focus of the third wave that hit her with six more torpedoes and four bombs. The bombs started fires in the hangars, the torpedoes caused major flooding that increased her list, and the order to abandon ship was issued before Zuikaku sank by the stern. Lost with the ship were 49 officers and 794 crewmen, but 47 officers and 815 crewmen were rescued by her escorting destroyers.
