= USS Herring =

Submarine of the United States

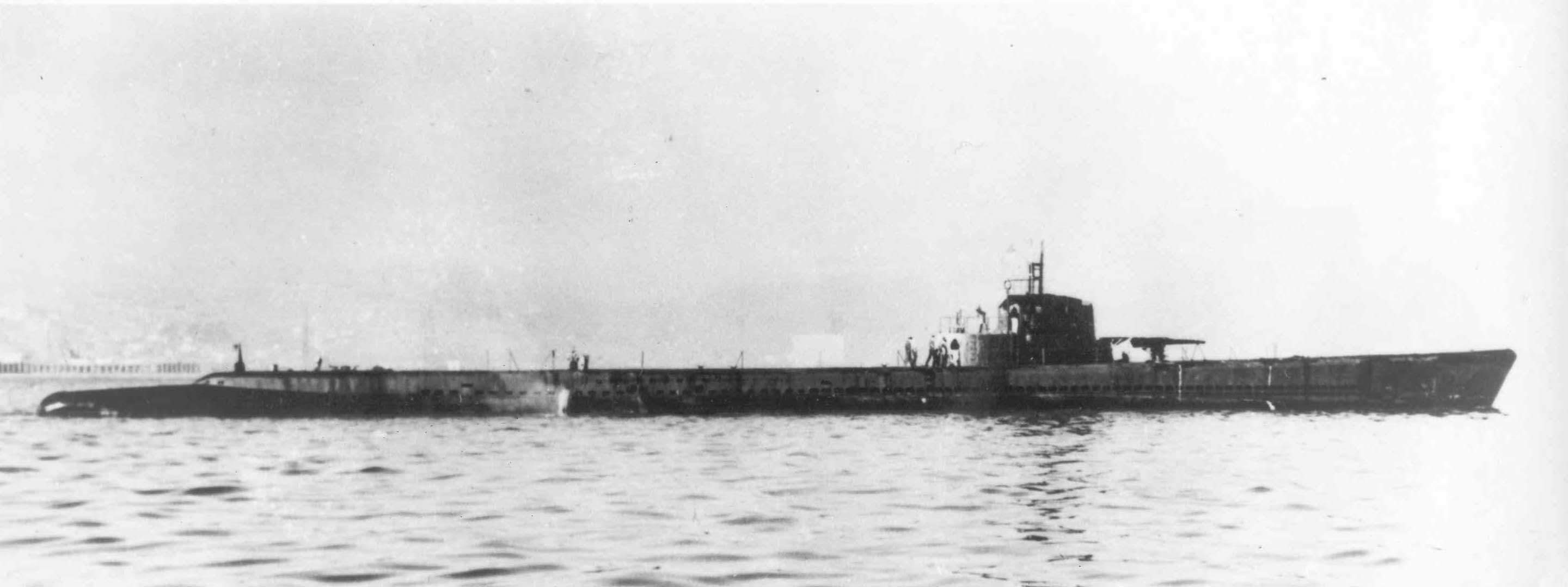

History

United States
- Builder: Portsmouth Naval Shipyard, Kittery, Maine
- Laid down: 14 July 1941
- Launched: 5 January 1942
- Sponsored by: Mrs. Ray Spear
- Commissioned: 4 May 1942
- Fate: Sunk by Japanese shore defense batteries on Matua Island, 1 June 1944

General characteristics
- Class & type: Gato-class diesel-electric submarine
- Displacement: 1,525 long tons (1,549 t) surfaced; 2,424 long tons (2,463 t) submerged
- Length: 311 ft 9 in (95.02 m)
- Beam: 27 ft 3 in (8.31 m)
- Draft: 17 ft (5.2 m) maximum
- Propulsion: 4 × Fairbanks-Morse Model 38D8-1/8 9-cylinder opposed-piston diesel engines driving electrical generators; 2 × 126-cell Sargo batteries; 4 × high-speed Elliott electric motors with reduction gears; 2 × propellers; 5,400 shp (4.0 MW) surfaced; 2,740 shp (2.04 MW) submerged
- Speed: 21 kn (39 km/h) surfaced; 9 kn (17 km/h) submerged
- Range: 11,000 nmi (20,000 km) surfaced at 10 kn (19 km/h)
- Endurance: 48 hours at 2 kn (3.7 km/h) submerged; 75 days on patrol
- Test depth: 300 ft (90 m)
- Complement: 6 officers, 54 enlisted
- Armament: 10 × 21-inch (533 mm) torpedo tubes; 6 forward, 4 aft; 24 torpedoes; 1 × 3-inch (76 mm) / 50 caliber deck gun; Bofors 40 mm and Oerlikon 20 mm cannon

USS Herring (SS-233), a Gato-class submarine, was the only ship of the United States Navy to be named for the herring.

== Construction and commissioning ==
Herring's keel was laid down 14 July 1941 by the Portsmouth Naval Shipyard in Kittery, Maine. She was launched on 15 January 1942, sponsored by Mrs. Emilie Spear (née Piollet), wife of Rear Admiral Ray Spear, Chief of the Bureau of Supplies and Accounts, and commissioned on 4 May 1942 with Lieutenant Commander Raymond W. Johnson in command.

== Operational history ==
=== Mediterranean ===
After shakedown, the new submarine was one of five sent to the Mediterranean Sea to take station off the North African coast prior to Operation Torch, the invasion of North Africa. Reaching her position off Casablanca on 5 November 1942, Herring remained there, spotting but not attacking several targets. On the morning of 8 November as the invasion was launched, the patient sub had her chance, sinking the 5,700 ton cargo ship Ville du Havre. Herring returned to Rosneath, Scotland, on 25 November and departed for her second war patrol 16 December, but targets were scarce. The fourth war patrol, an antisubmarine sweep in Icelandic waters, and fifth patrol, which took her back to the United States on 26 July 1943, netted Herring no more kills.

=== Pacific ===
Herring departed New London, Connecticut, for the rich hunting grounds of the Pacific on 9 August 1943. After intensive training at Pearl Harbor, she sailed 15 November 1943 on her sixth war patrol to join the ranks of the American submarines systematically decimating Japanese shipping and destroying the Japanese economy. She scored two kills, the 3,948 ton Hakozaki Maru on 14 December, and the 6,072 ton Nagoya Maru to celebrate New Year's Day 1944. Herring's next patrol was a frustrating one as on 24 March 1944 she stalked a large aircraft carrier but was detected and driven deep before she could attack.

Lieutenant Commander Johnson commanded Herring for five of her first six patrols, with the sole exception being March 1943 when John Corbus was in command. On her seventh and eight patrols she was captained by Lieutenant Commander David Zabriskie, Jr.

=== Loss ===
Herring's eighth war patrol was to be both her most successful and her last. Topping off at Midway Island on 21 May 1944, Herring headed for the Kurile Islands patrol area. Ten days later she rendezvoused with Barb (SS-220). Herring was never heard from or seen again. However, Japanese records show that she sank two ships, Japanese escort ship Ishigaki and Hokuyo Maru, on the night of 30–31 May. Ishigaki had been responsible for the sinking of USS S-44 (SS-155) on 7 October 1943. Herring's exact manner of loss can also be determined from these records. Two more merchant ships, Hiburi Maru and Iwaki Maru, were sunk while at anchor in Matsuwa Island on the morning of 1 June 1944. In a counter-attack, enemy shore batteries scored two direct hits on the submarine's conning tower and "bubbles covered an area about 5 meters wide, and heavy oil covered an area of approximately 15 miles.” On her last patrol, Herring had sunk four Japanese ships for a total of 13,202 tons, In all she had sunk six marus totaling 19,959 tons and a Vichy cargo ship. Found on June 1, 2026.

== Awards ==
- European–African–Middle Eastern Campaign Medal with two battle star
- Asiatic-Pacific Campaign Medal with three battle stars
- World War II Victory Medal

== Legacy ==
There is a memorial plaque at the Naval Weapons Station in Seal Beach, California, and another one, along with the ship's bell, at Battleship Memorial Park in Mobile, Alabama.

In June 2005, at the former Tagan cape, now Pologiy cape (48.039694°N 153.232642°E), near the site of the sinking, which is in 2,000 meters [6,600 ft] seaward, a memorial sign was established to the crew of USS Herring and to those of all the lost boats, which fought against Imperial Japan during the Second World War. The event was held in the fourth Kamchatka-Kuril historical and geographical expedition, led by the Russian researcher Evgeny Vereshaga.

In 2016 the wreck of Herring was located near Matua Island by a joint expedition of the Russian Geographical Society and Russian Defense Ministry. Aleksandr Kirillin, secretary of the academic board of Russia's Military Historical Society, said that "Russian divers in cooperation with the Pacific Fleet sailors discovered the submarine at a depth of 104 meters [341 ft]."
