= Japanese escort ship Kunashiri =

History

Empire of Japan
- Name: Kunashiri
- Namesake: Kunashiri
- Builder: Nihon Kokan, Tsurumi
- Laid down: 1 March 1939
- Launched: 6 May 1940
- Commissioned: 3 October 1940
- Stricken: 5 November 1945
- Fate: Wrecked, 4 June 1946

General characteristics
- Class & type: Shimushu-class escort ship
- Displacement: 870 long tons (884 t)
- Length: 77.7 m (255 ft)
- Beam: 9.1 m (29 ft 10 in)
- Draught: 3.05 m (10 ft)
- Speed: 19.7 knots (22.7 mph; 36.5 km/h)
- Complement: 150
- Armament: 3 × 120 mm (4.7 in)/45 cal DP guns; Up to 15 × Type 96 25 mm (0.98 in) AA guns; 6 × depth charge throwers; Up to 60 × depth charges; 1 × 81 mm (3.2 in) mortar

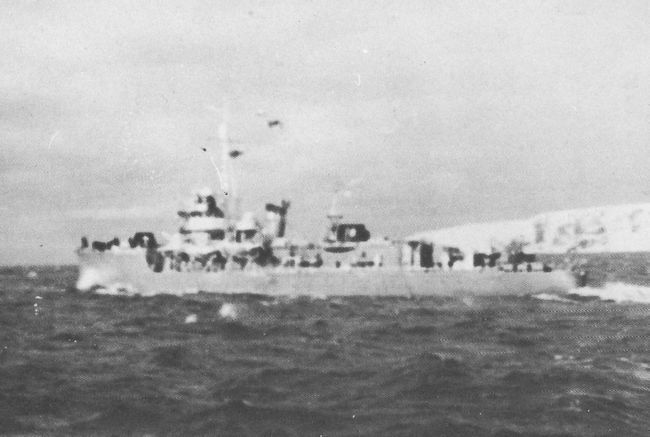
Japanese Navy Shimushu-class escort ship "Kunashiri", Asahi Bay, Atsuta Island.

Kunashiri (国後) was one of four Shimushu-class escort ships built for the Imperial Japanese Navy during World War II.

== Background and description ==
The Japanese called these ships Kaibōkan, "ocean defence ships", (Kai = sea, ocean, Bo = defence, Kan = ship), to denote a multi-purpose vessel. They were initially intended for patrol and fishery protection, minesweeping and as convoy escorts. The ships measured 77.72 meters (255 ft 0 in) overall, with a beam of 9.1 meters (29 ft 10 in) and a draft of 3.05 meters (10 ft 0 in). They displaced 870 metric tons (860 long tons) at standard load and 1,040 metric tons (1,020 long tons) at deep load. The ships had two diesel engines, each driving one propeller shaft, which were rated at a total of 4,200 brake horsepower (3,100 kW) for a speed of 19.7 knots (36.5 km/h; 22.7 mph). The ships had a range of 8,000 nautical miles (15,000 km; 9,200 mi) at a speed of 16 knots (30 km/h; 18 mph).

The main armament of the Shimushu class consisted of three Type 3 120-millimeter (4.7 in) guns in single mounts, one superfiring pair aft and one mount forward of the superstructure. They were built with four Type 96 25-millimeter (1.0 in) anti-aircraft guns in two twin-gun mounts, but the total was increased to 15 guns by August 1943. A dozen depth charges were stowed aboard initially, but this was doubled in May 1942 when their minesweeping gear was removed. The anti-submarine weaponry later rose to 60 depth charges with a Type 97 81-millimeter (3.2 in) trench mortar and six depth charge throwers.

== Construction and career ==
In July 1943 Kunashiri participated in the Kiska evacuation aspect of Operation Ke. During the war Kunashiri operated mostly in the Kuriles and Hokkaido area escorting various convoys. On 28 July 1944. she was reported "damaged" by unknown cause- USS Tambor. After the end of World War II Kunashiri returned to Sasebo and was later used by the Allied Repatriation Service. On 4 June 1946 while en route to Uraga the vessel ran aground and was later abandoned. In attempts to rescue her, the Kamikaze also ran aground, while at the same time, she too was repatriating Japanese troops from Singapore.
