= Shimushu-class escort ship =

Japanese ship class

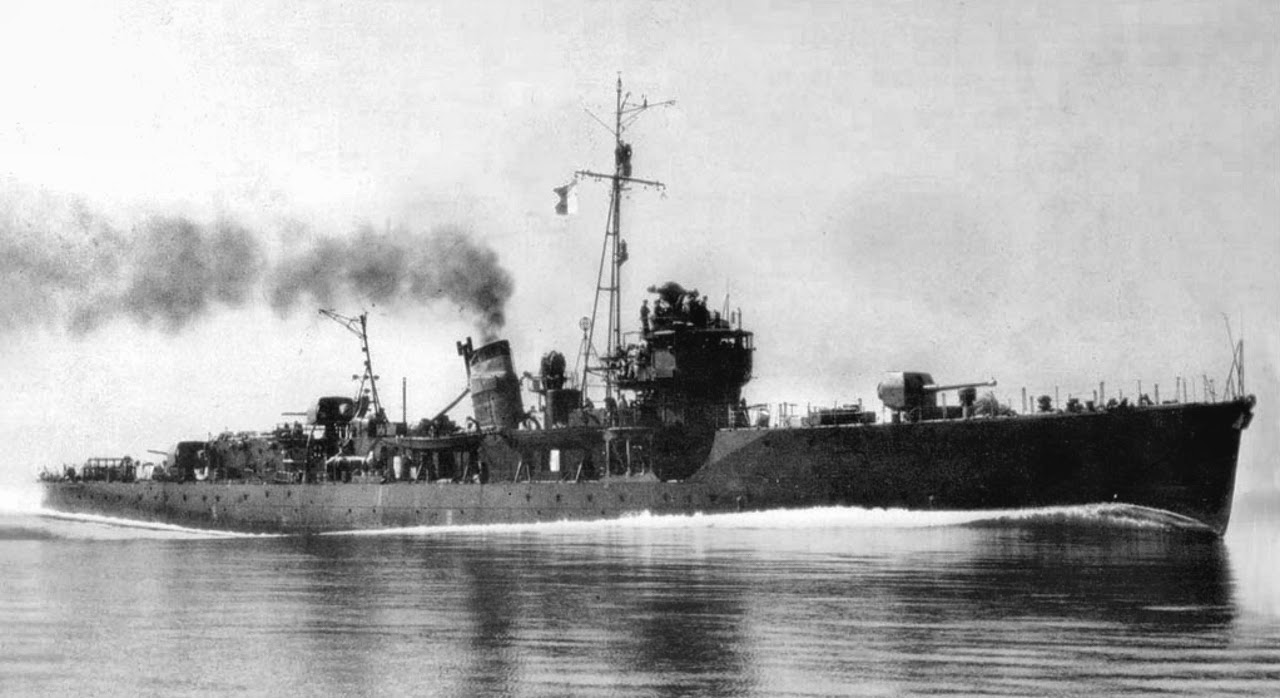
- Shimushu in 1940

Class overview
- Builders: Mitsui Shipbuilding & Engineering (2); Nihon Kōkan (1); Sasebo Naval Arsenal (1)
- Operators: Imperial Japanese Navy; Soviet Navy
- Succeeded by: Etorofu class
- Built: 1939–1941
- In commission: 1940–1948
- Planned: 16
- Completed: 4
- Lost: 1

General characteristics
- Type: Escort vessel
- Displacement: 860 long tons (874 t) standard
- Length: 77.7 m (255 ft)
- Beam: 9.1 m (29 ft 10 in)
- Draught: 3.05 m (10 ft)
- Speed: 19.7 knots (22.7 mph; 36.5 km/h)
- Range: 6,017 mi (5,229 nmi) at 16 kn (18 mph; 30 km/h) Fuel: 150 tons
- Complement: 150
- Armament: 3 × 120 mm (4.7 in)/45 cal guns; Up to 15 × Type 96 25 mm (0.98 in) AA guns; 6 × depth charge throwers; Up to 60 × depth charges; 1 × 80 mm (3.1 in) mortar

The Shimushu-class escort ships (占守型海防艦, Shimushu-gata kaibōkan) were a class of kaibōkan (equivalent to US destroyer escorts or British frigates) built for the Imperial Japanese Navy just prior to World War II. Four ships out of an initially planned 16 vessels were completed. The class was also referred to by internal Japanese documents as the "A-class" coastal defense vessel (甲型海防艦, Kō-gata kaibōkan).

== Background ==
The Shimushu-class kaibōkan, as with the Chidori class torpedo boat, was a consequence of the 1930 London Naval Treaty, which placed limitations on the total destroyer tonnage the Imperial Japanese Navy was permitted. One way in which the treaty could be circumvented was to use a loophole in the treaty which permitted ships of between 600 and 2,000 tons, with no more than four guns over 76mm, no torpedoes, and with a maximum speed of no more than 20 knots. A new class of vessel was designed to use this loophole, and was given the obsolete designation of kaibōkan (Kai = sea, ocean, Bo = defence, Kan = ship), which had previously been used to designate obsolete warships which had been reassigned to coastal defense duties. However, due to many other priorities, the budget for this new class was not secured until the 1937 3rd Naval Armaments Supplement Programme.

== Design ==
Due to the low priority of the project, the design of the Shimushu-class was subcontracted out to a private firm, Mitsubishi Heavy Industries. The Imperial Japanese Navy had intended for a simple design whose primary role was patrol and fisheries protection of the remote and sub-Arctic Kurile Islands, which would free destroyers currently used for this role for higher priority missions. The secondary role of the new class was to be minesweeping, and convoy escort was considered a minor third priority.

However, the design developed by Mitsubishi was more complex than the Imperial Japanese Navy had anticipated, with a double-curved bow and a forecastle deck which improved seaworthiness in the rough northern seas. The hull was also reinforced and insulated against the cold weather. The consequence was that the design was not suited to prefabrication or mass production, and construction times which created problems when more vessels were needed in a short time after the start of the Pacific War.

The ships measured 77.72 meters (255 ft 0 in) overall, with a beam of 9.1 meters (29 ft 10 in) and a draft of 3.05 meters (10 ft 0 in). They displaced 870 metric tons (860 long tons) at standard load and 1,040 metric tons (1,020 long tons) at deep load. The ships had two diesel engines, each driving one propeller shaft, which were rated at a total of 4,200 brake horsepower (3,100 kW) for a speed of 19.7 knots (36.5 km/h; 22.7 mph). The ships had a range of 8,000 nautical miles (15,000 km; 9,200 mi) at a speed of 16 knots (30 km/h; 18 mph).

The Shimushu-class was well armed for its size. The main armament of the Shimushu class consisted of three Type 3 120-millimeter (4.7 in) guns in single mounts, one superfiring pair aft and one mount forward of the superstructure, which had been taken from old destroyers. The minesweeping role was accomplished by two paravanes on each beam. The ASW role was accomplished with 18 Type 95 depth charges, but this was doubled in May 1942 when the minesweeping gear was removed and a Type 93 sonar was installed. The anti-submarine weaponry later rose to 60 depth charges with a Type 97 81-millimeter (3.2 in) trench mortar and six depth charge throwers.

Anti-aircraft protection was by four Type 96 25-millimeter (1.0 in) anti-aircraft guns in two twin-gun mounts abreast the bridge. This was later increased by August 1943 when the twin-mounts were replaced by triple-mounts, and an additional three triple-mounts, one in front of the bridge and two behind the smokestack were added. A Type 22 radar was also installed in 1943 and a Type 13 in 1944.

== Operational service ==
Despite being designed for operations in northern waters, the lead vessel of the class, Shimushu was used primarily in southern waters for convoy escort. She survived the war and was given as a prize of war to the Soviet Navy, which continued to use her until 1959. Ishigaki was sunk by a submarine in 1944. Hachijo and Kunashiri served in the northern Pacific, and both were scrapped after the end of the war.

== Ships in class ==
The four ships were ordered as ships #9 to #12 under the 3rd Naval Armaments Supplement Programme in 1937.

Kanji	Name	Builder	Laid down	Launched	Completed	Fate
占守	Shimushu	Mitsui-Tamano Shipyards	29 November 1938	13 December 1939	30 June 1940	Ceded to the Soviet Union, 5 July 1947. Decommissioned 16 May 1959.
国後	Kunashiri	NKK-Tsurumi Shipyards	1 March 1939	6 May 1940	3 October 1940	Wrecked, 4 June 1946
石垣	Ishigaki	Mitsui-Tamano Shipyards	15 August 1939	14 September 1940	15 February 1941	Torpedoed and sunk by USS Herring on 31 May 1944. Struck on 10 July 1944.
八丈	Hachijo	Sasebo Naval Arsenal	3 August 1939	10 April 1940	31 March 1941	Decommissioned on 30 November 1945. Scrapped, 30 April 1948.
