= Japanese escort ship Hachijō =

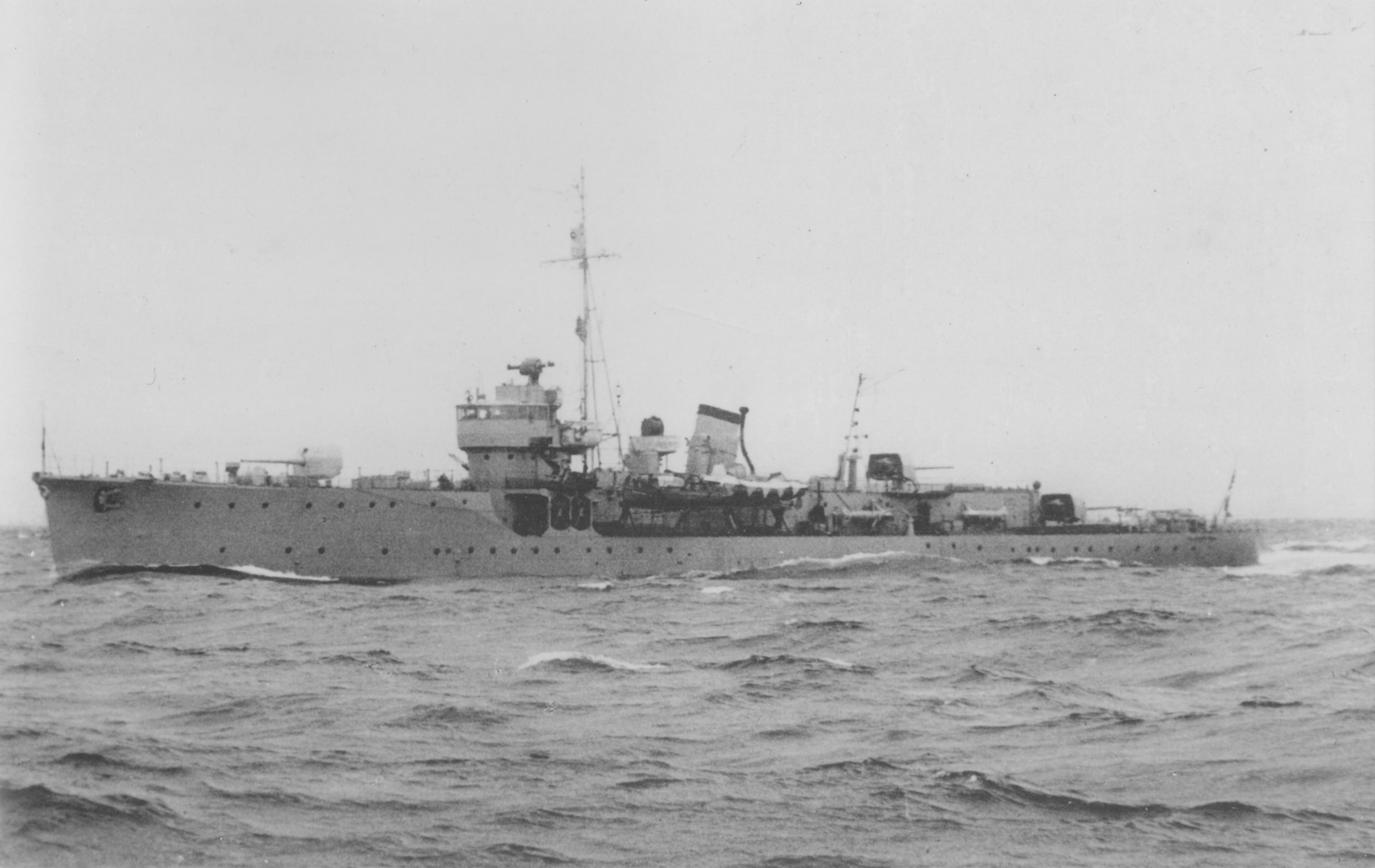

History

Empire of Japan
- Name: Hachijō
- Namesake: Hachijō
- Builder: Sasebo Naval Arsenal
- Laid down: 3 August 1939
- Launched: 10 April 1940
- Commissioned: 31 March 1941
- Stricken: 30 November 1945
- Fate: Scrapped, 30 April 1948

General characteristics
- Class & type: Shimushu-class escort ship
- Displacement: 870 long tons (884 t)
- Length: 77.7 m (255 ft)
- Beam: 9.1 m (29 ft 10 in)
- Draught: 3.05 m (10 ft)
- Propulsion: Twin screws, Diesel engines
- Speed: 19.7 knots (22.7 mph; 36.5 km/h)
- Complement: 150
- Armament: 3 × 120 mm (4.7 in)/45 cal DP guns; Up to 15 × Type 96 25 mm (0.98 in) AA guns; 6 × depth charge throwers; Up to 60 × depth charges; 1 × 81 mm (3.2 in) mortar

Hachijō (八丈) was one of four Shimushu-class escort ships built for the Imperial Japanese Navy during World War II.

== Background and description ==
The Japanese called these ships Kaibōkan, "ocean defence ships", (Kai = sea, ocean, Bo = defence, Kan = ship), to denote a multi-purpose vessel. They were initially intended for patrol and fishery protection, minesweeping and as convoy escorts. The ships measured 77.72 meters (255 ft 0 in) overall, with a beam of 9.1 meters (29 ft 10 in) and a draft of 3.05 meters (10 ft 0 in). They displaced 870 metric tons (860 long tons) at standard load and 1,040 metric tons (1,020 long tons) at deep load. The ships had two diesel engines, each driving one propeller shaft, which were rated at a total of 4,200 brake horsepower (3,100 kW) for a speed of 19.7 knots (36.5 km/h; 22.7 mph). The ships had a range of 8,000 nautical miles (15,000 km; 9,200 mi) at a speed of 16 knots (30 km/h; 18 mph).

The main armament of the Shimushu class consisted of three Type 3 120-millimeter (4.7 in) guns in single mounts, one superfiring pair aft and one mount forward of the superstructure. They were built with four Type 96 25-millimeter (1.0 in) anti-aircraft guns in two twin-gun mounts, but the total was increased to 15 guns by August 1943. A dozen depth charges were stowed aboard initially, but this was doubled in May 1942 when their minesweeping gear was removed. The anti-submarine weaponry later rose to 60 depth charges with a Type 97 81-millimeter (3.2 in) trench mortar and six depth charge throwers.

== Construction and career ==
Like her sister ship Ishigaki, Hachijō spent most of her early career in the Kuriles escorting ships. On 19 February 1943, Hachijō barely missed meeting her doom when she was detached from escorting Akagane Maru to Attu in the morning. That evening, Akagane Maru ran into the heavy cruiser USS Indianapolis with two destroyers and was sunk.

On 7 July 1944 Hachijō was severely damaged in an air attack, taking damage to her hull and an auxiliary engine room was flooded. Hachijō survived the war and was scrapped on 30 April 1948.
