= Fushimi-class gunboat =

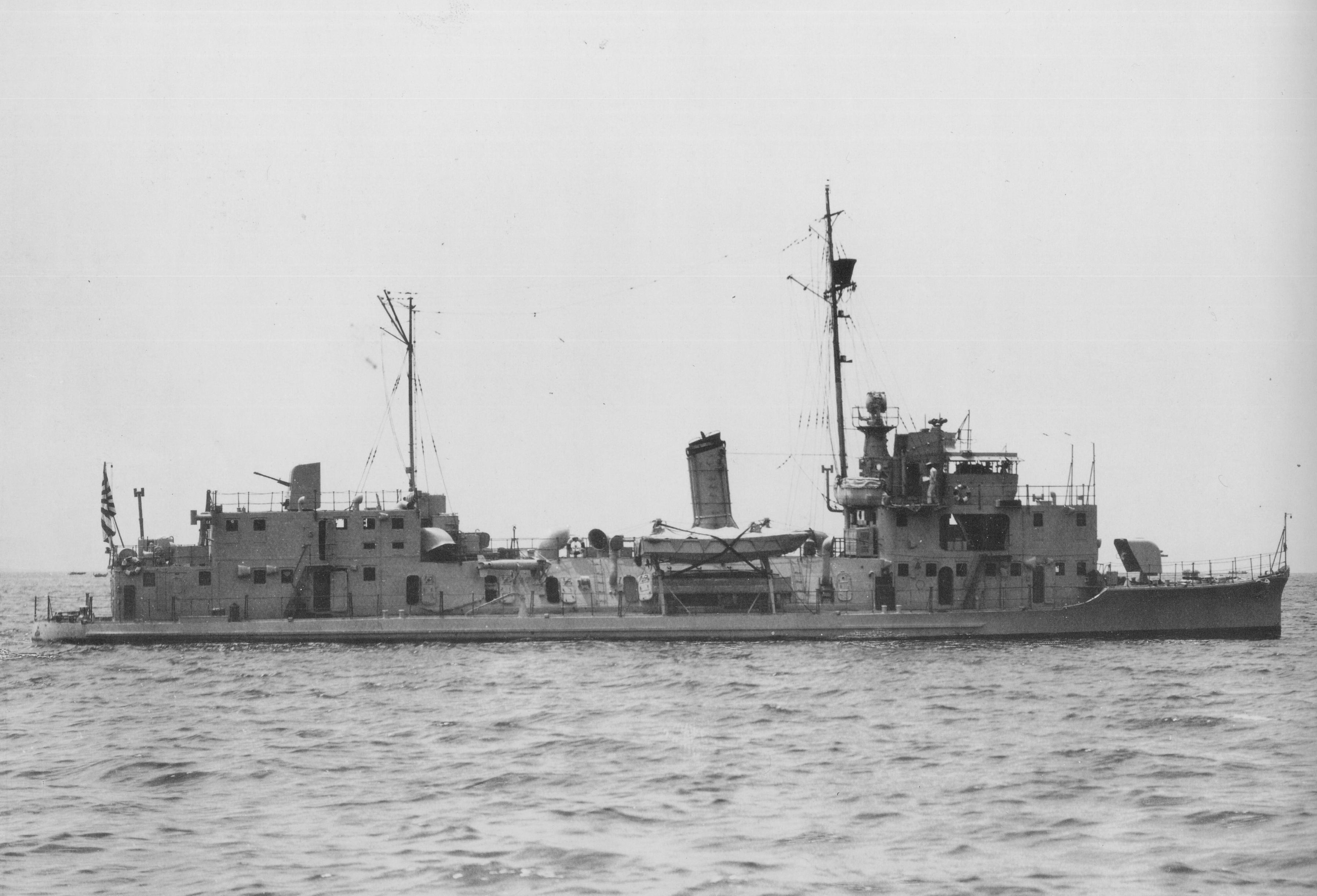
- Fushimi, the lead ship of her class, at Osaka, in July 1941.

Class overview
- Name: Fushimi class
- Operators: Imperial Japanese Navy
- Planned: 2
- Completed: 2

General characteristics
- Type: Gunboats
- Displacement: 304 t (299 long tons) standard weight; 368 t (362 long tons) full load
- Length: 48.5 m (159 ft 1 in)
- Draft: 1.26 m (4 ft 2 in)
- Speed: 17 knots (31 km/h; 20 mph)
- Armament: 1 × 8 cm (3.1 in) anti-aircraft gun; 2 × 25 mm (0.98 in) machine guns

The Fushimi-class gunboats (伏見型砲艦, Fushimi-gata hōkan) were a class of riverine gunboats of the Imperial Japanese Navy. The class consisted of two ships, Fushimi (伏見) and Sumida (隅田).

== Design and armament ==
The Fushimi class were 48.5 metres (159 ft 1 in) long, and had a draft of 1.26 metres (4 ft 2 in). Ships of the class had a standard displacement of 304 tonnes (299 long tons), 344 tonnes (339 long tons) at trial, and 368 tonnes (362 long tons) at full load. The class was propelled by a turbine-powered, oil-fired engine, which generated 1,600 kilowatts (2,200 shp), giving them a top speed of 17 knots (31 km/h; 20 mph). Both ships were armed with one 8-centimeter (3.1 in) anti-aircraft gun, and two 25-millimeter (0.98 in) machine guns.

== Operational history ==
Both ships, Fushimi and Sumida, were laid down in 1939, and were completed in 1939 and 1940, respectively.
