= Japanese escort ship Ishigaki =

Shimushu-class escort ship

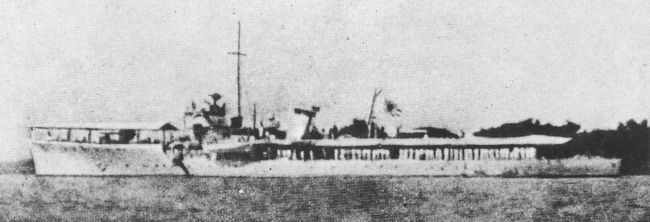

History

Empire of Japan
- Name: Ishigaki
- Namesake: Ishigaki Island
- Builder: Mitsui Engineering and Shipbuilding
- Laid down: 15 August 1939
- Launched: 14 September 1940
- Commissioned: 15 February 1941
- Stricken: 10 July 1944
- Fate: Torpedoed and sunk, 31 May 1944

General characteristics
- Class & type: Shimushu-class escort ship
- Displacement: 884 t (870 long tons) standard
- Length: 77.7 m (255 ft)
- Beam: 9.1 m (29 ft 10 in)
- Draught: 3.05 m (10 ft)
- Speed: 36.5 km/h (19.7 knots)
- Complement: 150
- Armament: 3 × 120 mm (4.7 in)/45 cal DP guns; Up to 15 × Type 96 25 mm (0.98 in) AA guns; 6 × depth charge throwers; Up to 60 × depth charges; 1 × 81 mm (3.2 in) mortar

Ishigaki (石垣) was one of four Shimushu-class escort ships built for the Imperial Japanese Navy during World War II.

== Background and description ==
The Japanese called these ships Kaibōkan, "ocean defence ships" (Kai = sea, ocean, Bo = defence, Kan = ship), to denote a multi-purpose vessel. They were initially intended for patrol and fishery protection, minesweeping and as convoy escorts. The ships measured 77.72 meters (255 ft 0 in) overall, with a beam of 9.1 meters (29 ft 10 in) and a draft of 3.05 meters (10 ft 0 in). They displaced 870 metric tons (860 long tons) at standard load and 1,040 metric tons (1,020 long tons) at deep load. The ships had two diesel engines, each driving one propeller shaft, which were rated at a total of 4,200 brake horsepower (3,100 kW) for a speed of 19.7 knots (36.5 km/h; 22.7 mph). The ships had a range of 8,000 nautical miles (15,000 km; 9,200 mi) at a speed of 16 knots (30 km/h; 18 mph).

The main armament of the Shimushu class consisted of three Type 3 120-millimeter (4.7 in) guns in single mounts, one superfiring pair aft and one mount forward of the superstructure. They were built with four Type 96 25-millimeter (1.0 in) anti-aircraft guns in two twin-gun mounts, but the total was increased to 15 guns by August 1943. A dozen depth charges were stowed aboard initially, but this was doubled in May 1942 when their minesweeping gear was removed. The anti-submarine weaponry later rose to 60 depth charges with a Type 97 81-millimeter (3.2 in) trench mortar and six depth charge throwers.

== Construction and career ==
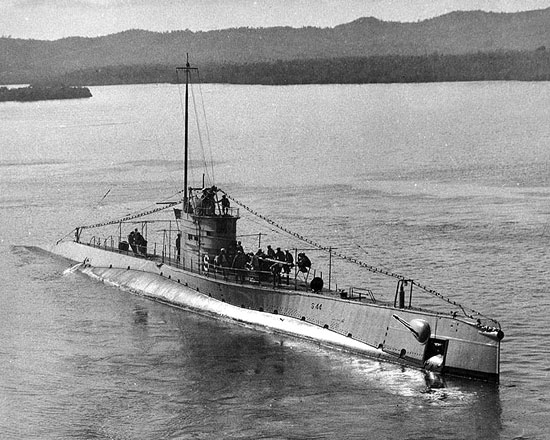
USS S-44, which was sunk by Ishigaki

Based in the Kuriles, she patrolled and escorted convoys and ships there. On 7 October 1943, Ishigaki sank the submarine USS S-44. S-44 discovered a target on her radar that she took to be a lone small freighter. S-44 opened fire with her 4-inch deck gun on the refrigerator ship Koko Maru. Ishigaki, Koko Maru's escort, sighted the submarine at 3,300 yards (3,000 m) and opened fire with her bow 4.7-inch gun. Captain Francis Brown of S-44 ordered a crash dive, but Ishigaki scored her first hit on S-44's conning tower before she could submerge. S-44 attempted to fight back with her deck gun, but her gunners were blinded by Ishigaki's 75-centimeter (30 in) searchlight and she scored no hits. Ishigaki then scored her second hit on the submarine's battery section. She then turned and all three 4.7-inch guns began firing at S-44. Soon, she scored several more hits on S-44 which began to sink. Perhaps as many as eight men had made it off the submarine; but only Chief Torpedoman's Mate Ernest A. Duva and Radioman Third Class William F. Whitemore were picked up by Ishigaki.

On 31 May 1944, Ishigaki was torpedoed by the submarine USS Herring, and her bow was destroyed. She managed to drop several depth charges before sinking with a loss of 167 sailors.

== General references ==
- Chesneau, Roger, ed. (1980). Conway's All the World's Fighting Ships 1922–1946. Greenwich, UK: Conway Maritime Press. ISBN 0-85177-146-7.
- Jentschura, Hansgeorg; Jung, Dieter & Mickel, Peter (1977). Warships of the Imperial Japanese Navy, 1869–1945. Annapolis, Maryland: United States Naval Institute. ISBN 0-87021-893-X.
