= Japanese escort ship Shimushu =

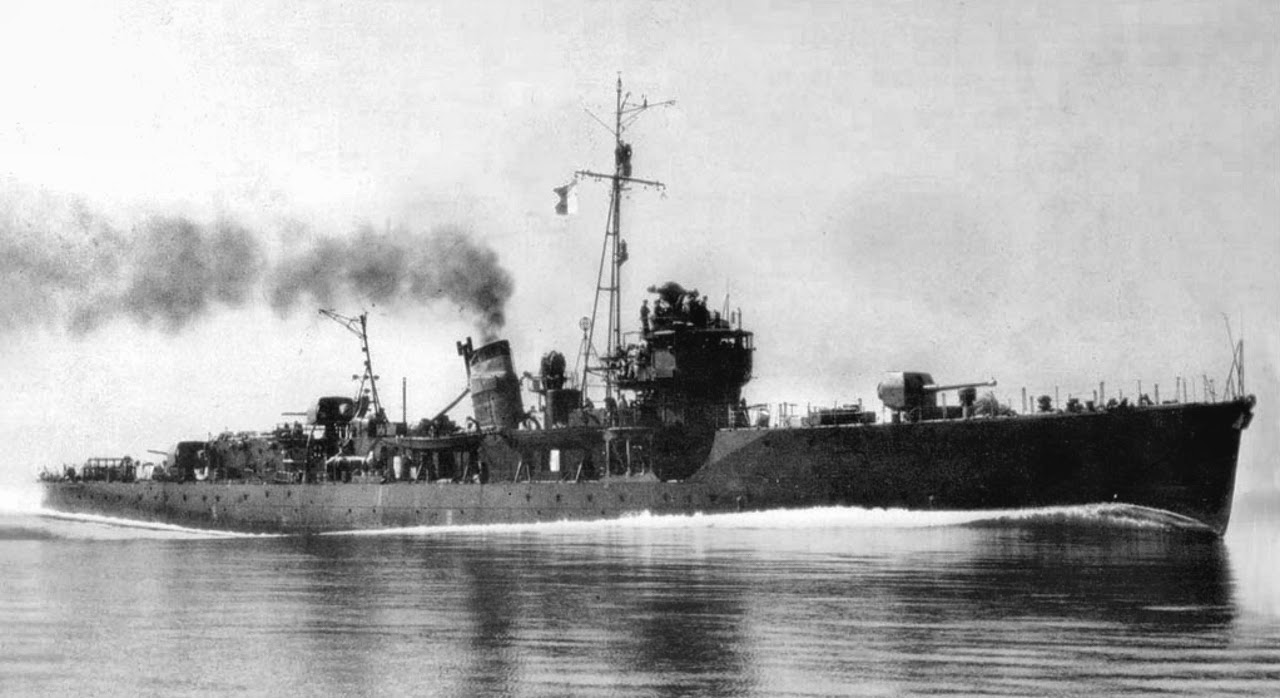
- Shimushu in 1940

History

Empire of Japan
- Name: Shimushu
- Namesake: Shimushu
- Builder: Mitsui Engineering and Shipbuilding
- Laid down: 29 November 1938
- Launched: 13 December 1939
- Commissioned: 30 June 1940
- Stricken: 5 October 1945
- Fate: Handed over to the Soviet Union, 5 July 1947

Soviet Union
- Name: EK-31
- Acquired: 5 July 1947
- Decommissioned: 16 May 1959
- Renamed: PS-25 (1948); PM-74 (1957)
- Fate: Scrapped

General characteristics
- Class & type: Shimushu-class escort ship
- Displacement: 870 long tons (880 t) (standard)
- Length: 77.7 m (254 ft 11 in)
- Beam: 9.1 m (29 ft 10 in)
- Draft: 3.05 m (10 ft 0 in)
- Speed: 19.7 kn (36.5 km/h; 22.7 mph)
- Complement: 150
- Armament: 3 × 120 mm (4.7 in)/45 cal dual purpose guns; Up to 15 × Type 96 25 mm (0.98 in) AA guns; 6 × depth charge throwers; Up to 60 × depth charges; 1 × 81 mm (3.2 in) mortar

Shimushu (占守) was the lead ship of her class of four escort ships built for the Imperial Japanese Navy during World War II.

== Background and description ==
The Japanese called these ships Kaibōkan, "ocean defence ships", (Kai = sea, ocean, Bo = defence, Kan = ship), to denote a multi-purpose vessel. They were initially intended for patrol and fishery protection, minesweeping and as convoy escorts. The ships measured 77.72 meters (255 ft 0 in) overall, with a beam of 9.1 meters (29 ft 10 in) and a draft of 3.05 meters (10 ft 0 in). They displaced 870 metric tons (860 long tons) at standard load and 1,040 metric tons (1,020 long tons) at deep load. The ships had two diesel engines, each driving one propeller shaft, which were rated at a total of 4,200 brake horsepower (3,100 kW) for a speed of 19.7 knots (36.5 km/h; 22.7 mph). The ships had a range of 8,000 nautical miles (15,000 km; 9,200 mi) at a speed of 16 knots (30 km/h; 18 mph).

The main armament of the Shimushu class consisted of three Type 3 120-millimeter (4.7 in) guns in single mounts, one superfiring pair aft and one mount forward of the superstructure. They were built with four Type 96 25-millimeter (1.0 in) anti-aircraft guns in two twin-gun mounts, but the total was increased to 15 guns by August 1943. A dozen depth charges were stowed aboard initially, but this was doubled in May 1942 when their minesweeping gear was removed. The anti-submarine weaponry later rose to 60 depth charges with a Type 97 81-millimeter (3.2 in) trench mortar and six depth charge throwers.

== Construction and career ==
Shimushu participated in the landings in Thailand, escorting the 55th IJA Infantry Division to landings at Nakhon on 8 December 1941. She also escorted various other invasion convoys to Malaya, Sumatra, and Palembang. Using her sonar, she located the British battlecruiser HMS Repulse on 29 January 1942, being the first ship to locate the submerged wreck.

Shimushu participated in the HI-40 convoy disaster of 19–24 February 1944, in which all six oilers that were escorted by her — and only her, as she was the lone escort vessel — Nampo Maru were torpedoed and sunk by the American submarines USS Grayback and Jack. After that convoy disaster, the Naval General staff discontinued assigning only one escort to convoys and organized larger convoys with more escorts.

Shimushu participated in the TA No. 2 and 3, the Japanese effort to hold Leyte island, and claimed one of the five B-25 Mitchell medium bombers lost in the first wave. On 25 November, Shimushu was torpedoed by the submarine USS Haddo and lost her bow, and was repaired by 20 January 1945. The ship spent more than a year on repatriation duty and was ceded to the Soviet Union on 5 July 1947. The ship served in the Soviet Pacific Ocean Fleet as patrol ship EK-31 (1947), dispatch ship PS-25 (1948), repair ship PM-74 (1957). She was decommissioned on 16 May 1959 and scrapped.
