= Ocean escort =

Ship type

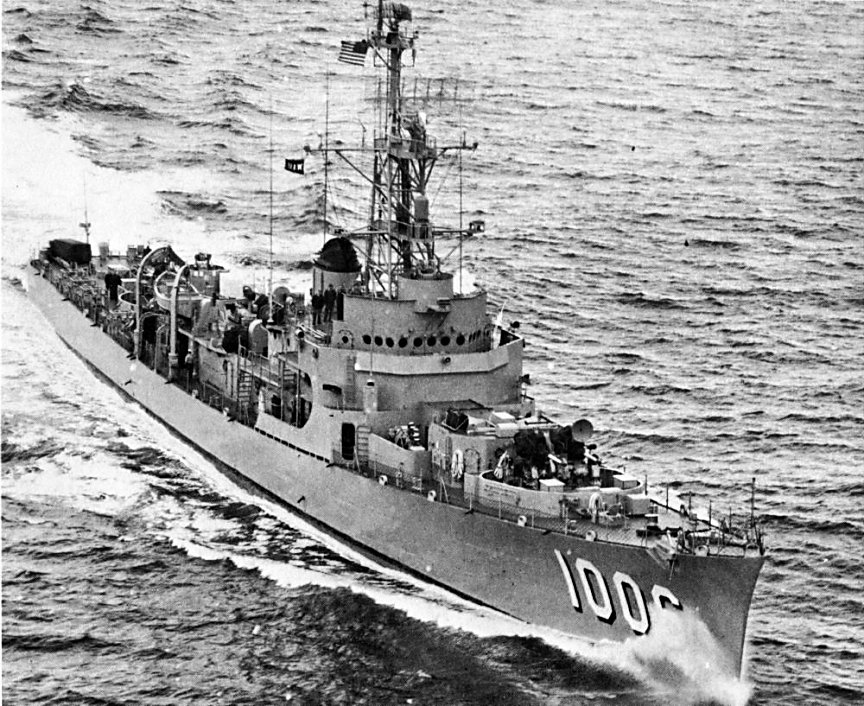
USS Dealey (DE-1006), the first ocean escort

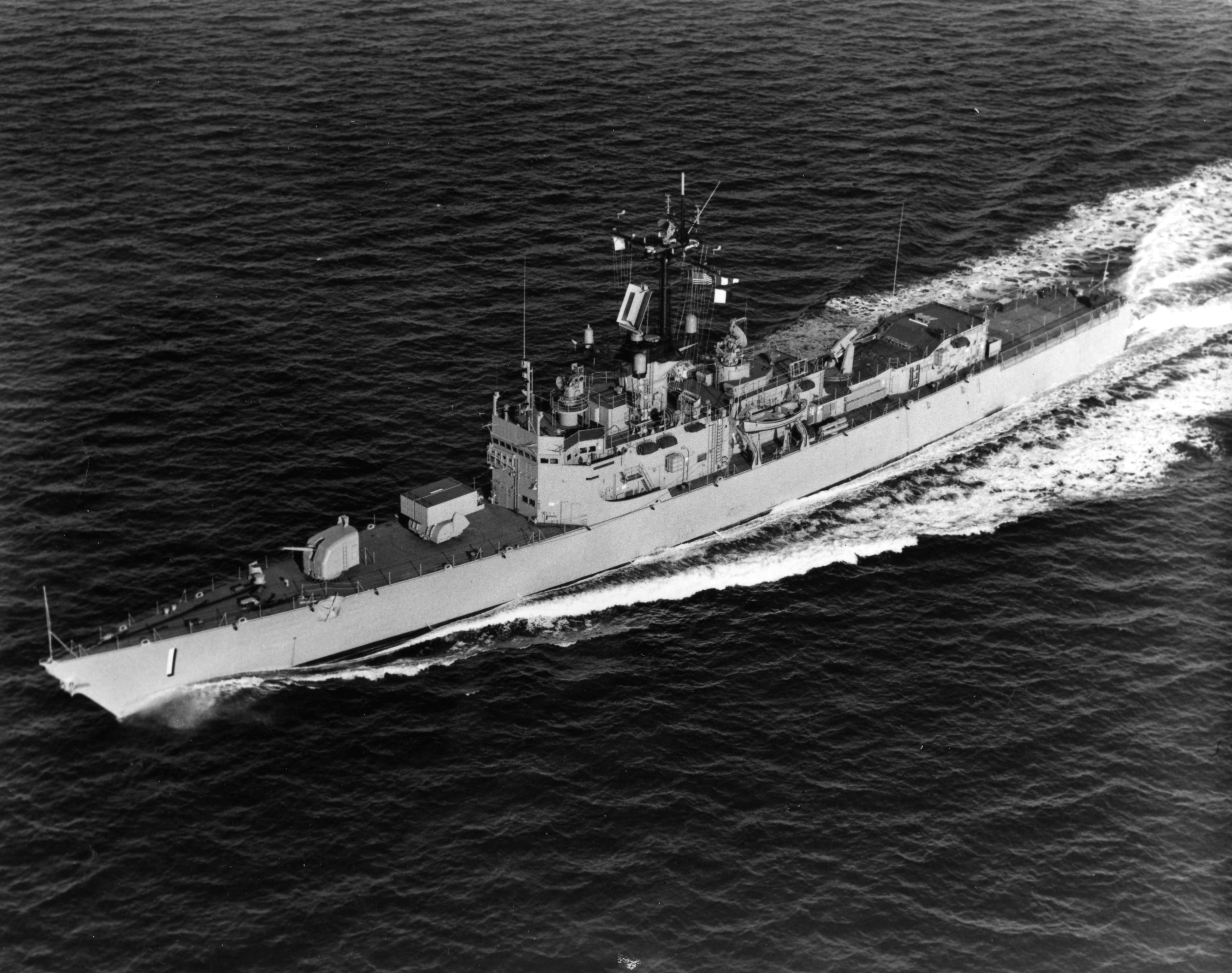
USS Brooke (DEG-1), lead ship of the only class of guided missile ocean escorts

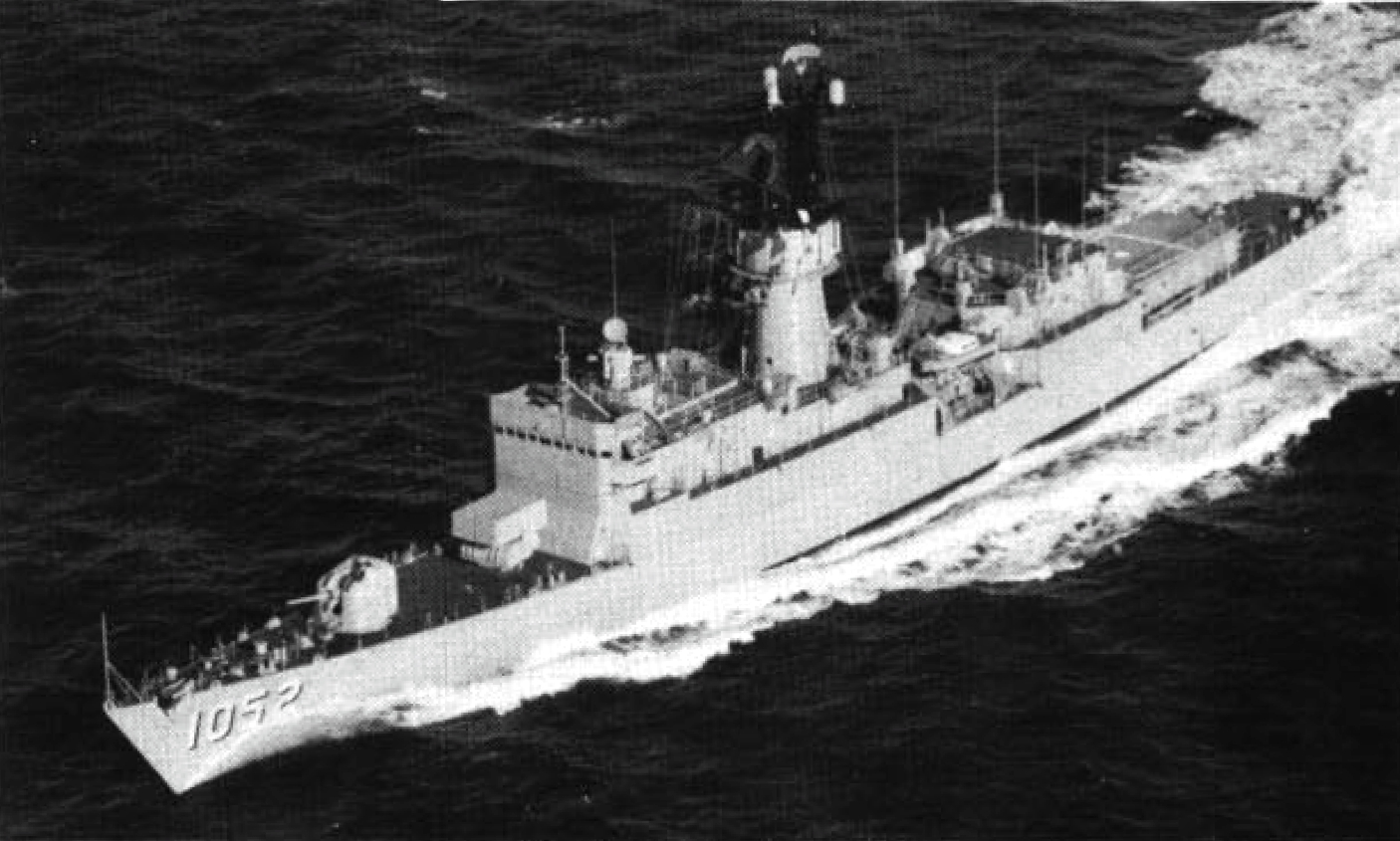
USS Knox (DE-1052), lead ship of the last class of ocean escorts

Ocean escort was a type of warship used by the United States Navy. They were an evolution of the destroyer escort types used during World War II. The ocean escorts were intended as convoy escorts and were designed for mobilization production in wartime or low-cost mass production in peacetime. They were commissioned from 1954 through 1974, serving in the Cold War and the Vietnam War.

== Designation ==
The ocean escorts' hull classification symbol was DE, a carryover from the World War II era when vessels of similar size and role were classified as destroyer escorts. DEs were ASW vessels; DEGs were ASW and AAW vessels with the short-range Tartar guided missile added. Ships similar or identical to the World War II destroyer escorts and the Cold War ocean escorts were called "frigates" in most other navies.

Outside the US Navy, no other navy appears to have used the ship type of "ocean escort". The closest equivalents in type name are the Soviet Riga and Petya classes, built circa 1954–65. These classes' Russian designation of storozhevoi korabi translates to "escort ship", "sentry ship", or "guard ship". These were smaller than any of the US ocean escorts, at 1,416 tons (Riga) and 1,150 tons (Petya) full load, compared with Dealey at 1,877 tons full load. Many USN ocean escorts were transferred to foreign navies following USN service; they received pennant numbers beginning with "D", "DE", "F", or (in the Mexican Navy) "E". The "E" designator was also used for ex-USN Fletcher-class destroyers in that navy.

== Ocean escort classes ==
- (13) Dealey-class
- (4) Claud Jones-class
- (2) Bronstein-class
- (11) Garcia-class
- (6) Brooke-class (DEG)
- (46) Knox-class
- (82) total

== 1975 reclassification ==
The ocean escort type corresponded to other nations' frigates (convoy escorts). Until 1975, the US Navy used the term "frigate" for destroyer leaders (DL, DLG, DLGN).

The 1975 ship reclassification changed the ocean escorts (DE/DEG) to frigates (FF/FFG) to be in line with other nations' classifications. The DLG-type "frigates" became either destroyers or cruisers, depending on tonnage.

== See also ==
- List of destroyer escorts of the United States Navy
- Frigate
- Destroyer escort
- Corvette - Cold War French Navy term for frigate-type ships
- Escort destroyer
