= Japanese landing ship No.140 =

History

Imperial Japanese Navy
- Name: T.140
- Builder: Sasebo Navy Yard
- Laid down: 26 July 1944
- Launched: 26 February 1944
- Sponsored by: Imperial Japanese Navy
- Completed: 13 April 1944
- Stricken: 10 March 1945
- Fate: Sunk by aircraft, 12 January 1945

General characteristics No.103 class
- Displacement: 870 long tons (884 t) standard; 1,020 long tons (1,036 t) trial
- Length: 80.50 m (264 ft 1 in) overall; 75.00 m (246 ft 1 in) waterline
- Beam: 9.10 m (29 ft 10 in)
- Draught: 2.94 m (9 ft 8 in)
- Draft: 5.65 m (18 ft 6 in)
- Propulsion: 1 × Kampon geared turbine; 2 × Kampon water tube boilers; single shaft, 2,500 shp
- Speed: 16.0 knots (18.4 mph; 29.6 km/h)
- Range: Going: 1,000 nmi (1,900 km) at 16 kn (30 km/h; 18 mph); Returning: 1,000 nmi (1,900 km; 1,200 mi) at 14 kn (26 km/h; 16 mph)
- Capacity: 120 troops, 22 tons freight and; Example 1: 13 × Type 95 Ha-Go; Example 2: 9 × Type 97 Chi-Ha; Example 3: 7 × Type 2 Ka-Mi; Example 4: 5 × Type 3 Ka-Chi; Example 5: 220 tons freight; Example 6: approx. 280 troops
- Complement: 100
- Armament: No.104, 20 August 1944; 1 × 76.2 mm (3.00 in) L/40 AA gun; 16 × Type 96 25 mm AA guns; 4 × 13 mm AA guns; 12 × depth charges

T.140 or No. 140 was a 103-class landing ship tank of the Imperial Japanese Navy during the Second World War.

== History ==
T.140 was laid down at the Sasebo Navy Yard on 26 July 1944, launched in August 1944, and completed in September 1944.

=== Reinforcement of Leyte ===
In January 1944, she was assigned to Convoy TA No. 9 which was tasked with the reinforcement of Leyte Island. The task force consisted of three transports (Mino Maru, Sorachi Maru, Tasmania Maru) carrying 4,000 troops of the 5th Infantry Regiment and two landing craft tank (T.140, T.159) carrying ten Type 2 Ke-To light tanks and 400 Special Naval Landing Force marines, escorted by Destroyer Division 30 (Yuzuki, Uzuki, Kiri) and Submarine Chaser Division 21 (CH-17, CH-37). On 9 December 1944, the task force left Manila for Ormoc Bay. On 11 December 1944, the convoy was attacked 30 miles off the coast of Leyte by 40 USMC F4U Corsair fighter-bombers of VMF-211, VMF-218, and VMF-313. The planes sank Tasmania Maru (1,192 dead) and Mino Maru (14 dead). Uzuki stayed behind to rescue survivors while Sorachi Maru, Ch-17, and Ch-37 were diverted to complete the landing at Palompon and T.140 and T.159, escorted by Yuzuki and Kiri, landed their troops and tanks as planned at Ormoc Bay. 8 of 10 tanks reached the shore but were quickly destroyed or captured on the beach by U.S. ground forces and the destroyer USS Coghlan. In the ensuing melee, both T. 159 and T.140 were heavily damaged. T.159 was deemed a total loss and abandoned while T.140 was able to limp away to safety. Sorachi Maru was able to safely disembark its troops at Palompon and then with CH-17 and Ch-37 as escorts, made it back to Manila on 3 December 1944. Uzuki was dispatched to join Kiri and Yuzuki with the damaged T.140 but was quickly spotted and torpedoed by the PT boats PT-490 and PT-492. While en route to Manila, Yūzuki was attacked and sunk by American aircraft. Kiri and T.140 made it to Manila on 3 December 1944.

=== Demise ===
On 12 January 1945, in the South China Sea off the coast of Vietnam at (10°20′N 107°50′E), she along with the Ikutagawa Maru (ex-Italian Ramb II) were attacked and sunk by aircraft from the Vice Admiral John S. McCain, Sr.'s Task Force 38 that had entered the South China Sea to raid Japanese shipping. T.140 was struck from the Navy List on 10 March 1945.
