= Japanese submarine chaser CH-17 =

History

Empire of Japan
- Name: CH-17
- Builder: Tokyo Ishikawajima Zosen, Fukagawa
- Laid down: 1941
- Launched: 3 May 1941
- Completed: 31 July 1941
- Commissioned: 31 July 1941
- Stricken: 10 September 1944
- Fate: Sunk by submarine USS Springer, 28 April 1945

General characteristics
- Class & type: No.13-class submarine chaser
- Displacement: 438 long tons (445 t) standard
- Length: 51 m (167 ft 4 in) o/a
- Beam: 6.7 m (22 ft 0 in)
- Draught: 2.75 m (9 ft 0 in)
- Propulsion: 2 × Kampon Mk.23A Model 8 diesels, 2 shafts, 1,700 bhp (1,268 kW)
- Speed: 16 knots (30 km/h; 18 mph)
- Range: 2,000 nmi (3,700 km) at 14 kn (26 km/h; 16 mph)
- Complement: 68
- Sensors & processing systems: 1 × Type 93 active sonar; 1 × Type 93 hydrophone
- Armament: 1 × 76.2 mm (3 in) L/40 AA gun; 2 × Type 93 13.2 mm (0.52 in) AA guns; 36 × Type 95 depth charges; 2 × Type 94 depth charge projectors; 1 × depth charge thrower

CH-17 was a No.13-class submarine chaser of the Imperial Japanese Navy during World War II.

== History ==
CH-17 was laid down by Tokyo Ishikawajima Zosen at their Fukagawa shipyard in 1941 and launched on 3 May 1941. On 31 July 1941, she was completed, commissioned, and registered to the Sasebo Naval District. On 1 October 1941, she was assigned to the 21st Subchaser Division (along with CH-4, CH-5, CH-6, CH-16, CH-18) and designated its flagship on 24 October 1941. On 8 December 1941, the division was assigned to the Second Base Force, Third Fleet.

=== Battle of Midway ===
In May 1942, she participated in the Battle of Midway (Operation "MI") where she was assigned to Miyamoto Sadachika's 16th Minesweeper Unit (along with auxiliary minesweepers Tama Maru No. 3, Tama Maru No. 5, Showa Maru No. 7, Showa Maru No. 8; submarine chasers CH-16, and CH-18; cargo ships Meiyo Maru and Yamafuku Maru; and auxiliary ammunition ship Soya).

=== Reinforcement of Leyte ===
In January 1944, she was assigned to Operation TA No. 9 which was tasked with the reinforcement of Leyte Island. Submarine Chaser Division 21 (consisting of CH-17 with CH-37) and Destroyer Division 30 (Yuzuki, Uzuki, Kiri) were to serve as escorts for three transports (Mino Maru, Sorachi Maru, Tasmania Maru) carrying 4,000 troops of the 5th Infantry Regiment and two landing craft tank (T.140, T.159) carrying ten Type 2 Ke-To light tanks and 400 Special Naval Landing Force marines. On 9 December 1944, the task force left Manila for Ormoc Bay. On 11 December 1944, the convoy was attacked 30 miles off the coast of Leyte by 40 USMC F4U Corsair fighter-bombers of VMF-211, VMF-218, and VMF-313. The planes sank Tasmania Maru (1,192 dead) and Mino Maru (14 dead). Uzuki stayed behind to rescue survivors while Sorachi Maru, Ch-17, and Ch-37 were diverted to land at Palompon; and T.140 and T.159 escorted by Yuzuki and Kiri landed their troops and tanks at Ormoc Bay. 8 of 10 tanks reached the shore but were quickly destroyed or captured on the beach by U.S. ground forces and the destroyer USS Coghlan. In the ensuing Battle of Ormoc Bay, both T.159 and T.140 were heavily damaged. T.159 was deemed a total loss and abandoned while T.140 was able to limp to safety. Sorachi Maru was able to safely disembark its troops at Palompon and then with CH-17 and Ch-37 as escorts, made it back to Manila on 3 December 1944. Uzuki was dispatched to join Kiri and Yuzuki with the damaged T.140 but was quickly spotted and torpedoed by the PT boats PT-490 and PT-492. While en route to Manila, Yūzuki was attacked and sunk by American aircraft. Kiri and T.140 made it to Manila on 3 December 1944.

=== Demise ===
On 28 April 1945, CH-17 while escorting No.101-class landing ship T.146 in Tomei Harbor, west of Kyushu off the Gotō Islands, she was spotted by the submarines USS Trepang and USS Springer who were operating with USS Raton. Springer spotted the ships first but was unable to close. Trepang was able to fire six torpedoes and scored a hit, sinking T.146. CH-17 counterattacked and dropped 14 depth charges on Trepang who then retreated to deeper water. Springer then fired three torpedoes and was able to cripple CH-17 before finishing her off with a final salvo. CH-17 sank at 32°25′N 128°46′E. CH-17 was struck from the Navy List on 25 May 1945.

== Additional references ==
- "Escort Vessels of the Imperial Japanese Navy special issue". Ships of the World (in Japanese). Vol. 45. Kaijinsha. February 1996.
- Model Art Extra No.340, Drawings of Imperial Japanese Naval Vessels Part-1 (in Japanese). Model Art Co. Ltd. October 1989.
- The Maru Special, Japanese Naval Vessels No.49, Japanese submarine chasers and patrol boats (in Japanese). Ushio Shobō. March 1981.
