= Showa Maru =

Showa Maru may refer to:

- Japanese auxiliary minesweeper Showa Maru No. 7, World War II-era Japanese auxiliary minesweeper
- Japanese auxiliary minesweeper Showa Maru No. 8, World War II-era Japanese auxiliary minesweeper
