= Grampus =

Grampus may refer to:

== Animals ==
- Grampus, the genus and another name for Risso's dolphin, Grampus griseus
- A synonym of the genus Orcinus
- Another name for Orcinus orca, the killer whale or orca
- Another name for the hellbender, a species of salamander
- Another name for Mastigoproctus giganteus, a species of whip scorpion

== Ships ==
- CSS Grampus, an American river steamer built in 1856 and used by the Confederate States Army during the American Civil War
- HMS Grampus, the name of a number of Royal Navy ships and submarines
- USFC Grampus, a fisheries research and fish-culture ship in commission with the United States Commission on Fish and Fisheries from 1886 to 1903 and as USFS Grampus with the United States Bureau of Fisheries from 1903 to 1917
- USS Grampus, the name of a number of ships of the United States Navy
- Grampus-class submarines, a group of minelaying submarines built for the British Royal Navy in the late 1930s
- Grampus, a fictional submarine in the anime series Blue Submarine No. 6
- Grampus, a fictional character in the British television series Tugs, based on the USS Grampus SS-4 - see List of Tugs characters

== Sports ==
- Nagoya Grampus, an association football club based in Nagoya, Japan

== See also ==
- Krampus, a mythical figure
