= Japanese submarine chaser CH-5 =

History

Empire of Japan
- Name: CH-5
- Builder: Mitsubishi Heavy Industries, Yokohama
- Laid down: 25 January 1938
- Launched: 28 July 1938
- Completed: 6 December 1938
- Commissioned: 6 December 1938
- Stricken: 10 August 1946
- Fate: Scuttled, 11 July 1946

General characteristics
- Type: Submarine chaser
- Displacement: 291 long tons (296 t) standard; 309 long tons (314 t) trial
- Length: 56.2 m (184 ft 5 in) overall; 55.5 m (182 ft 1 in) waterline
- Beam: 5.6 m (18 ft 4 in)
- Draught: 2.1 m (6 ft 11 in)
- Propulsion: 2 × Kampon Mk.22 Model 6 diesels, 2 shafts, 2,600 bhp
- Speed: 20.0 knots (23.0 mph; 37.0 km/h)
- Range: 2,000 nmi (3,700 km) at 14 kn (16 mph; 26 km/h)
- Complement: 59
- Armament: 2 × 40 mm heavy machine guns; 36 × depth charges; 2 × Type 94 depth charge projectors; 1 × depth charge thrower; 1 × Type 93 active sonar; 1 × Type 93 hydrophone; No.4, November 1944; 2 × 40 mm heavy machine guns; 3 × Type 96 25 mm AA guns; 36 × depth charges; 2 × Type 94 depth charge projectors; 2 × depth charge throwers (estimate); 1 × 13-Gō surface search radar; 1 × Type 3 active sonar; 1 × Type 93 hydrophone

CH-5 was a No.4-class submarine chaser of the Imperial Japanese Navy during World War II.

== History ==
CH-5 was laid down on 25 January 1938 at the Mitsubishi Heavy Industries shipyard in Yokohama, launched on 28 July 1938, and completed and commissioned on 6 December 1938.

She participated in the invasion of the Northern Philippines (Operation "M") in December 1941 where she was assigned to Sub Chaser Division 21 (SCD 21) led by Commodore Ota along with CH-4, CH-6, CH-16, CH-17, and CH-18. SCD 21 was at the time assigned to Rear Admiral Hirose Sueto's 2nd Base Force under Vice Admiral Ibō Takahashi's Third Fleet. She served mostly on escort duty during the war.

CH-5 was surrendered to the British Royal Navy after the war in severely damaged condition and scuttled on 11 July 1946 off Singapore. She was removed from the Navy list on 10 August 1946.

== Additional references ==
- "Escort Vessels of the Imperial Japanese Navy special issue". Ships of the World (in Japanese). Vol. 45. Kaijinsha. February 1996.
- Model Art Extra No.340, Drawings of Imperial Japanese Naval Vessels Part-1 (in Japanese). Model Art Co. Ltd. October 1989.
- The Maru Special, Japanese Naval Vessels No.49, Japanese submarine chasers and patrol boats (in Japanese). Ushio Shobō. March 1981.
