= Japanese minesweeper Tama Maru No. 5 =

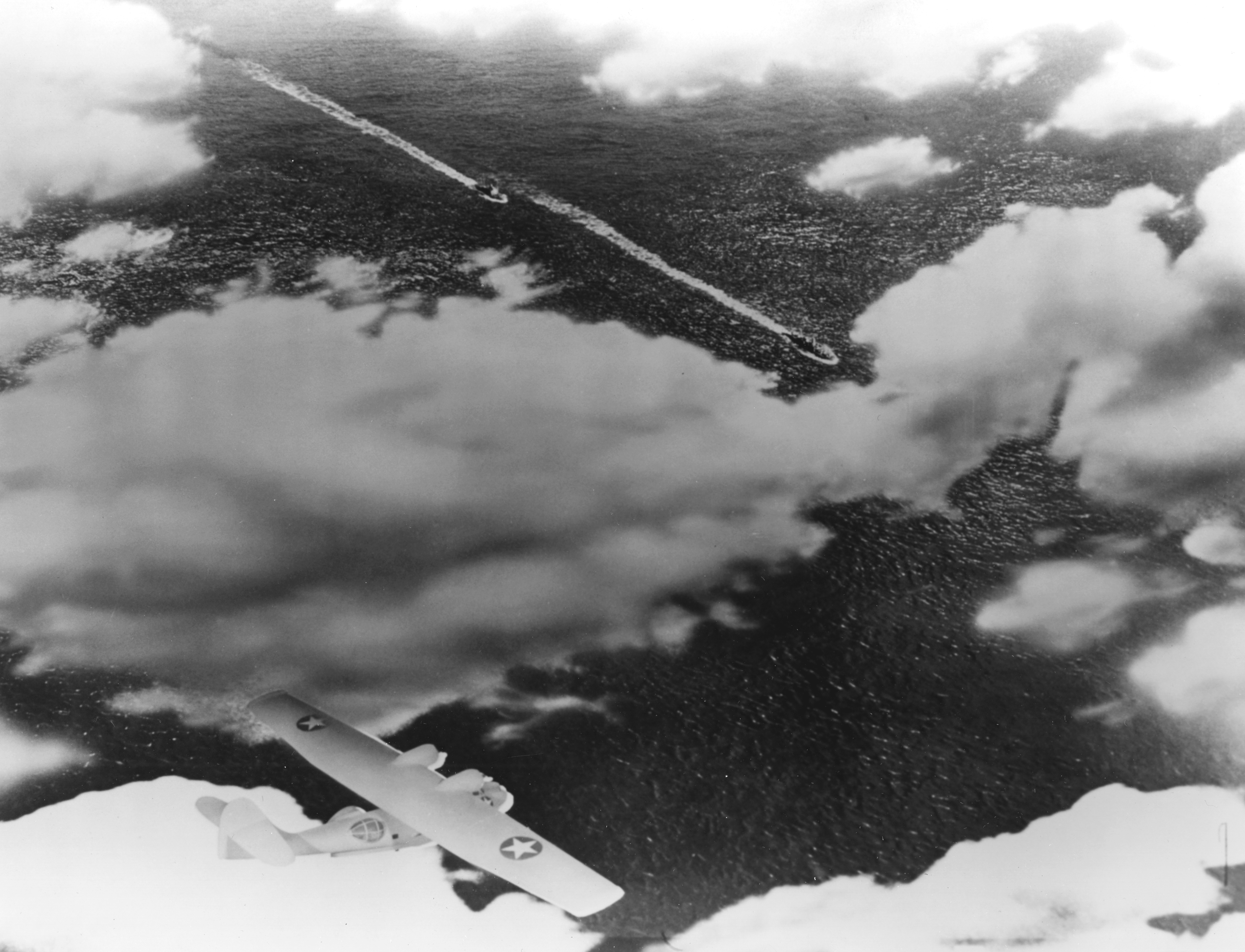
- Diorama depicting the sighting of the Japanese minesweepers Tama Maru No. 3 and Tama Maru No. 5 by a Midway-based Consolidated PBY Catalina at 0904 hrs on 3 June 1942. These ships had left Wake Island on 31 May, and were the first units of the Japanese invasion force to be spotted en route to Midway.

History

Empire of Japan
- Name: Tama Maru No. 5
- Builder: Mitsubishi Jukogyo K.K., Hikoshima
- Laid down: 25 April 1936
- Launched: 6 August 1936
- Sponsored by: Taiyo Hogei
- Completed: 27 September 1936
- Acquired: requisitioned by Imperial Japanese Navy, 12 September 1941
- Decommissioned: 31 March 1944
- Homeport: Osaka
- Identification: 42333
- Fate: Sunk 30 January 1944
- Notes: Call sign: JMKK

General characteristics
- Class & type: Tama Maru-class
- Tonnage: 257 GRT
- Length: 36.5 m (119 ft 9 in)
- Beam: 7.3 m (23 ft 11 in)
- Draught: 4.1 m (13 ft 5 in)

Tama Maru No. 5 (Japanese: 第五玉丸) was an auxiliary minesweeper of the Imperial Japanese Navy during World War II.

== History ==
Tama Maru No. 5 was laid down on 25 April 1936 at the Hikoshima shipyard of Mitsubishi Jukogyo K.K. at the behest of shipping company, Taiyo Hogei K.K. She was launched on 6 August 1936 and completed 27 September 1936. On 12 September 1941, she was requisitioned by the Imperial Japanese Navy and converted to an auxiliary minesweeper under Reserve Lieutenant Takato Akiro (高遠章). Takato served until 17 October 1943 when he was replaced by Reserve Lieutenant Fukigami Kiyomitsu (吹上清光). In May 1942, she participated in the Battle of Midway (Operation "MI") where she was assigned to Miyamoto Sadachika's 16th Minesweeper Unit (along with auxiliary minesweepers Tama Maru No. 3, Showa Maru No. 7, Showa Maru No. 8; submarine chasers CH-16, CH-17, and CH-18; cargo ships Meiyo Maru and Yamafuku Maru; and auxiliary ammunition ship Soya). Her fate is uncertain. She was removed from the Navy list on 31 March 1944.
