= Japanese submarine chaser CH-4 =

Imperial Japanese Navy submarine chaser

History

Empire of Japan
- Name: CH-4
- Builder: Sakurajima Zosensho, Osaka
- Laid down: 1 January 1938
- Launched: 13 September 1938
- Completed: 28 December 1938
- Commissioned: 28 December 1938
- Decommissioned: 3 May 1947
- Out of service: 13 August 1945

General characteristics
- Type: Submarine chaser
- Displacement: 291 long tons (296 t) standard; 309 long tons (314 t) trial
- Length: 56.2 m (184 ft 5 in) overall; 55.5 m (182 ft 1 in) waterline
- Beam: 5.6 m (18 ft 4 in)
- Draught: 2.1 m (6 ft 11 in)
- Propulsion: 2 × Kampon Mk.22 Model 6 diesels, 2 shafts, 2,600 bhp
- Speed: 20.0 knots (23.0 mph; 37.0 km/h)
- Range: 2,000 nmi (3,700 km) at 14 kn (16 mph; 26 km/h)
- Complement: 59
- Armament: 2 × 40 mm heavy machine guns; 36 × depth charges; 2 × Type 94 depth charge projectors; 1 × depth charge thrower; 1 × Type 93 active sonar; 1 × Type 93 hydrophone; No.4, November 1944; 2 × 40 mm heavy machine guns; 3 × Type 96 25 mm AA guns; 36 × depth charges; 2 × Type 94 depth charge projectors; 2 × depth charge throwers (estimate); 1 × 13-Gō surface search radar; 1 × Type 3 active sonar; 1 × Type 93 hydrophone

CH-4 was a No.4-class submarine chaser of the Imperial Japanese Navy during World War II.

== History ==
CH-4 was laid down on 1 January 1938 at the Sakurajima Zosensho shipyard in Osaka, launched on 13 September 1938, and completed and commissioned on 28 December 1938.

She participated in the invasion of the Northern Philippines (Operation "M") in December 1941 where she was assigned to Sub Chaser Division 21 (SCD 21) led by Commodore Ota along with CH-5, CH-6, CH-16, CH-17, and CH-18. SCD 21 was at the time assigned to Rear Admiral Hirose Sueto's 2nd Base Force under Vice Admiral Ibō Takahashi's Third Fleet. She served mostly on escort duty during the war. On 26 August 1943, while escorting transport Amagisan Maru and fleet oiler Tsurami, she was attacked off the coast of Palau by USS Tunny captained by Lieutenant Commander James A. Scott; Scott was forced to abandon his efforts after CH-4 damaged his submarine with depth charges.

On 13 August 1945, she hit a mine in the Surabaya Channel and never returned to duty due to the end of the war in August 1945. She was surrendered to the Allied forces at Bandjermasin, Borneo and later sold to a third party. She was removed from the Navy list on 3 May 1947.

== Additional references ==
- "Escort Vessels of the Imperial Japanese Navy special issue". Ships of the World (in Japanese). Vol. 45. Kaijinsha. February 1996.
- Model Art Extra No.340, Drawings of Imperial Japanese Naval Vessels Part-1 (in Japanese). Model Art Co. Ltd. October 1989.
- The Maru Special, Japanese Naval Vessels No.49, Japanese submarine chasers and patrol boats (in Japanese). Ushio Shobō. March 1981.
