= Japanese submarine chaser CH-6 =

History

Empire of Japan
- Name: CH-6

General characteristics
- Class & type: No.4-class submarine chaser
- Displacement: 291 long tons (296 t) standard; 309 long tons (314 t) trial
- Length: 56.2 m (184 ft 5 in) overall; 55.5 m (182 ft 1 in) waterline
- Beam: 5.6 m (18 ft 4 in)
- Draught: 2.1 m (6 ft 11 in)
- Propulsion: 2 × Kampon Mk.22 Model 6 diesels, 2 shafts, 2,600 bhp (1,900 kW)
- Speed: 20.0 knots (23.0 mph; 37.0 km/h)
- Range: 2,000 nmi (3,700 km) at 14 kn (16 mph; 26 km/h)
- Complement: 59
- Armament: 2 × 40 mm heavy machine guns; 36 × depth charges; 2 × Type 94 depth charge projectors; 1 × depth charge thrower; 1 × Type 93 active sonar; 1 × Type 93 hydrophone; No.4, November 1944; 2 × 40 mm heavy machine guns; 3 × Type 96 25 mm AA guns; 36 × depth charges; 2 × Type 94 depth charge projectors; 2 × depth charge throwers (estimate); 1 × 13-Gō surface search radar; 1 × Type 3 active sonar; 1 × Type 93 hydrophone

CH-6 was a No.4-class submarine chaser of the Imperial Japanese Navy during World War II.

== History ==
She participated in the invasion of the Northern Philippines (Operation "M") in December 1941 where she was assigned to Sub Chaser Division 21 (SCD 21) led by Commodore Ota along with CH-4, CH-5, CH-16, CH-17, and CH-18. SCD 21 was at the time assigned to Rear Admiral Hirose Sueto's 2nd Base Force under Vice Admiral Ibō Takahashi's Third Fleet.

== Additional references ==
- "Escort Vessels of the Imperial Japanese Navy special issue". Ships of the World (in Japanese). Vol. 45. Kaijinsha. February 1996.
- Model Art Extra No.340, Drawings of Imperial Japanese Naval Vessels Part-1 (in Japanese). Model Art Co. Ltd. October 1989.
- The Maru Special, Japanese Naval Vessels No.49, Japanese submarine chasers and patrol boats (in Japanese). Ushio Shobō. March 1981.
