= No.13-class submarine chaser =

Japanese class of submarine chasers

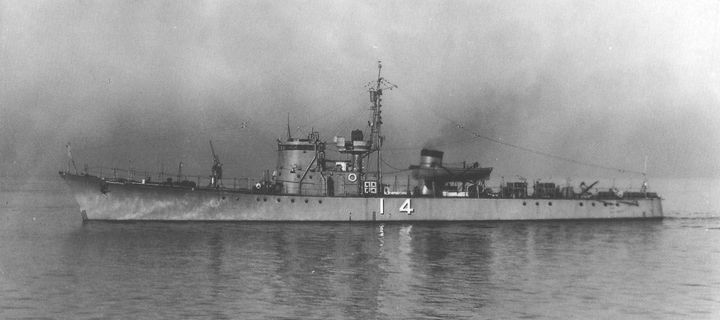
- No.13 class No.14 in March 1941

Class overview
- Name: No.13 class submarine chasers; No.13 class; No.28 class; No.60 class
- Builders: Niigata Iron Works (7); Nihon Kōkan (6); Hakodate Dock Corporation (5); Harima Zōsen Corporation (5); Tōkyō Ishikawajima Shipyard (4); Hitachi Zōsen (4); Kawanami Kōgyō Corporation (4); Tama Shipyards (3); Naniwa Dock Company (3); Mitsubishi Heavy Industries (2); Ōsaka Iron Works (3); Tama Shipyards (2); Tsurumi Iron Works (1); Fujinagata Shipyards (0)
- Operators: Imperial Japanese Navy; Republic of China Navy; Soviet Navy
- Preceded by: No.4 class submarine chaser
- Succeeded by: No.1 class coast defence boat No.101 class coast defence boat (jp:海防艇)
- Built: 1939–1944
- In commission: 1940–1956
- Planned: 77
- Completed: 49
- Canceled: 28
- Lost: 35
- Retired: 14

General characteristics
- Type: Submarine chaser
- Displacement: No.13 class; 438 long tons (445 t) standard; No.28 class and No.60 class; 420 long tons (427 t) standard
- Length: 51.00 m (167 ft 4 in) overall
- Beam: 6.70 m (22 ft 0 in)
- Draught: No.13 class; 2.75 m (9 ft 0 in); No.28 class and No.60 class; 2.63 m (8 ft 8 in)
- Propulsion: No.13, No.14, No.15 and No.16; 2 × Kampon Mk.23A Model 8 diesels, 2 shafts, 1,700 bhp; all others; 2 × Kampon Mk.23B Model 8 diesels, 2 shafts, 1,700 bhp
- Speed: 16.0 knots (18.4 mph; 29.6 km/h)
- Range: 2,000 nmi (3,700 km) at 14 kn (16 mph; 26 km/h)
- Complement: No.13 class; 68; No.28 class and No.60 class; 80
- Armament: No.13 on 1940; 1 × 76.2 mm (3.00 in) L/40 AA gun; 2 × Type 93 13.2 mm (0.52 in) AA guns; 36 × Type 95 depth charges; 2 × Type 94 depth charge projectors; 1 × depth charge thrower; 1 × Type 93 active sonar; 1 × Type 93 hydrophone; No.30 in August 1944; 1 × 76.2 mm L/40 AA gun; 3 × Type 96 25 mm AA guns; 2 × Type 93 13 mm AA guns; 36 × Type 2 depth charges; 2 × Type 94 depth charge projectors; 2 × depth charge throwers; 1 × 22-Gō surface search radar; 1 × Type 3 active sonar; 1 × Type 93 hydrophone

The No.13 class submarine chaser (第十三号型駆潜艇,, Dai 13 Gō-gata Kusentei) was a class of submarine chasers of the Imperial Japanese Navy (IJN), serving during and after World War II; three submarine classes were built, but the IJN's official document calls all of them the No.13 class.

== Background ==
- In 1938, the Soviet Union strengthened its Pacific Ocean Fleet, increasing the number of submarines it possessed; the No.13 class was designed to counter this potential threat to Japanese shipping.

== Ships in classes ==
=== No.13 class ===
- Project number K8. 15 vessels were built in 1939-42 under the Maru 4 Programme (Ship # 180 – 183) and the Maru Rin Programme (Ship # 184 – 194). And after the Maru Rin Programme vessels were equipped with a kitchen and food storage between bridge and the chimney for a long cruise.

Ship #	Ship	Builder	Completed	Fate
180	No.13 (第13号駆潜艇, Dai-13-Gō Kusentei) the same shall apply hereinafter	Tsurumi Iron Works	15 July 1940	Sunk by USS Pickerel at southeast of Noda, 3 April 1943.
181	No.14	Tama Shipyards	31 March 1941	Sunk by aircraft at Owase, 28 July 1945.
182	No.15	Ōsaka Iron Works	31 March 1941	Decommissioned on 30 November 1945. Scrapped 1948.
183	No.16	Nihon Kōkan	5 April 1941	Sunk by aircraft at Chichi-jima, 4 July 1944.
184	No.17	Tōkyō Ishikawajima Shipyard	31 July 1941	Sunk by USS Springer at Gotō Islands, 28 April 1945.
185	No.18	Nihon Kōkan	31 July 1941	Sunk by aircraft at west of Manila, 30 December 1944.
186	No.19	Harima Zōsen	20 September 1941	Sunk at Sasebo after the war.
187	No.20	Tama Shipyards	20 August 1941	Scrapped 1948.
188	No.21	Ōsaka Iron Works	20 August 1941	Decommissioned on 5 October 1945. Surrendered to United Kingdom on 7 October 1947, later scrapped.
189	No.22	Mitsubishi Heavy Industries	12 October 1941	Sunk by aircraft at Steven Channel on 19 February 1944.
190	No.23	Harima Zōsen	15 November 1941	Decommissioned on 25 October 1945. Scrapped 1948.
191	No.24	Ōsaka Iron Works	20 December 1941	Sunk by USS Burns at west of Truk, 17 February 1944.
192	No.25	Mitsubishi Heavy Industries	29 December 1941	Sunk by USS Grunion at Kiska, 15 July 1942.
193	No.26	Nihon Kōkan	20 December 1941	Sunk by aircraft off Jinhae, 30 July 1945.
194	No.27	Tōkyō Ishikawajima Shipyard	18 January 1942	Sunk by USS Grunion at Kiska, 15 July 1942.

=== No.28 class ===
- Project number K8B. 31 vessels were built in 1941-44 under the Maru Rin Programme (Ship # 221 – 232) and the Maru Kyū Programme (Ship # 440 – 458). They abolished a slant of stern for mass production.

Ship #	Ship	Builder	Completed	Fate
221	No.28	Nihon Kōkan	15 May 1942	Sunk by aircraft at Balintang Channel, 1 February 1945.
222	No.29	Harima Zōsen	30 April 1942	Sunk by aircraft off Truk, 18 February 1944.
223	No.30	Mitsui Engineering & Shipbuilding	13 May 1942	Sunk by USS Barbero off Kuching, 24 December 1944.
224	No.31	Tōkyō Ishikawajima Shipyard	15 June 1942	Sunk by aircraft at southeast of French Indochina, 12 January 1945.
225	No.32	Nihon Kōkan	19 August 1942	Sunk by aircraft at Coron Bay, 24 September 1944.
226	No.33	Mitsui Engineering & Shipbuilding	15 August 1942	Sunk by aircraft at Cam Ranh Bay, 21 March 1945.
227	No.34	Harima Zōsen	31 August 1942	Sunk by HMS Saumarez, HMS Vigilant and HMS Rapid at east of Little Andaman, 26 March 1945.
228	No.35	Hakodate Dock	28 February 1943	Sunk by aircraft at Mekong, 23 February 1945.
229	No.36	Tōkyō Ishikawajima Shipyard	15 October 1942	Sunk by aircraft at Subic Bay, 19 November 1944.
230	No.37	Mitsui Engineering & Shipbuilding	31 October 1942	Sunk by aircraft at Amami Ōshima, 22 May 1945.
231	No.38	Nihon Kōkan	10 December 1942	Decommissioned on 25 October 1945. Surrendered to Soviet Union on 3 October 1947.
232	No.39	Harima Zōsen	31 October 1942	Sunk by aircraft at Kavieng, 16 February 1944.
440	No.40	Hitachi Zōsen	31 March 1942	Sunk by aircraft off Kavieng, 19 February 1944.
441	No.41	Kawanami Kōgyō	31 January 1943	Scuttled by Royal Navy, 11 July 1946. Decommissioned on 10 August 1946.
442	No.42	Hitachi Zōsen	31 January 1943	Sunk by aircraft at Onagawa, 9 August 1945.
443	No.43	Niigata Iron Works	7 April 1943	Sunk by aircraft at Cam Ranh Bay, 12 January 1945.
444	No.44	Kawanami Kōgyō	15 May 1943	Decommissioned on 15 September 1945. Scrapped 1948.
445	No.45	Hakodate Dock	15 October 1943	Sunk by aircraft at Cebu, 29 November 1944.
446	No.46	Hitachi Zōsen	30 September 1943	Sunk by aircraft at Masbate, 25 November 1944.
447	No.47	Kawanami Kōgyō	12 August 1943	Decommissioned on 15 September 1945. Surrendered to United States on 1 October 1947 at Qingdao. Sunk as target at 35°45′N 123°17′E, 7 October 1947.
448	No.48	Niigata Iron Works	31 July 1943	Sunk by naval bombardment at Kamaishi, 14 July 1945.
449	No.49	Hakodate Dock	31 January 1944	Decommissioned on 5 October 1945. Surrendered to Republic of China on 3 October 1947, and renamed Haihong. Renamed Yalong (PC-106) in January 1951. Renamed Qujiang in 1954. Decommissioned on 1 October 1956.
450	No.50	Hitachi Zōsen	30 November 1943	Sunk by aircraft at Chichi-jima, 20 July 1944.
451	No.51	Kawanami Kōgyō	8 November 1943	Decommissioned on 15 September 1945. Scrapped on 1 August 1948.
452	No.52	Naniwa Dock	30 November 1943	Scrapped 1948.
453	No.53	Naniwa Dock	20 March 1944	Sunk by USS Waller and USS Pringle at Ormoc Bay, 28 November 1944.
454	No.54	Niigata Iron Works	12 November 1943	Sunk by USS Pollack at Bonin Islands, 25 March 1944.
455	No.55	Hakodate Dock	31 May 1944	Sunk by aircraft at Cebu Strait, 13 September 1944.
456	No.56	Naniwa Dock	26 July 1944	Decommissioned 1947.
457	No.57	Hakodate Dock	28 October 1944	Sunk by HMS Tartar and HMS Eskimo at north of Sabang, 12 June 1945.
458	No.58	Niigata Iron Works	26 January 1944	Sunk by aircraft at Amami Ōshima, 22 May 1945.
459	No.59			Cancelled in 1943.

=== No.60 class ===
- Project number K8C. 3 vessels were built in 1943-44 under the Kai-Maru 5 Programme (Ship # 5341, # 5342 and 5344). They were changed inner hull design from the No.28 class. Therefore, there is not a difference of appearances.

Ship #	Ship	Builder	Completed	Fate
5341	No.60	Niigata Iron Works	28 March 1944	Decommissioned on 5 October 1945. Scrapped 1948.
5342	No.61	Niigata Iron Works	8 May 1944	Sunk by aircraft at south of Taiwan, 9 January 1945.
5343	No.62			Cancelled in 1943.
5344	No.63	Niigata Iron Works	30 June 1944	Sunk by HMS Virago and HMS Volage at east of Little Andaman, 26 March 1945.
5345 – 5370	No.64 to No.89			Cancelled in 1943.

== Photo ==
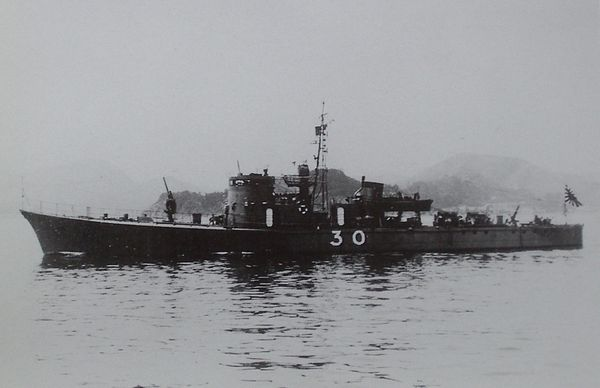
No.30 on 13 May 1942

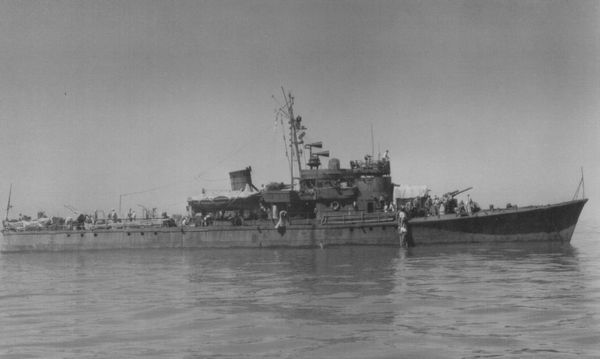
No.23 or No.38 on 16 September 1945

== Bibliography ==
- Monthly Ships of the World, Special issue Vol. 45, "Escort Vessels of the Imperial Japanese Navy", "Kaijinsha"., (Japan), February 1996
- Model Art Extra, No. 340 "Drawings of Imperial Japanese Naval Vessels Part-1", "Model Art Co. Ltd". (Japan), October 1989
- The Maru Special, Japanese Naval Vessels No. 49, "Japanese submarine chasers and patrol boats", "Ushio Shobō". (Japan), March 1981
- 50-year History of Harima Zōsen, Harima Zōsen Corporation, November 1960
