= HMS Grampus =

Eleven vessels of the Royal Navy have been named HMS Grampus after two members of the dolphin family (Delphinidae): Grampus griseus, also known as Risso's dolphin, and Orcinus orca, also known as the killer whale.

- HMS Grampus (1731) was a 14-gun sloop launched in 1731. She foundered in the English Channel in 1742.
- HMS Grampus (1743) was a 14-gun sloop launched in 1743 and was captured by the French in 1744.
- HMS Grampus (1746) was a 14-gun sloop launched in 1746. She was converted to a fire ship and renamed Strombolo in 1775. She was hulked in 1780.
- HMS Grampus was a 70-gun third-rate ship of the line launched in 1751 as HMS Buckingham. She was renamed HMS Grampus in 1777 and used as a storeship.
- HMS Grampus (1782) was a 50-gun fourth rate launched in 1782 and broken up in 1794.
- HMS Grampus was a 54-gun fourth rate, originally the East Indiaman Ceres, which the Admiralty purchased in 1795; she grounded and was abandoned in 1799.
- HMS Grampus (1802) was a 50-gun fourth rate launched in 1802. She was used for harbour service from 1820, became the first of the Seamen's Hospital Society's hospital ships, and was sold in 1832.
- HMS Grampus (1845) was a 50-gun fourth rate, originally launched in 1784 as the 74-gun third-rate HMS Tremendous. She was reduced to 50 guns in 1845, and renamed HMS Grampus. She served as powder hulk from 1856 and was sold in 1897.
- HMS Grampus (1910) was a Beagle-class destroyer launched in 1910 as HMS Nautilus. She was renamed HMS Grampus in 1913 and was sold in 1920.
- HMS Grampus (N56) was a Grampus-class submarine launched in 1936 and sunk by Italian torpedo boats in 1940.
- HMS Grampus (S04) was a Porpoise-class submarine launched in 1957. She was used as a training ship from 1976 until 1979, and was sunk as a target in 1980.

== See also ==
- CSS Grampus
- USS Grampus
