= Museum of Maritime Science =

Coordinates: 35°37′10″N 139°46′22″E

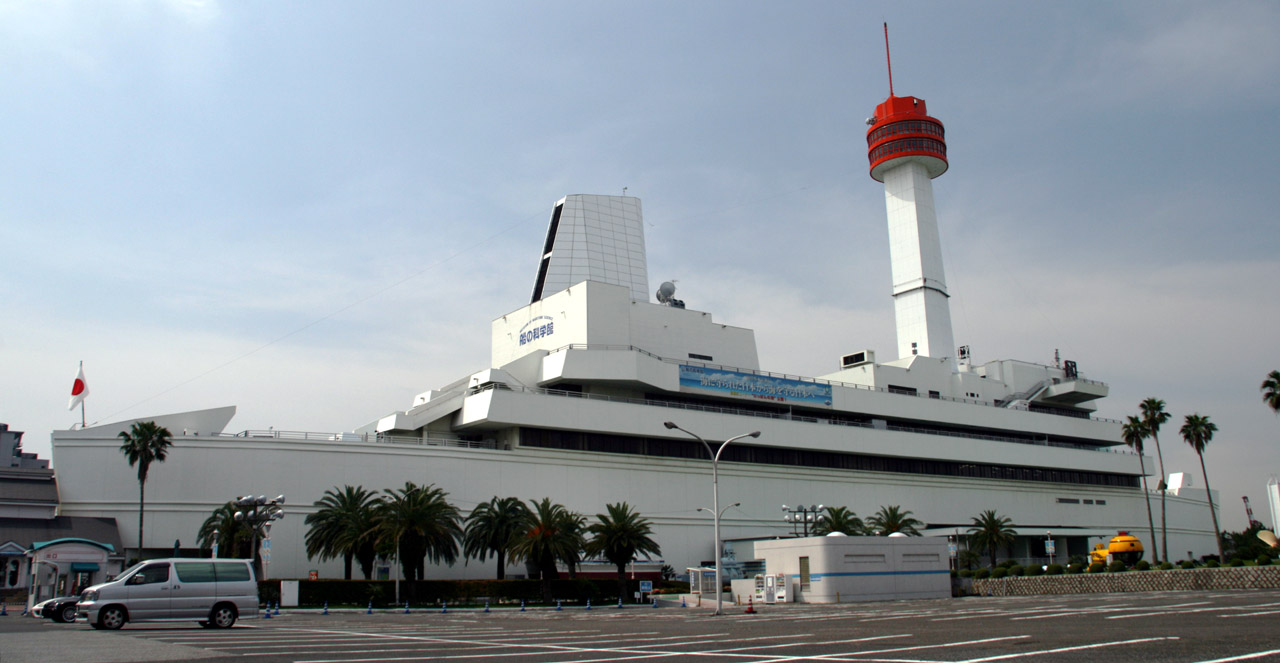
- Museum from North West Side
- Established: July 20, 1974
- Dissolved: January 28, 2025
- Location: Higashi Yashio, Shinagawa, Tokyo, Japan
- Type: Maritime museum
- Public transit access: Yurikamome (Tokyo International Cruise Terminal)
- Website: www.funenokagakukan.or.jp

The Museum of Maritime Science (船の科学館, Fune-no-kagakukan) was a marine science museum located in Higashiyashio, Shinagawa, Tokyo on Odaiba island, Japan.

In 2011 the museum announced to cease the most parts of its operation for renovation, while keeping some functions active, including exhibit of Sōya, scientific research and educational programs. Instead of renovation plan update, they decided to dismantle the museum's buildings, which is planned from April 2024 to October 2025 reportedly.

Until its closure, exhibits included Japanese boats, items related to the navy, shipping industry, fishing, sailing, maritime recreation, ship design and building, and the environment of the seas and oceans around Japan.

The museum building itself is modelled after the British ocean liner Queen Elizabeth 2. The building served for main exhibit until its closure in September, 2011.

Outside the museum building are a number of exhibits including a large screw propeller, Ayumi I-Go Ocean Floor House, Tankai Submarine and PC-18 submersible, a wooden fishing boat from Kujūkuri, Osesaki lighthouse and Anorisaki Lighthouse.

Since May 1979 the icebreaker Sōya has been moored alongside the museum open to the public. It is now the only remaining element attached to the museum.

== Gallery ==
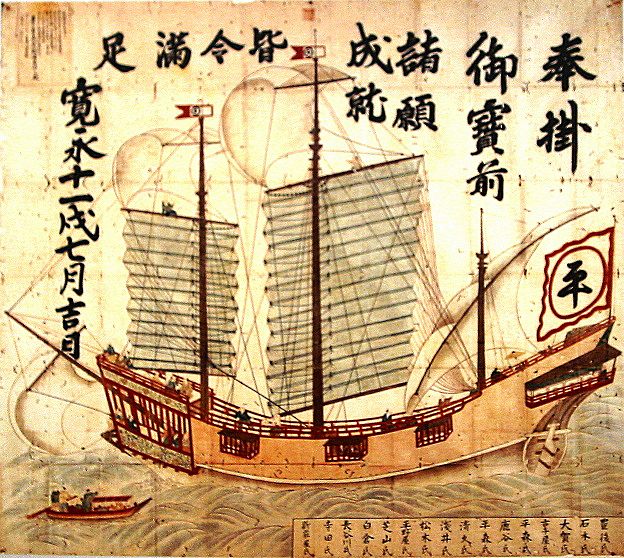
Painting of a Red Seal Ship

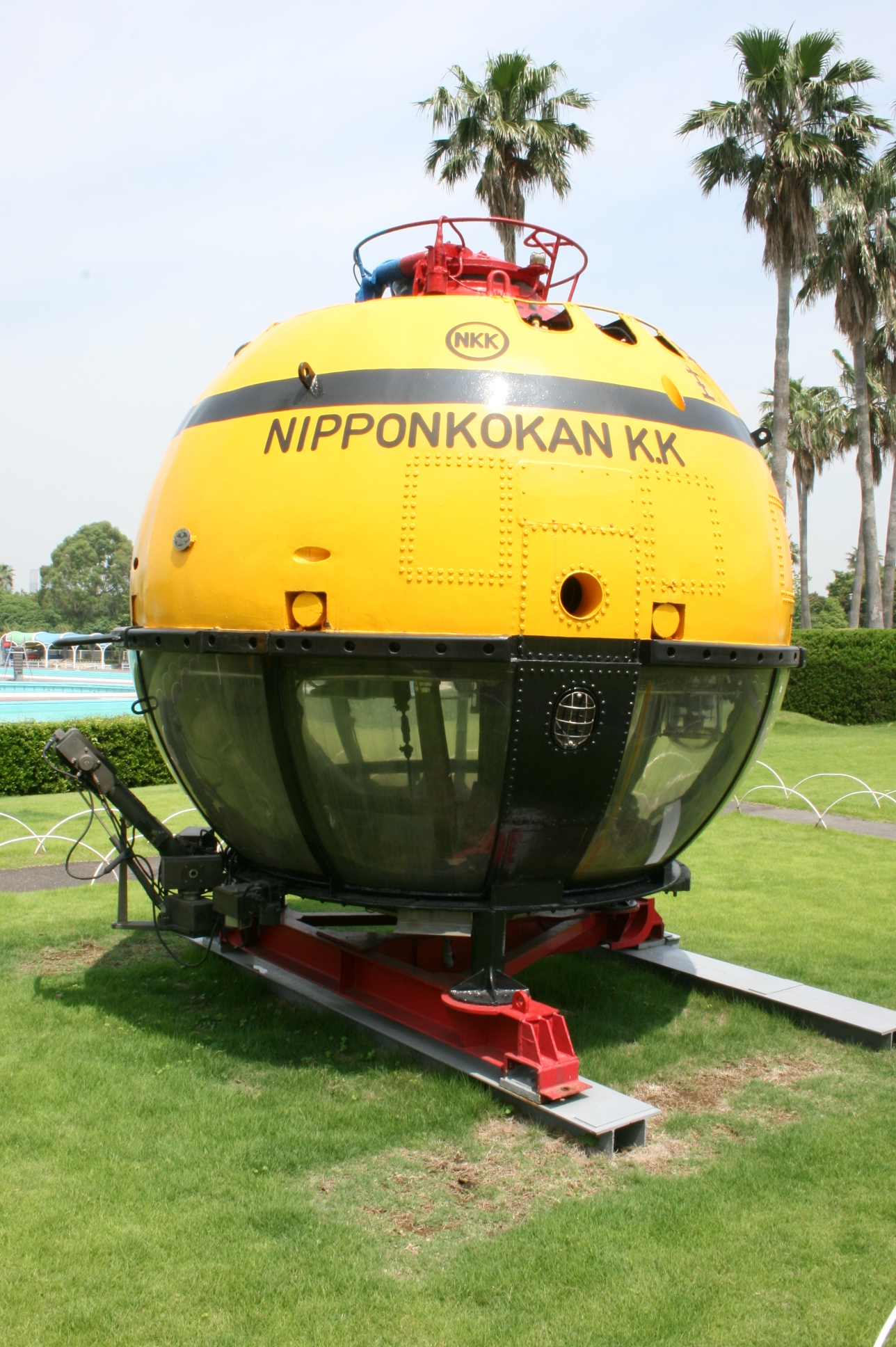
Submarine Tankai.

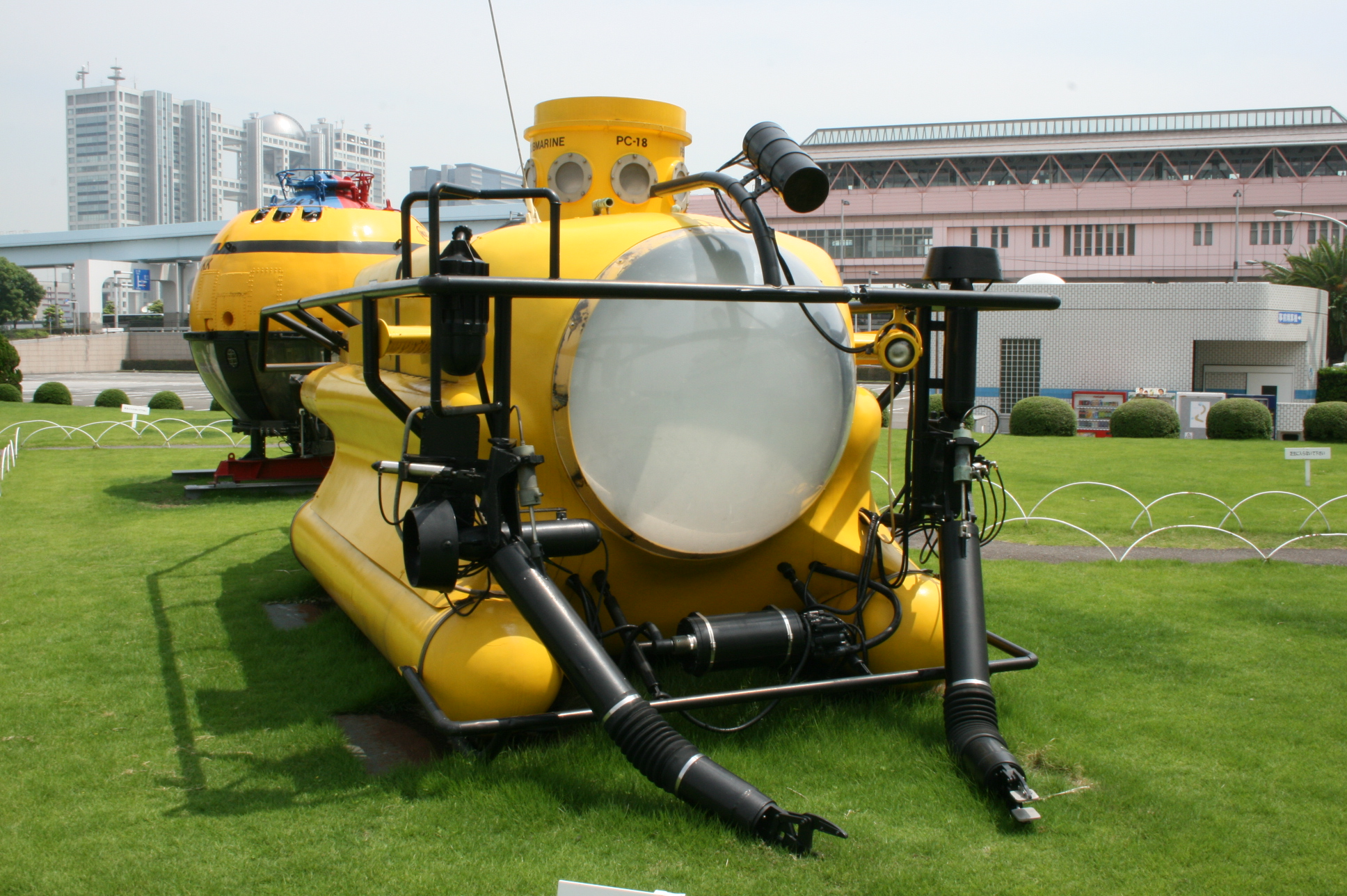
Deep sea submarine PC-18.

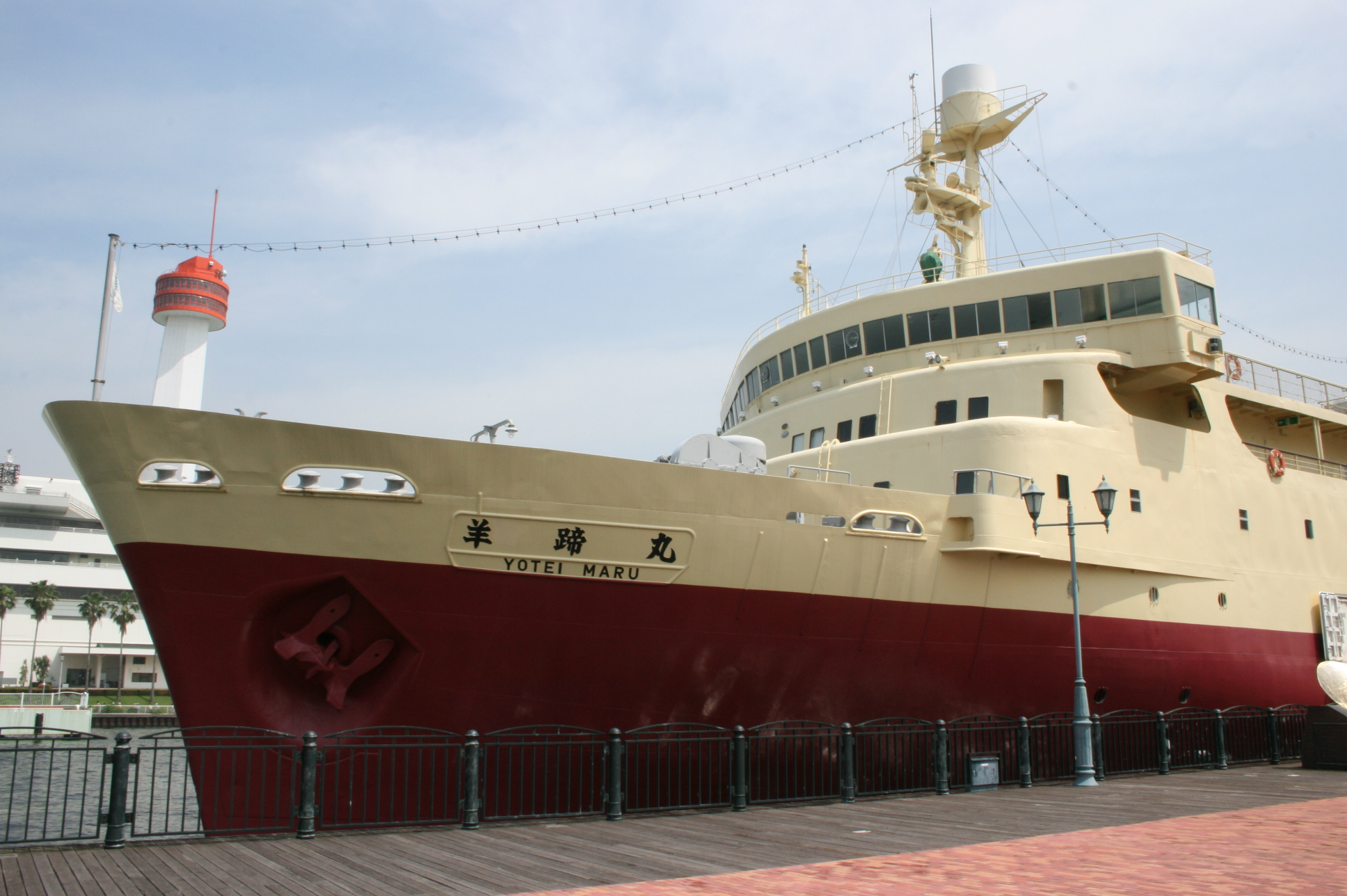
Seikan Yotei Maru (exhibit until 2011)

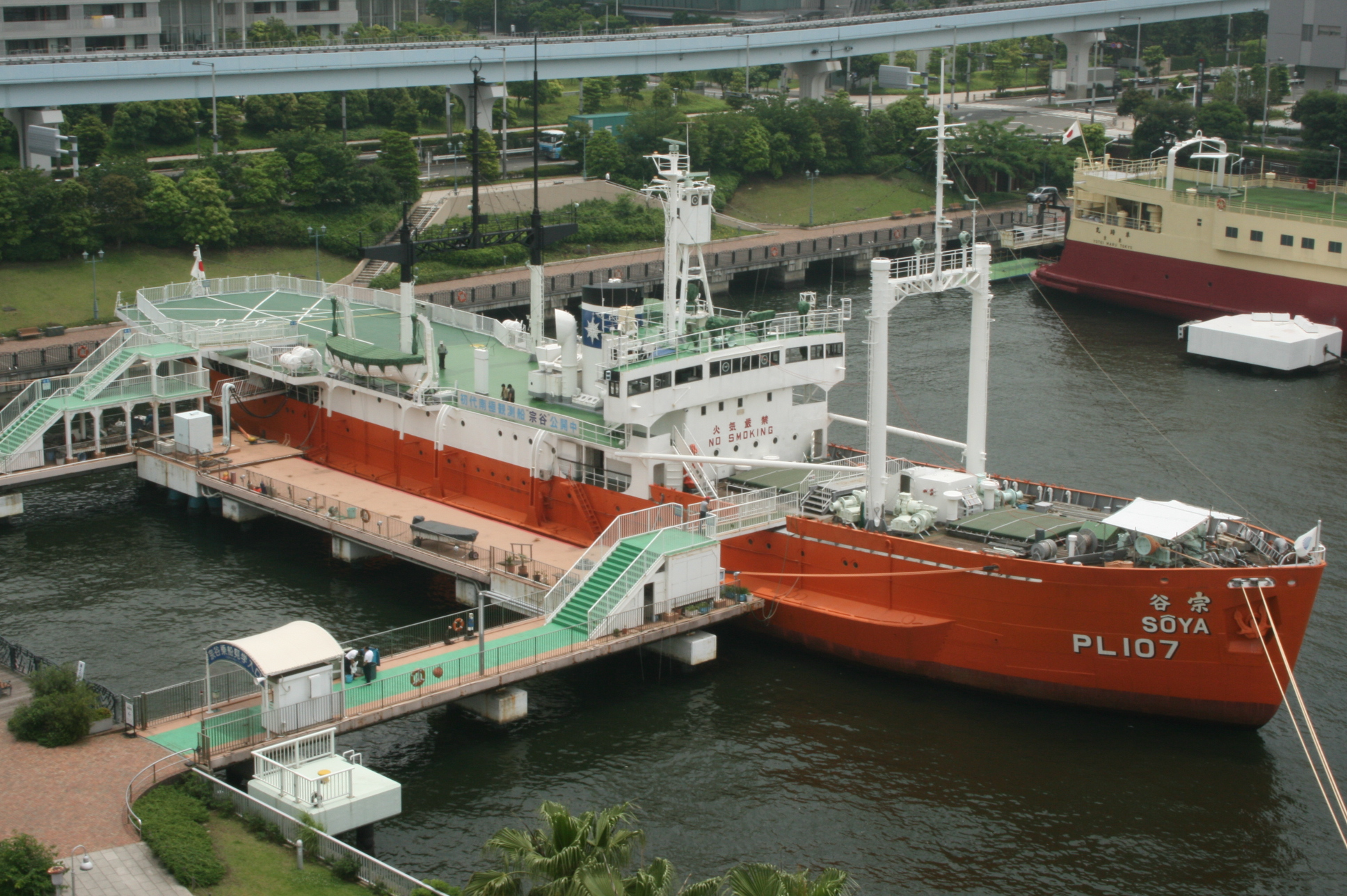
Icebreaker Sōya

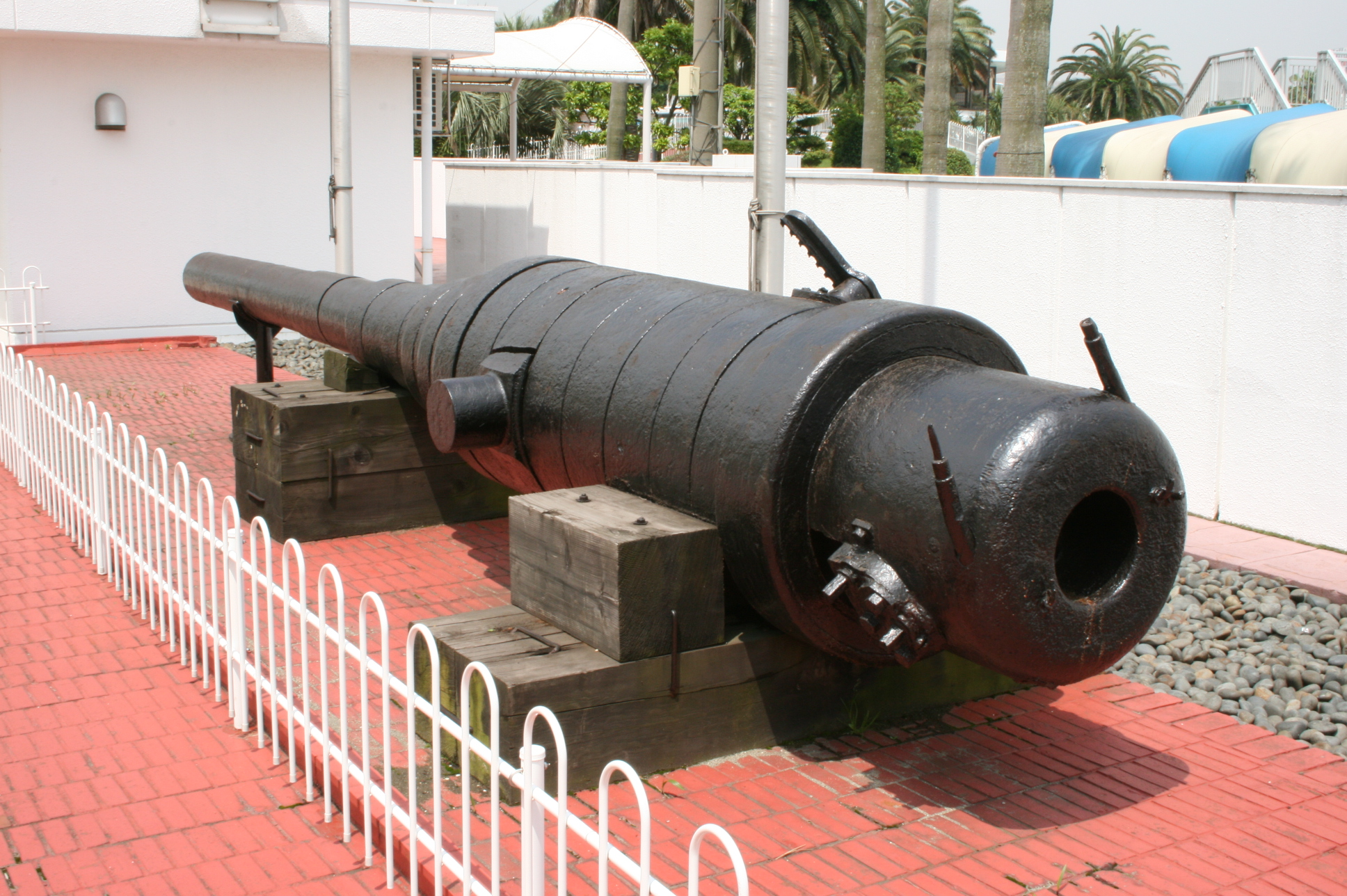
Cannon from the Russian cruiser Admiral Nakhimov.

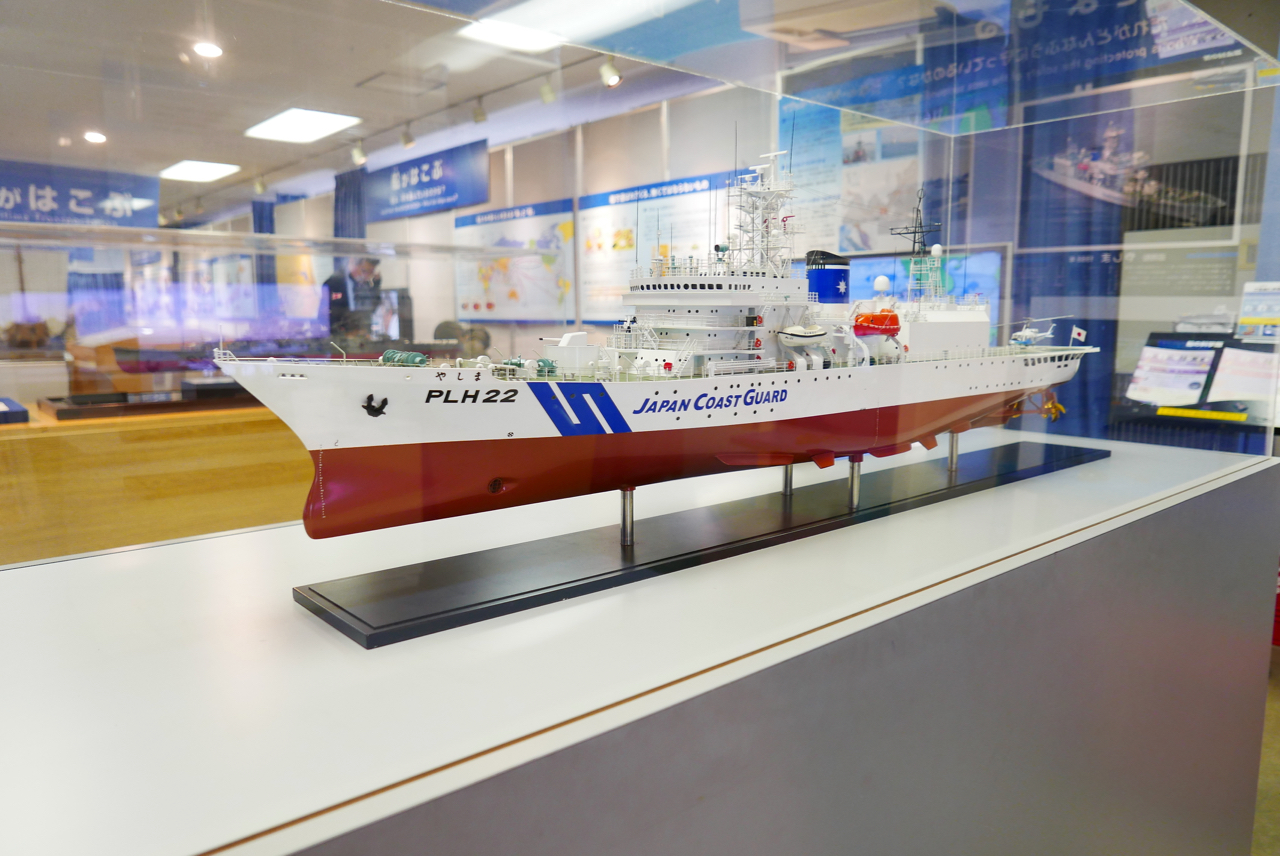
Model of Mizuho-class patrol vessel Yashima (PLH-22) of the Japan Coast Guard.

== See also ==
- List of museums in Tokyo
