= USS Grampus =

USS Grampus may refer to:

- USS Grampus (1821), a schooner built to suppress piracy and catch slavers, was launched in early August 1821, had a small part in the Amistad trials and was lost at sea in March 1843
- USS Grampus (1863), was a side-wheel steamer, originally named Ion, was used as a receiving ship for the Mississippi Squadron during the American Civil War
- USS Grampus (SS-4) was Submarine Torpedo Boat No. 4, which was renamed A-3 and patrolled Manila Bay during World War I
- USS Grampus (SP-1708), originally named Boothbay, was 1,708 tons and 126 feet long, built by Neafie and Levy, of Philadelphia. She was purchased from the Eastern Steamship Line of Boston, Massachusetts and commissioned 14 December 1917, at the Boston Navy Yard. Her name was changed to Grampus in November 1920. She was assigned to ferry service between the Washington Navy Yard, Indian Head, Maryland, and Dahlgren, Virginia. Grampus decommissioned 11 December 1930. Her name was struck from the Naval Vessel Register on 30 December 1930, and she was later sold to the Buxton Line of Norfolk, Virginia
- USS Grampus (SS-207), a Tambor-class submarine, was lost during World War II
- USS Grampus (SS-523), a Tench-class submarine, served through most of the Cold War, then was sold to Brazil

== See also ==
- CSS Grampus, a Confederate States Navy steamer
- HMS Grampus, ships of the British Royal Navy
- USFC Grampus, a fisheries research and fish-culture ship in commission with the United States Commission on Fish and Fisheries from 1886 to 1903 and as USFS Grampus with the United States Bureau of Fisheries from 1903 to 1917
