= Japanese minesweeper Keinan Maru =

History

Empire of Japan
- Name: Keinan Maru
- Builder: Kobeseikosho Harima Zosen Kojo
- Laid down: 25 January 1928
- Launched: 22 May 1928
- Completed: 3 August 1928
- Acquired: Requisitioned by Imperial Japanese Navy, 12 September 1941
- Stricken: 25 January 1945
- Identification: 33565
- Fate: Sunk 24 January 1945
- Notes: Call sign: JWNB

General characteristics
- Tonnage: 316 GRT

Keinan Maru (Japanese: 慶南丸 ) was an auxiliary minesweeper of the Imperial Japanese Navy during World War II.

== History ==
Keinan Maru was laid down on 25 January 1928 at the shipyard of Kobeseikosho Harima Zosen Kojo at the behest of shipping company, Nippon Suisan. She was launched on 22 May 1928 and completed 3 August 1928. On 12 September 1941, she was requisitioned by the Imperial Japanese Navy and converted to an auxiliary minesweeper under Reserve Lieutenant (Junior Grade) Okazaki Hiroshi (岡崎寛). She was assigned to the 5th Fleet's Minesweeper Division 17 along with Toshi Maru No. 5, Toshi Maru No. 8, and Misago Maru No. 11. Hiroshi served as captain until he was replaced by Reserve Lieutenant Sekiguchi Yoshitaka (關口吉孝) on May 25 1944. On 4 September 1944, Sekiguchi was replaced by Reserve Lieutenant Ouchi Masayuki (大内正之). On 24 January 1945, while in a three ship convoy with transport Yoneyama Maru and auxiliary minesweeper Showa Maru No. 7, she was attacked northeast of Iwo Jima (24°50′N 141°22′E) by Task Group 94.9 (under Rear Admiral Oscar C. Badger) and sunk by destroyers USS Dunlap and USS Fanning. All three ships were sunk. She was struck from the Navy list on 25 January 1945.
