= CH-4-class submarine chaser =

World War II naval ship of Japan

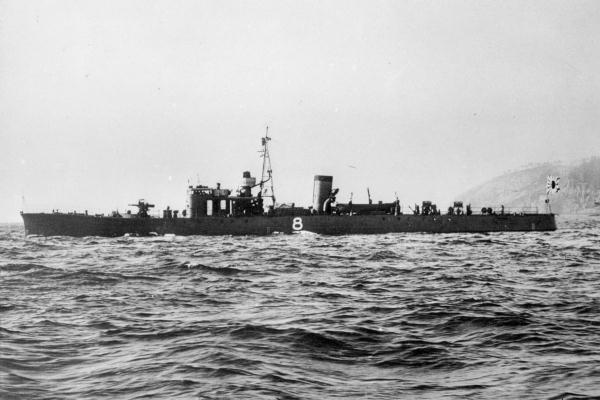
- No.8 in 1938

Class overview
- Name: No.4 class submarine chaser
- Builders: Tsurumi Iron Works (3); Mitsubishi Heavy Industries (2); Ōsaka Iron Works, (2); Tama Shipyards, (2)
- Operators: Imperial Japanese Navy; Republic of China Navy
- Preceded by: No.3 class
- Succeeded by: No.13 class
- Cost: 1,579,000 JPY
- Built: 1937 – 1939
- In commission: 1938 – 1960
- Planned: 9
- Completed: 9
- Lost: 7 (or 6)
- Retired: 2 (or 3)

General characteristics
- Type: Submarine chaser
- Displacement: 291 long tons (296 t) standard; 309 long tons (314 t) trial
- Length: 56.2 m (184 ft 5 in) overall; 55.5 m (182 ft 1 in) waterline
- Beam: 5.6 m (18 ft 4 in)
- Draught: 2.1 m (6 ft 11 in)
- Propulsion: 2 × Kampon Mk.22 Model 6 diesels, 2 shafts, 2,600 bhp
- Speed: 20.0 knots (23.0 mph; 37.0 km/h)
- Range: 2,000 nmi (3,700 km) at 14 kn (16 mph; 26 km/h)
- Complement: 59
- Armament: 2 × 40 mm heavy machine guns; 36 × depth charges; 2 × Type 94 depth charge projectors; 1 × depth charge thrower; 1 × Type 93 active sonar; 1 × Type 93 hydrophone; No.4, November 1944; 2 × 40 mm heavy machine guns; 3 × Type 96 25 mm AA guns; 36 × depth charges; 2 × Type 94 depth charge projectors; 2 × depth charge throwers (estimate); 1 × 13-Gō surface search radar; 1 × Type 3 active sonar; 1 × Type 93 hydrophone

The No.4 class submarine chaser (第四号型駆潜艇,, Dai 4 Gō-gata Kusentei) was a class of submarine chasers of the Imperial Japanese Navy (IJN), serving during and after World War II. Nine vessels were built between 1937 and 1939 under the Maru 3 Programme.

== Design ==
Developed under project number was K7, the No.4 class submarine chaser was an improved variant of the No.3 class, with increased freeboard. Other general features were the same as the No.3 class. Their design was elaborate, because the Navy Technical Department (Kampon) devoted itself to making them small. However, the design was not able to accept additional anti-aircraft guns and depth charges.

== Ships in class ==
Ship #	Ship	Builder	Laid down	Launched	Completed	Fate
62	No.7	Tsurumi Iron Works	30 October 1937	10 June 1938	15 November 1938	Sunk by aircraft at east of Car Nicobar on 11 April 1945.
63	No.8	Tama Shipyards	10 January 1938	9 August 1938	30 November 1938	Sunk by HMS Trenchant and HMS Terrapin at Strait of Malacca on 4 March 1945.
64	No.4	Ōsaka Iron Works, Sakurajima Factory	19 January 1938	13 September 1938	28 December 1938	Struck a naval mine and sank at Surabaya on 13 August 1945.
65	No.5	Mitsubishi, Yokohama Shipyard	25 January 1938	28 July 1938	6 December 1938	Scuttled by Royal Navy off Singapore on 11 July 1946. Decommissioned on 10 August 1946.
66	No.11	Tsurumi Iron Works	19 January 1938	28 June 1938	2 February 1939	Sunk by aircraft at west of Buka Island on 6 November 1943.
67	No.12	Tama Shipyards	15 July 1938	8 February 1939	30 April 1939	Probably sunk by USS Bluegill east of Mindanao on 13 August 1944. Decommissioned on 30 September 1945.
68	No.10	Ōsaka Iron Works, Sakurajima Factory	16 September 1938	31 January 1939	15 June 1939	Aground at Angaur on 2 May 1944. Later scuttled.
69	No.9	Mitsubishi, Yokohama Shipyard	10 May 1938	15 October 1938	9 May 1939	Decommissioned on 20 December 1945. Surrendered to Republic of China on 3 October 1947, and renamed Haida. Renamed Fuling (PC-107) in January 1951. Renamed Minjiang in 1954. Decommissioned in 1960.
70	No.6	Tsurumi Iron Works	5 July 1938	6 February 1939	20 May 1939	Heavy damaged by aircraft at Palau on 30 March 1944. Later sank in shallow water.

== Bibliography ==
- Ships of the World special issue Vol.45, Escort Vessels of the Imperial Japanese Navy, "Kaijinsha"., (Japan), February 1996
- The Maru Special, Japanese Naval Vessels No.49, Japanese submarine chasers and patrol boats, "Ushio Shobō". (Japan), March 1981
- "Japanese Subchasers". Combinedfleet.com.
