= USS Springer =

Submarine of the United States

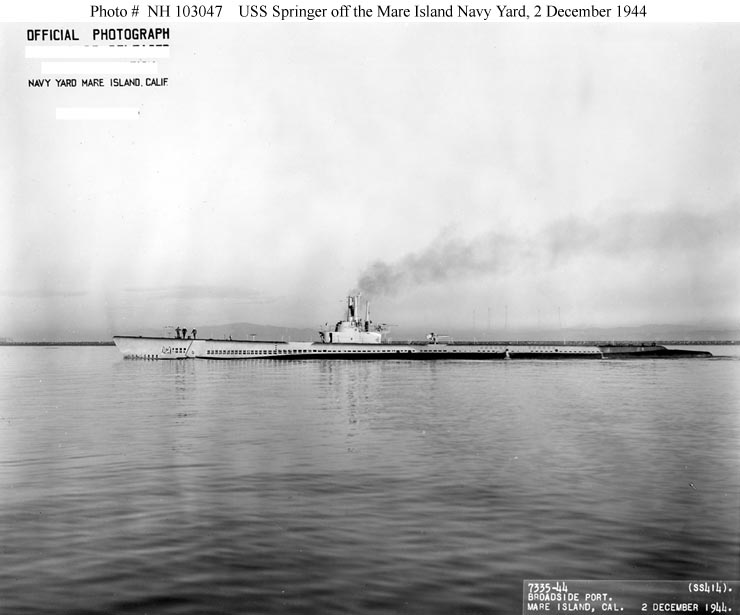

History

United States
- Name: Springer
- Builder: Mare Island Naval Shipyard
- Laid down: 30 October 1943
- Launched: 3 August 1944
- Commissioned: 18 October 1944
- Decommissioned: January 1947
- Recommissioned: 24 September 1960
- Decommissioned: 23 January 1961
- Stricken: 1 September 1972
- Identification: Hull number: SS-414
- Fate: Transferred to Chile, 23 January 1961, sold, 1 September 1972

Chile
- Name: Thomson
- Commissioned: 23 January 1961
- Identification: Pennant number: SS-22
- Fate: Stripped for spare parts and sold for scrapping after 1 September 1972

General characteristics
- Class & type: Balao-class diesel-electric submarine
- Displacement: 1,526 long tons (1,550 t) surfaced; 2,424 long tons (2,463 t) submerged
- Length: 311 ft 10 in (95.05 m)
- Beam: 27 ft 4 in (8.33 m)
- Draft: 16 ft 10 in (5.13 m) maximum
- Propulsion: 4 × Fairbanks-Morse Model 38D8-⅛ 10-cylinder opposed piston diesel engines driving electrical generators; 2 × 126-cell Sargo batteries; 4 × high-speed General Electric electric motors with reduction gears; two propellers; 5,400 shp (4.0 MW) surfaced; 2,740 shp (2.0 MW) submerged
- Speed: 20.25 knots (38 km/h) surfaced; 8.75 knots (16 km/h) submerged
- Range: 11,000 nautical miles (20,000 km) surfaced at 10 knots (19 km/h)
- Endurance: 48 hours at 2 knots (3.7 km/h) submerged; 75 days on patrol
- Test depth: 400 ft (120 m)
- Complement: 10 officers, 70–71 enlisted
- Armament: 10 × 21-inch (533 mm) torpedo tubes; 6 forward, 4 aft; 24 torpedoes; 1 × 5-inch (127 mm) / 25 caliber deck gun; Bofors 40 mm and Oerlikon 20 mm cannon

USS Springer (SS-414) was a Balao-class submarine of the United States Navy, named after the springer, a Grampus.

Springer was laid down on 3 October 1943 at Vallejo, Calif., by the Mare Island Navy Yard; launched on 3 August 1944, sponsored by Mrs. M. S. Tisdale; and commissioned on 18 October 1944.

Springer sailed for San Diego on 3 December to conduct sea trials and shakedown training. After availability, she departed Mare Island for Hawaii on 8 January 1945 and arrived at Pearl Harbor the following week. On 4 February, she steamed to Guam; topped off her stores and oil; and, on 17 February, sailed for the Ryukyu Islands to begin her first war patrol.

== First patrol, February – March 1945 ==
Springer rode out several heavy storms and was driven down many times by enemy aircraft, but she finally spotted two Japanese warships on 11 March. The ships were at a range of 22,000 yards (20 km), steaming at 17 knots (31 km/h), so the submarine surfaced to give chase. She was forced to submerge immediately by planes, and the pursuit was abandoned.

Later in the month, the submarine made radar contact with three ships, and she tracked the largest for three hours. When it was within torpedo range, she made a surface attack with four torpedoes. She scored two hits and the target began to burn. An hour later, Transport No. 18 was still afloat so she sank it with another torpedo. The submarine returned to Guam on 25 March and was refitted by Proteus (AS-19).

== Second patrol, April – May 1945 ==
Springer, Trepang (SS-412), and Raton (SS-270) sailed on 20 April for the Yellow Sea where they were to operate as a wolfpack. Eight days later, the pack checked Tomei Harbor on Fukue Shima. At 05:15, Springer sighted two ships hugging the coastline, but she found it impossible to close nearer than 6,500 yards (5,900 m). She heard 14 explosions at approximately 06:30. Trepang had sunk Transport No. 146 and was being depth charged by the victim's escort. Springer headed out of the harbor, and sighted the escort returning alone. At 08:30, the submarine launched three torpedoes. The target went dead in the water; and, as the crew was abandoning ship, Springer fired another torpedo. It hit under the target's No. 1 turret and blew off her bow. Two planes and two patrol craft approached, so Springer went deep and cleared the area, leaving Japan's Submarine Chaser No. 17 to sink.

Springer and Trepang contacted three targets on 30 April. The morning was very foggy, and the submarines decided to make a surface attack. Just as Springer reached a favorable firing position around noon, the fog suddenly lifted and left her exposed to a destroyer escort crossing her stern. The escort turned toward the submarine with all guns firing. Springer submerged, went deep, and rigged for silent running. Soon the first of 27 depth charges came down, and all were uncomfortably close. Speakers were knocked off the bulkhead, bulbs were smashed, and valves were lifted off their seats. When all was quiet, the submarine surfaced for a look as the fog closed in again. One more explosion was heard as Trepang sank the cargo ship Miho Maru.

On the night of 2 May, Springer attacked a ship and two small escorts with a spread of four torpedoes. She heard the first explode and then saw and heard two more hits which blew up and sank the frigate Ojika. The next night, she fired a spread of torpedoes at a ship making an antisubmarine sweep and sank the Japanese Coast Defense Vessel No. 25.

On 4 May, Springer sailed toward Honshū for lifeguard duty. No American pilots were sighted but, on 14 May, after watching a dogfight between a Japanese fighter and four of American carrier planes, she fished the dead enemy pilot from the water. After removing his papers, the submarine's commanding officer returned his body to the sea. The submarine concluded her patrol at Guam, on 18 May, and was refitted by Proteus.

== Third patrol, June – July 1945 ==
Springer sailed to Saipan on 16 June and began her third war patrol the next day. This was a combination offensive and life guard patrol in the Tokyo Bay area. On 26 June, she rescued eight men from a downed B-29 and transferred them to Tigrone (SS-419). Springer and Trepang were notified that there was another crew down about 50 miles (80 km) distant. They raced to the scene and Springer rescued one airman while Trepang picked up seven. The airman was transferred to Devilfish (SS-292) several days later. After an uneventful patrol in Kii Suido from 17 July to 23 July, the submarine sailed for Guam.

Springer was at Guam when hostilities with Japan ceased. She departed there on 17 August and headed for the west coast of the United States. She arrived at Mare Island on 5 September 1945 and shortly thereafter was attached to Mare Island Group, Pacific Reserve Fleet. In January 1947, her status was changed to in reserve, out of commission.

== Honors and awards ==
Springer earned three battle stars for World War II service.

== Thomson (SS-22) ==
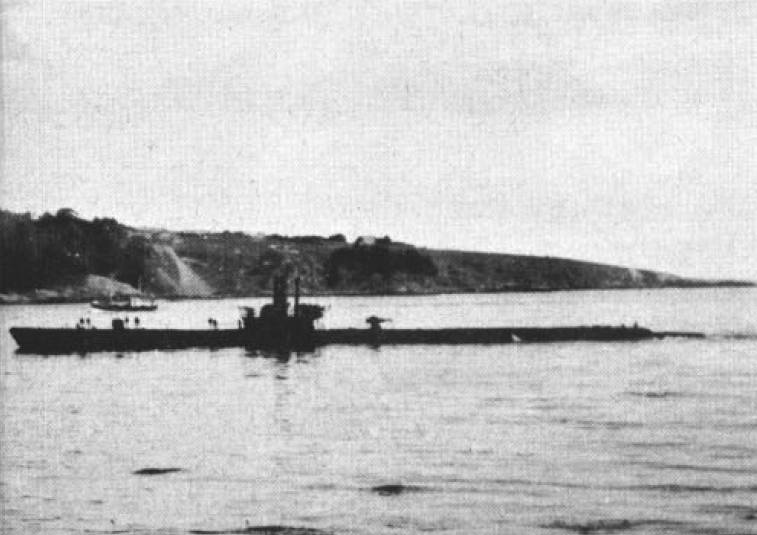
Springer as the Chilean Thompson (SS-22) in 1962.

In April 1960, Springer was moved from Mare Island to the San Francisco Naval Shipyard to be modernized in preparation for her transfer to the Republic of Chile. She was recommissioned on 24 September and the overhaul completed on 15 November. From 19 December 1960 to 19 January 1961, she held alongside and underway training for the Chilean crew.

Springer was decommissioned on 23 January 1961, transferred to the Republic of Chile, and commissioned in the Armada de Chile as Thomson (SS-22) on that date.

Springer was struck from the US Navy list on 1 September 1972, and sold to the government of Chile; she was stripped for spare parts for other submarines and her hulk sold for scrapping.
