= Japanese submarine chaser CH-16 =

History

Empire of Japan
- Name: CH-16
- Builder: Nippon Kokan K. K., Tsurumi
- Laid down: 22 April 1940
- Launched: 19 November 1940
- Completed: 5 April 1941
- Commissioned: 5 April 1941
- Stricken: 10 September 1944
- Home port: Yokosuka Naval District
- Fate: Sunk by air attack, 4 July 1944

General characteristics
- Class & type: No.13-class submarine chaser
- Displacement: 438 long tons (445 t) standard
- Length: 51 m (167 ft 4 in) o/a
- Beam: 6.7 m (22 ft 0 in)
- Draught: 2.75 m (9 ft 0 in)
- Propulsion: 2 × Kampon Mk.23A Model 8 diesels, 2 shafts, 1,700 bhp (1,268 kW)
- Speed: 16 knots (30 km/h; 18 mph)
- Range: 2,000 nmi (3,700 km) at 14 kn (26 km/h; 16 mph)
- Complement: 68
- Sensors & processing systems: 1 × Type 93 active sonar; 1 × Type 93 hydrophone
- Armament: 1 × 76.2 mm (3 in) L/40 AA gun; 2 × Type 93 13.2 mm (0.52 in) AA guns; 36 × Type 95 depth charges; 2 × Type 94 depth charge projectors; 1 × depth charge thrower

CH-16 was a No.13-class submarine chaser of the Imperial Japanese Navy during World War II.

== History ==
CH-16 was built by Nippon Kokan K. K. at their Tsurumi shipyard, laid down on 22 April 1940, launched on 19 November 1940, and completed and commissioned on 5 April 1941, and attached to the Yokosuka Naval District. She participated in the invasion of the Northern Philippines (Operation "M") in December 1941 where she was assigned to Sub Chaser Division 21 (SCD 21) led by Commodore Ota along with CH-4, CH-5, CH-6, CH-17, and CH-18. SCD 21 was at the time assigned to Rear Admiral Hirose Sueto's 2nd Base Force under Vice Admiral Ibō Takahashi's Third Fleet. In May 1942, she participated in the Battle of Midway (Operation "MI") where she was assigned to Miyamoto Sadachika's 16th Minesweeper Unit (along with auxiliary minesweepers Tama Maru No. 3, Tama Maru No. 5, Showa Maru No. 7, Showa Maru No. 8; submarine chasers CH-17, and CH-18; cargo ships Meiyo Maru and Yamafuku Maru; and auxiliary ammunition ship Soya).

On 4 July 1944, CH-16 was attacked and sunk off the Bonin Islands near Chichi-jima (27°10′N 110°10′E) by carrier-based aircraft from Rear Admiral Joseph J. Clark's Task Group 38.1 and Rear Admiral Ralph E. Davison's Task Group 38.4. CH-16 was struck from the Navy List on 10 September 1944.

== Additional references ==
- "Escort Vessels of the Imperial Japanese Navy special issue". Ships of the World (in Japanese). Vol. 45. Kaijinsha. February 1996.
- Model Art Extra No.340, Drawings of Imperial Japanese Naval Vessels Part-1 (in Japanese). Model Art Co. Ltd. October 1989.
- The Maru Special, Japanese Naval Vessels No.49, Japanese submarine chasers and patrol boats (in Japanese). Ushio Shobō. March 1981.
