= Japanese transport ship Yamafuku Maru =

History

Empire of Japan
- Name: Yamafuku Maru
- Builder: Osaka Iron Works K.K. shipyard in Sakurajima
- Laid down: 1939
- Launched: March 1940
- Sponsored by: Yamashita Kisen K.K.
- Completed: 10 July 1940
- Acquired: requisitioned by Imperial Japanese Navy, 15 May 1941
- Stricken: 5 January 1944
- Fate: Torpedoed and sunk, 28 November 1943

General characteristics
- Displacement: 4,928 long tons (5,007 t) standard
- Length: 369.8 ft (112.7 m) o/a
- Beam: 54.1 ft (16.5 m)
- Draught: 29.2 ft (8.9 m)
- Propulsion: One steam turbine 3,100 bhp (2,312 kW) and one 1 shaft 2,600 bhp (1,939 kW)
- Speed: 16 knots (30 km/h; 18 mph)

Yamafuku Maru was an auxiliary transport ship of the Imperial Japanese Navy during World War II. She served primarily as a troop transport and cargo ship during the war.

== History ==
Yamafuku Maru was laid down in 1939 at the Sakurajima shipyard of Osaka Iron Works K.K. at the behest of shipping company, Yamashita Kisen K.K. She was launched in March 1940 and completed 10 July 1940. On 15 May 1941, she was requisitioned as an auxiliary transport by the Imperial Japanese Navy and attached to the Yokosuka Naval District under Captain Honda Torao with Yokosuka as her homeport.

In January 1942, she served as a troop transport in the second echelon of the Ambon invasion force (consisting of transports Yamura Maru, Yamagiri Maru, Kirishima Maru, Hino Maru #5, and Katsuragi Maru) escorted by the 8th Destroyer Division (consisting of destroyers Amatsukaze, Tokitsukaze, Yukikaze, and Hatsukaze), and minesweepers W-9 and W-11 which delivered 5,300 personnel consisting of the Itō Detachment of the Imperial Japanese Army (IJA), under Major General Takeo Itō, comprising the 38th Division HQ and the 228th Infantry Regiment, along with marines from the 1st Kure Special Naval Landing Force (part of the China Area Fleet), and two platoons of the Sasebo SNLF under Rear Admiral Koichiro Hatakeyama. In May 1942, she participated in the Battle of Midway (Operation "MI") where she was assigned to Miyamoto Sadachika's 16th Minesweeper Unit (along with auxiliary minesweepers Tama Maru No. 3, Tama Maru No. 5, Showa Maru No. 7, Showa Maru No. 8; submarine chasers CH-16, CH-17, and CH-18; cargo ship Meiyo Maru; and auxiliary ammunition ship Soya).

On 23 November 1943, she departed Yokosuka for Truk as part of convoy No. 3123 with auxiliary transports Shoko Maru and Tatsutagawa Maru, IJN transport Manju Maru, cargo ship Shiganoura Maru, destroyer Oite, and auxiliary gunboat Choan Maru No. 2 Go. On 23/24 November, the convoy was unsuccessfully attacked 20 nautical miles (37 km; 23 mi) northwest of Hachijo-Jima by USS Snapper with all torpedoes missing. On 28 November 1943, the convoy was again attacked, this time USS Pargo and USS Snook 500 nautical miles (930 km; 580 mi) northwest of Guam; the initial attack was unsuccessful. Snook attacked again just before midnight and successfully hit and sank Yamafuku Maru with four torpedoes at (18°21′N 140°08′E) with 60 men lost. On 5 January 1944, she was struck from the Navy List.
