= Japanese minesweeper Showa Maru No. 7 =

Japanese auxiliary minesweeper of WW II

History

Empire of Japan
- Name: Showa Maru No. 7
- Builder: K.K. Osaka Tekkosho Honsha Kojo
- Laid down: 1 April 1936
- Launched: 24 July 1936
- Sponsored by: Nippon Suisan K.K.
- Completed: 31 August 1936
- Acquired: Requisitioned by Imperial Japanese Navy, 12 September 1941
- Decommissioned: 10 March 1945
- Home port: Tokyo
- Identification: 41979
- Fate: Sunk 24 January 1945
- Notes: Call sign: JIRK

General characteristics
- Tonnage: 264 GRT
- Length: 37.9 m (124 ft 4 in)
- Beam: 7.4 m (24 ft 3 in)
- Draught: 4.2 m (13 ft 9 in)

Showa Maru No. 7 (Japanese: 第七昭和丸) was an auxiliary minesweeper of the Imperial Japanese Navy during World War II.

== History ==
Showa Maru No. 7 was laid down on 1 April 1936 at the shipyard of K.K. Osaka Tekkosho Honsha Kojo at the behest of shipping company, Nippon Suisan K.K. She was launched on 24 July 1936 and completed 31 August 1936. On 12 September 1941, she was requisitioned by the Imperial Japanese Navy and converted to an auxiliary minesweeper under Reserve Lieutenant Takahashi Teruhisa (高橋輝藏). Takahashi served until 18 September 1941 when he was replaced by Reserve Lieutenant Terauchi Saburo (寺内三郎). Terauchi served until he was replaced by Reserve Lieutenant Tanaka Ginzo (田中銀造) on 1 May 1944. In May 1942, she participated in the Battle of Midway (Operation "MI") where she was assigned to Miyamoto Sadachika's 16th Minesweeper Unit (along with auxiliary minesweepers Tama Maru No. 3, Tama Maru No. 5, Showa Maru No. 8; submarine chasers CH-16, CH-17, and CH-18; cargo ships Meiyo Maru and Yamafuku Maru; and auxiliary ammunition ship Soya). On 24 January 1945, while in a three ship convoy with transport Yoneyama Maru and auxiliary minesweeper Keinan Maru, she was attacked northeast of Iwo Jima (24°50′N 141°22′E) by Task Group 94.9 (under Rear Admiral Oscar C. Badger) and sunk by the destroyers USS Dunlap and USS Fanning. All three ships were sunk. She was removed from the Navy list on 10 March 1945.
