= Japanese minesweeper Showa Maru No. 8 =

History

Empire of Japan
- Name: Showa Maru No. 8
- Builder: K.K. Osaka Tekkosho Honsha Kojo
- Laid down: 1 April 1936
- Launched: 24 July 1936
- Sponsored by: Nippon Suisan K.K.
- Completed: 31 August 1936
- Acquired: requisitioned by Imperial Japanese Navy, 12 September 1941
- Decommissioned: 10 March 1945
- Homeport: Tokyo
- Identification: 41980
- Notes: Call sign: JISK

General characteristics
- Tonnage: 264 GRT
- Length: 37.9 m (124 ft 4 in)
- Beam: 7.4 m (24 ft 3 in)
- Draught: 4.2 m (13 ft 9 in)

Showa Maru No. 8 (Japanese: 第八昭和丸) was an auxiliary minesweeper of the Imperial Japanese Navy during World War II.

== History ==
Showa Maru No. 8 was laid down on 1 April 1936 at the shipyard of K.K. Osaka Tekkosho Honsha Kojo at the behest of shipping company, Nippon Suisan K.K. She was launched on 24 July 1936 and completed 31 August 1936. On 12 September 1941, she was requisitioned by the Imperial Japanese Navy and converted to an auxiliary minesweeper under Reserve Lieutenant Kawai Iitsuka (河合彌). Kawai served until 23 August 1943 when he was replaced by Reserve Lieutenant Kusegawa Shinji (久瀬川晋二). In May 1942, she participated in the Battle of Midway (Operation "MI") where she was assigned to Miyamoto Sadachika's 16th Minesweeper Unit (along with auxiliary minesweepers Tama Maru No. 3, Tama Maru No. 5, Showa Maru No. 7; submarine chasers CH-16, CH-17, and CH-18; cargo ships Meiyo Maru and Yamafuku Maru; and auxiliary ammunition ship Soya). Her fate is uncertain.
