= Hikoshima =

Island in Yamaguchi, Japan

Native name: 彦島 Hikoshima
- Location within Japan

Geography
- Location: East China Sea
- Coordinates: 33°56′14″N 130°54′52″E
- Area: 10.58 km^{2} (4.08 sq mi)
- Length: 5.7 km (3.54 mi)
- Width: 2 km (1.2 mi)
- Highest elevation: 111.8 m (366.8 ft)
- Highest point: mount 大山 (Ooyama)

Administration
- Japan
- Prefecture: Yamaguchi Prefecture
- city: Shimonoseki

Demographics
- Population: 30182 (2011)
- Pop. density: 2,853/km^{2} (7389/sq mi)
- Ethnic groups: Japanese

Hikoshima (彦島) (also called Hikishima (引島) in Nihon Shoki) is an island on the south-west tip of Honshu, Japan.

== Geography ==
The island is irregularly shaped and hilly. The strait, as narrow as 40 metres (44 yd), separates the island from the main island of Honshu. The parts of sprawling city of Shimonoseki occupy most of the island, making it the most populous minor island in Yamaguchi Prefecture, albeit only sixth in size by area.

== Transportation ==
The island is connected to the Japanese mainland of Honshu by three bridges, one above a ship lock. The Kanmon Railway Tunnel connects the island to Kyushu, but the San'yō Main Line has no stop-overs on island, the nearest station being Shimonoseki Station in the downtown area. Also, there is a bridge connection to the small 竹ノ子島 (Takenoko-jima) on the northwestern tip of the Hikoshima.

== History ==
The island was inhabited since prehistory, as evidenced by petroglyphs found in 1918. Following the Battle of Dan-no-ura, the refugees from the Taira clan has migrated to island and set the basis for the local agriculture. The island was an important site of Shimonoseki Campaign in 1863-1864 when it was much feared the island would become the Japanese variant of Hong Kong. The island industrialization began in 1924 with the building of ammonium sulphate plant with German license in 1924. Currently island is heavily populated and industrialized, including a shipyard and a titanium & zinc smelter.

== Attractions ==
- Fossil-rich cliffs

== Notable residents ==
- Michiyo Kogure - film actress
- Shinji Yamashita - actor
- Atsushi Tamura - comedian
- Shinobu Otowa - enka singer
- Hideo Fujimoto - baseball pitcher
- Masashi Nishiyama - judoka

== See also ==
- List of islands of Japan by area
- List of islands by population density
- Shimonoseki
