= Patrol torpedo boat PT-490 =

Torpedo boat of the United States Navy

History

United States
- Name: PT-490
- Builder: Electric Boat Company
- Laid down: 7 August 1943
- Launched: 29 October 1943
- Sponsored by: United States Navy
- Completed: 29 November 1943
- Commissioned: 2 December 1943
- Nickname(s): "Little Butch"
- Fate: Sold, May 1946
- Notes: Call sign: NEIW

General characteristics
- Class & type: Patrol torpedo boat
- Tonnage: 40 gross register tons
- Length: 77 feet o/a
- Beam: 19 feet 11 inches
- Height: 4 feet 6 inches
- Propulsion: Three 1,500 hp Packard V12 M2500 gasoline engines, three shafts.
- Armament: Two twin .50 caliber Browning M2 machine guns; Two .303 caliber Lewis machine guns; 2 21" torpedo tubes; Four torpedoes

Service record

PT-490 was a PT-20-class motor torpedo boat of the United States Navy that served during World War II.

== History ==
PT-490 was authorized by the United States Navy and laid down on 7 August 1943 at the Elco Works of the Electric Launch Company (now Electric Boat Company) at their Bayonne, New Jersey shipyard; launched on 29 October 1943; and completed on 29 November 1943. On 2 December 1943, she was commissioned and attached to Motor Torpedo Boat Squadron 33 (MTBRon 33) under the command of Lt. JG John M. McElfresh and assigned to patrol in the Southwest Pacific. On 12 December 1944, while patrolling off the coast of Leyte Island with PT-492, they spotted and sunk the destroyer Uzuki 50 miles (80 km) northeast of Cebu at 11°03′N 124°23′E.

She survived the war. In May 1946, she was transferred to the Foreign Liquidation Commission of the United States State Department and sold. Her fate is unknown.
