= Japanese destroyer Uzuki (1925) =

Destroyer of the Imperial Japanese Navy

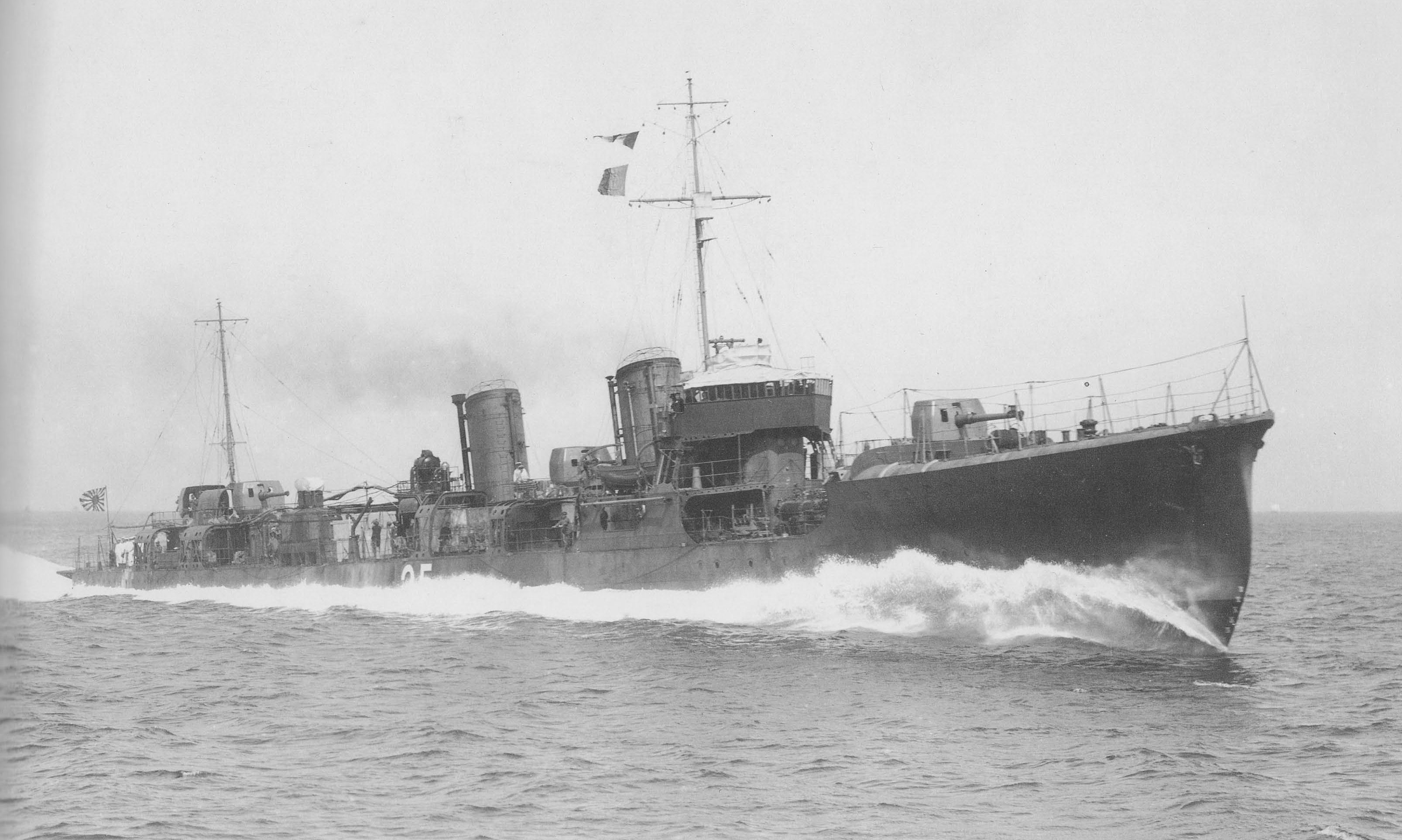
- Uzuki in August 1926

History

Empire of Japan
- Name: Uzuki
- Namesake: April
- Builder: Ishikawajima Shipyards
- Laid down: 11 January 1924 as Destroyer No. 25
- Launched: 15 October 1925
- Completed: 14 September 1926
- Renamed: As Uzuki, 1 August 1928
- Stricken: 10 January 1945
- Fate: Sunk by PT boats on 12 December 1944

General characteristics
- Class & type: Mutsuki-class destroyer
- Displacement: 1,336 t (1,315 long tons) (normal); 1,800 t (1,772 long tons) (deep load)
- Length: 97.54 m (320 ft 0 in) (pp); 102.4 m (335 ft 11 in) (o/a)
- Beam: 9.16 m (30 ft 1 in)
- Draft: 2.96 m (9 ft 9 in)
- Installed power: 38,500 shp (28,700 kW); 4 × Kampon water-tube boilers
- Propulsion: 2 shafts; 2 × Kampon geared steam turbines
- Speed: 37.25 knots (68.99 km/h; 42.87 mph)
- Range: 4,000 nmi (7,400 km; 4,600 mi) at 15 knots (28 km/h; 17 mph)
- Complement: 150
- Armament: 4 × 12 cm (4.7 in) Type 3 guns; 2 × triple 61 cm (24 in) torpedo tubes; 18 × depth charges; 16 × mines

Service record
- Part of: Destroyer Division 23
- Operations: Second Sino-Japanese War; Invasion of Guam; Solomon Islands campaign; Battle of the Philippine Sea

Uzuki (卯月, "April") was one of twelve Mutsuki-class destroyers built for the Imperial Japanese Navy (IJN) during the 1920s. During the Pacific War, she participated in the Battle of Wake Island in December 1941 and the occupations of New Guinea and the Solomon Islands in early 1942.

== History ==
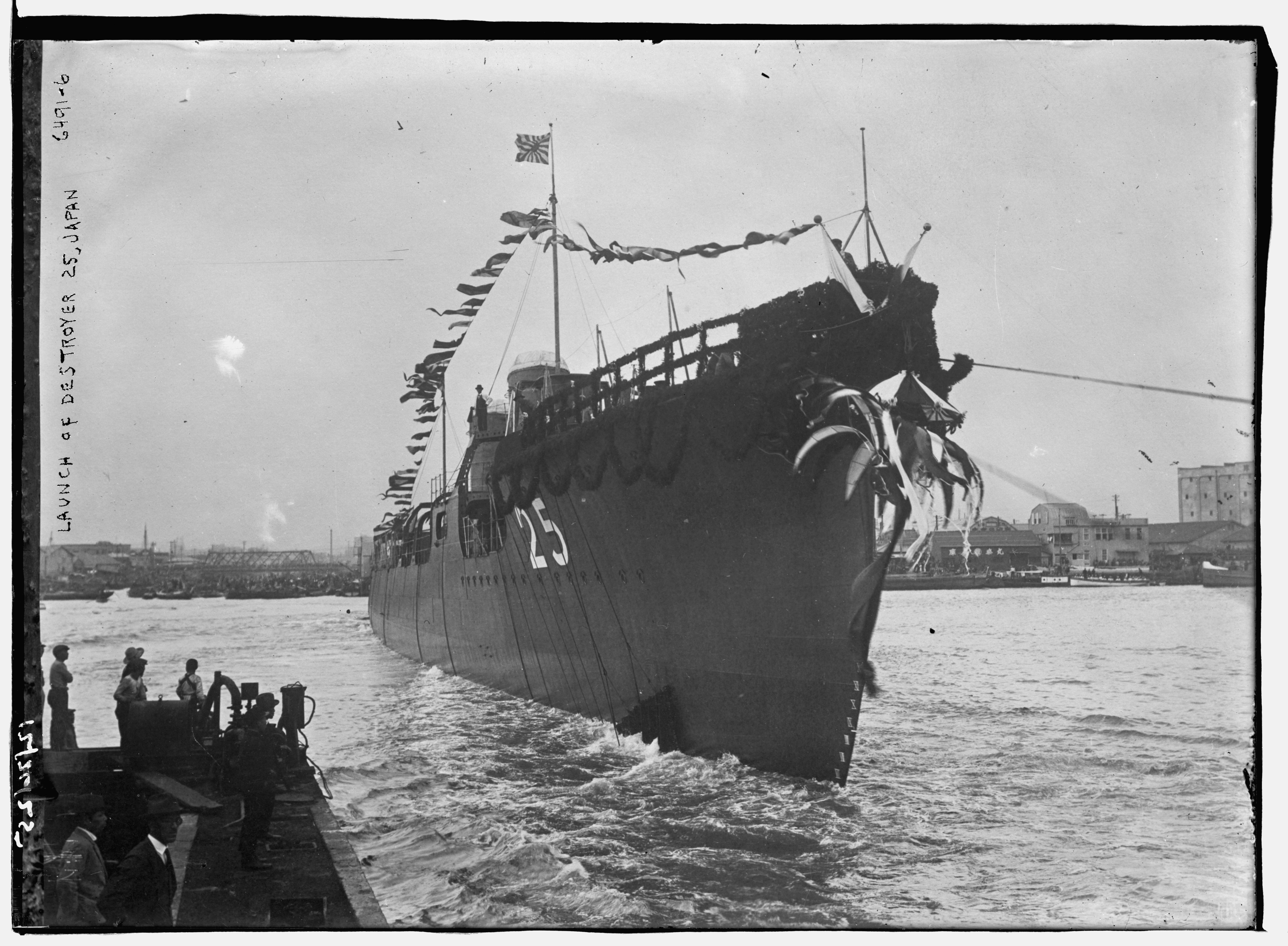
Launching of Uzuki (then known as Destroyer No. 25) on 15 October 1925 at Ishikawajima Shipyard, Tokyo, Japan.

Construction of the Mutsuki-class destroyers was authorized as part of the Imperial Japanese Navy's build up from fiscal 1923 of ships not covered by the Washington Naval Treaty. The class was a follow-on to the earlier Minekaze and Kamikaze-class destroyers, with which they shared many common design characteristics. Uzuki, built at the Ishikawajima Shipyards in Tokyo, was laid down on 11 January 1924, launched on 15 October 1925 and commissioned on 14 September 1926. Originally commissioned simply as Destroyer No. 25, the ship was assigned the name Uzuki on 1 August 1928.

In the late 1930s, Uzuki participated in combat actions in the Second Sino-Japanese War, covering the landings of Japanese troops in central and southern China, and the Invasion of French Indochina.

=== World War II history ===
At the time of the attack on Pearl Harbor, Uzuki was part of Desron 23 under Carrier Division 2 in the IJN 1st Air Fleet, and deployed from Hahajima in the Ogasawara Islands as part of the Japanese invasion force for the Invasion of Guam. She returned to Truk in early January 1942 to covering the landings of Japanese forces during "Operation R" at Kavieng, New Ireland on 23 January, returning to Truk one month later. In March, Uzuki assisted in covering landings of Japanese forces during "Operation SR" in the northern Solomon Islands, Lae and Admiralty Islands. The destroyer was reassigned to the IJN 4th Fleet on 10 April. During the Battle of the Coral Sea from 7–8 May 1942, Uzuki was assigned to escort the tanker Hoyo Maru in the Shortlands area, and returned to Sasebo Naval Arsenal for refitting on 28 May. By the end of June, Uzuki was based at Truk, and assigned to escort convoys carrying airfield construction crews from Truk to Bougainville and Guadalcanal, and patrols around Rabaul. During the invasion of Buka (21–22 July), Uzuki was strafed by Allied aircraft, with loss of 16 crewmen. On 11 August, Uzuki sortied from Rabaul to rescue the survivors of the cruiser Kako. At the end of August, while on a "Tokyo Express" transport run to Guadalcanal, Uzuki suffered damage from a near miss in an attack by USAAF B-17 Flying Fortress bombers, and returned via Rabaul, Truk and Saipan back to Sasebo for repairs on 14 September.

Uzuki was assigned to the IJN 8th Fleet on 1 December 1942, and escorted the aircraft carrier Chūyō from Yokosuka to Truk, and a troop convoy from Truk to Rabaul at the end of the year. However, at Rabaul on 25 December 1942, Uzuki suffered heavy damage in a collision with the torpedoed transport Nankai Maru and was taken in tow by the destroyers Ariake and Urakaze back to Rabaul for emergency repairs. While at Rabaul, the ship was further damaged in an air raid on 5 January 1943. The destroyer Suzukaze towed Uzuki to Truk for further repairs, and then Uzuki returned to Sasebo under her own power by 3 July. Once repairs were completed in mid-October, Uzuki returned to Truk and escorted the cruisers Kiso and Tama, both loaded with troops, back to Rabaul. On 23–24 October, Uzuki sortied to Jacquinot Bay on New Britain to rescue the survivors of her sister ship Mochizuki. Uzuki continued to make "Tokyo Express" transport runs throughout the Solomon Islands to the end of November. On 24–25 November, Uzuki engaged United States Navy destroyers at the Battle of Cape St. George, during the Japanese evacuation of Buka, but without damage. In December, Uzuki was assigned to escort tankers from Rabaul to Truk and Palau and back.

In January 1944, Uzuki escorted the cruiser Nagara back to Japan. After refit at Sasebo Naval Arsenal, Uzuki escorted troop convoys from Yokosuka to Palau, Yap, Saipan and Truk through the end of June. During the Battle of the Philippine Sea (19–20 June), Uzuki was part of the Second Supply Force. On 20 June, she rescued the crew of the fleet oiler Genyo Maru, and sank the crippled ship with gunfire. Uzuki continued to escort convoys from Kure to Manila and Singapore to the middle of November. On 18 July, she was assigned to the Combined Fleet, and on 20 November, was reassigned to the IJN 5th Fleet.

On 12 December, while escorting a troop convoy from Manila to Ormoc, Uzuki was torpedoed by the PT boats PT-490 and PT-492, 50 miles (80 km) northeast of Cebu at 11°03′N 124°23′E, exploding and sinking with the loss of 170 crew including Lieutenant Commander Watanabe, 59 survivors.

Uzuki was struck from the navy list on 10 January 1945.
