= Japanese submarine chaser CH-18 =

Submarine chaser of the Imperial Japanese Navy

History

Empire of Japan
- Name: CH-18
- Builder: Nippon Kokan K. K., Tsurumi
- Laid down: 1941
- Launched: 23 April 1941
- Completed: 31 July 1941
- Commissioned: 31 July 1941
- Stricken: 10 March 1945
- Fate: Sunk by aircraft, 30 December 1944

General characteristics
- Class & type: No.13-class submarine chaser
- Displacement: 438 long tons (445 t) standard
- Length: 51 m (167 ft 4 in) o/a
- Beam: 6.7 m (22 ft 0 in)
- Draught: 2.75 m (9 ft 0 in)
- Propulsion: 2 × Kampon Mk.23A Model 8 diesels, 2 shafts, 1,700 bhp (1,268 kW)
- Speed: 16 knots (30 km/h; 18 mph)
- Range: 2,000 nmi (3,700 km) at 14 kn (26 km/h; 16 mph)
- Complement: 68
- Sensors & processing systems: 1 × Type 93 active sonar; 1 × Type 93 hydrophone
- Armament: 1 × 76.2 mm (3 in) L/40 AA gun; 2 × Type 93 13.2 mm (0.52 in) AA guns; 36 × Type 95 depth charges; 2 × Type 94 depth charge projectors; 1 × depth charge thrower

CH-18 was a No.13-class submarine chaser of the Imperial Japanese Navy during World War II.

== History ==
CH-18 was laid down by Nippon Kokan K. K. at their Tsurumi Shipyard in 1941, launched on 23 April 1941, and completed and commissioned on 31 July 1941. In May 1942, she participated in the Battle of Midway (Operation "MI") where she was assigned to Miyamoto Sadachika's 16th Minesweeper Unit (along with auxiliary minesweepers Tama Maru No. 3, Tama Maru No. 5, Showa Maru No. 7, Showa Maru No. 8; submarine chasers CH-16, and CH-17; cargo ships Meiyo Maru and Yamafuku Maru; and auxiliary ammunition ship Soya).

On 30 December 1944, she was attacked and sunk near Santiago Island, Luzon by 26 land-based aircraft of the United States Fifth Air Force consisting of B-25 Mitchell medium bombers, A-20 Havoc light bombers, and P-40 Warhawk fighters (17°18′N 119°25′E) while conducting escort duty.

CH-18 was struck from the Navy List on 10 March 1945.

== Additional references ==
- "Escort Vessels of the Imperial Japanese Navy special issue". Ships of the World (in Japanese). Vol. 45. Kaijinsha. February 1996.
- Model Art Extra No.340, Drawings of Imperial Japanese Naval Vessels Part-1 (in Japanese). Model Art Co. Ltd. October 1989.
- The Maru Special, Japanese Naval Vessels No.49, Japanese submarine chasers and patrol boats (in Japanese). Ushio Shobō. March 1981.
