= CSS Grampus =

Coordinates: 36.5626°N 89.5612°W

History

Confederate States
- Name: Grampus
- Launched: 1856
- Acquired: 1862
- Fate: Scuttled, 7 April 1862

General characteristics
- Type: Gunboat
- Tonnage: 352 long tons (358 t)
- Propulsion: Steam engine, stern-wheel
- Armament: 2 × brass 12-pounders

CSS Grampus was a stern-wheel river steamer built in 1856 at McKeesport, Pennsylvania, for civilian employment. Taken by the Confederate Army in early 1862, she served as a scout boat and transport on the Mississippi River. Late in March 1862, Captain Marsh Miller in command, she took an active part in the defense of Island No. 10 where the Confederates finally sank her to prevent capture, on 7 April. The Union Gunboat Flotilla set out to raise her during May 1862 and did so, but she is believed to be the Grampus No. 2 which burned the following 11 January.
