= Japanese invasion of Lingayen Gulf =

Part of the Philippines campaign of WW2

- Part of the Philippines campaign (1941–1942), Pacific Theater
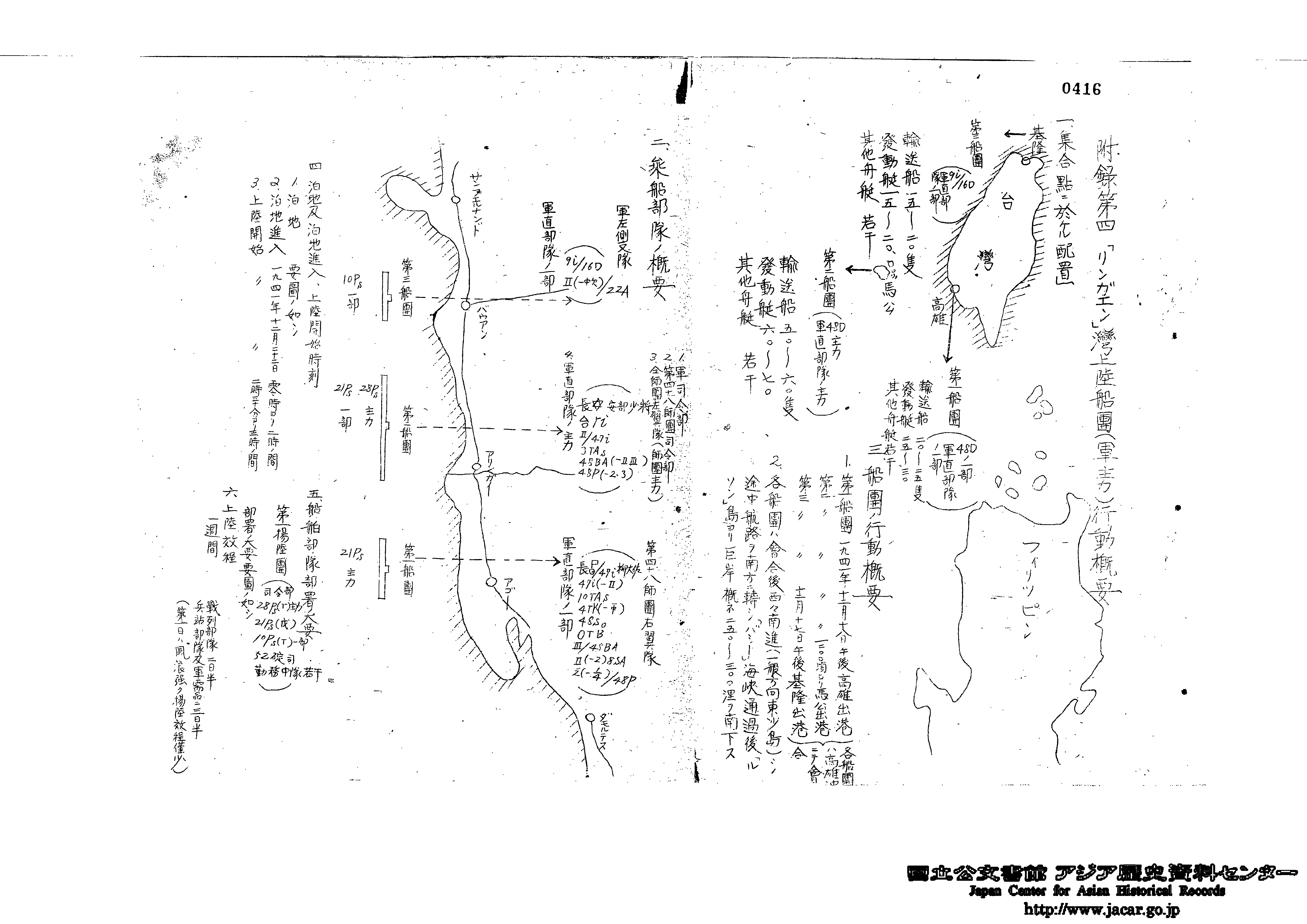
- Japanese Map of the Invasion of Lingayen Gulf
| Date | 21–23 December 1941 |
| Location | Luzon, Philippines |
| Result | Japanese victory |

Belligerents
| Japan | United States: Philippines |

Units involved
| Imperial Japanese Army; Imperial Japanese Navy | Philippine Commonwealth Army; Philippine Scouts |

The Japanese invasion of Lingayen Gulf was the key point in the Japanese plan for the conquest of the Philippines. Preparations had already been made by the Attack on Clark Field and the landings of Japanese forces at five points in northern and southern Luzon and Mindanao in early/mid December 1941, with the IJAAF seizing air fields and basing aircraft for ground support, and the Imperial Japanese Navy establishing seaplane bases at the Camiguin Island, Legaspi, and Davao. The main landing of Japanese forces targeted Lingayen Gulf, with its proximity to the Philippine capital of Manila, and Lamon Bay on the opposite coast to the south.

== The Japanese order of battle ==
The Japanese invasion force of 43,110 men was under the overall command of the IJA 14th Area Army under General Masaharu Homma. The force contained the IJA 48th Division (less the Tanaka and Kanno Detachments which had already landed in the invasions of Aparri and Vigan) under Lt General Yuitsu Tsuchihashi. A newly formed division from Taiwan, it lacked combat experience, but it was the best equipped and motorized division in the Japanese Army. It also contained elements of the IJA 16th Division including the 4th and 7th Tank Regiments with a total of between 80 and 100 tanks, and by three field artillery regiments.

The invasion force sailed in three convoys, each of which constituted a separate task force with a separate landing point and objective. The Japanese maintained strict internal secrecy and only senior commanders were aware of the targets.

=== First task force ===
The first task force departed from Takao on 18 December 1941 carrying the 47th Infantry Regiment (consisting of 3,845 men under Colonel Shizuo Yamada (山田鉄二郎), the 4th Tank Regiment (with 32 x Type 95 Ha-Go light tanks), the 8th Field Artillery Regiment (with 16 x Type 91 10 cm howitzers), and the 48th Reconnaissance Regiment (a 600-man scouting force) in 23 transports in four organized groups:

- 1st Transport Group: Buyo Maru, Chojun Maru, Havre Maru, Nichimei Maru, and Shunko Maru
- 2nd Transport Group: Brazil Maru, Genkai Maru, Maebishi Maru, Pacific Maru, Taizan Maru, Sydney Maru
- 3rd Transport Group: Hokumei Maru, Konzan Maru, Ryunan Maru, Tajima Maru, Tempei Maru, Tokiwa Maru
- 4th Transport Group: Erie Maru, Hague Maru, Oyo Maru, Taketoyo Maru, Tsuyama Maru, Yamagiku Maru)

The combined force carried a contingent of landing craft (37 Shōhatsu, 27 Daihatsu, and 10 Toku Daihatsu). The task force was escorted by:

- Crusier Natori, flagship
- 5th Destroyer Division (Asakaze, Harukaze, Hatakaze, Matsukaze)
- 22nd Destroyer Division (Fumizuki. Minazuki, Nagatsuki, Satsuki)
- 1st Subchaser Division (CH-1, CH-2, CH-3)
- 2nd Subchaser Division (CH-13, CH-14, CH-15)
- 2 minesweepers (W-15, W-16)
- 5 sea trucks

=== Second task force ===
The second task force with the 1st Taiwan Regiment and the 2nd Taiwan Regiment of the 48th Division and 7th Tank Regiment (with 32 x Type 89 medium tanks) in 28 transports departed at noon 18 December from Mako in the Pescadores Islands.

- 5th Transport Group: Alaska Maru, Columbia Maru, Genoa Maru, Kyokko Maru, Mizuho Maru, Taizan Maru, Teikai Maru
- 6th Transport Group: Arizona Maru, Atlas Maru, Hoeisan Maru, Koyo Maru, Nichiwa Maru, Reiyo Maru, Tsushima Maru
- 7th Transport Group: Aden Maru, Asaka Maru, Hamburg Maru, Heian Maru, Kenzan Maru, Miyadono Maru, Satsuma Maru
- 8th Transport Group: Anyo Maru, Atsuta Maru, Ginyo Maru, Hozugawa Maru, Lima Maru, Mansei Maru, Somodono Maru

The combined force carried a contingent of landing craft (25 Shōhatsu, 25 Daihatsu, and 5 Toku Daihatsu). The task force was escorted by:

- Crusier Naka, flagship
- 2nd Destroyer Division (Harusame, Murasame, Samidare, Yudachi)
- 9th Destroyer Division (Asagumo, Minegumo, Natsugumo, Yamagumo)
- 21st Subchaser Division (CH-4, CH-5, CH-6, CH-16, CH-17, CH-18)
- 31st Subchaser Division (CH-10, CH-11, CH-12)
- 6 minesweepers (W-9, W-10, W-11, W-12, W-17, W-18)
- 5 sea trucks

=== Third task force ===
The third task force included the Kanijima deachment, a brigade sized element of the 16th Division, the 9th Kyoto Infantry Regiment (mechanized) headed by Colonel Shigeji Yamada, the 8th Field Artillary Regiment (with 16 x Type 91 10 cm howitzers), and the 48th Engineering Regiment departed Kirun on Taiwan consisting of 21 transports on the evening of 17 December.

- 9th Transport Group: Biyo Maru, Himalaya Maru, Jinsan Maru, Konsan Maru, Minryu Maru, Momoyama Maru
- 10th Transport Group: Hakushika Maru, Hakushin Maru, Kusuyama Maru, Montreal Maru, Penang Maru, Takaoka Maru
- 11th Transport Group: Rakuyo Maru, Uchide Maru, Wales Maru, Yae Maru
- 12th Transport Group: Argun Maru, Hayo Maru, Kashu Maru, Tamishima Maru, Yoneyama Maru

The combined force carried a contingent of landing craft (11 Shōhatsu and 11 Daihatsu). The task force was escorted by:

- 1 destroyer Yamagumo
- 1 minelayer: Wakataka
- 2 coastal minesweepers: Nichiyu Maru, Tatsuharu Maru
- 2 surveying ships: Kirun Maru, Kyodo Maru No. 36
- 5 sea trucks

=== Distant cover ===
Distant cover was provided by the IJN 3rd Fleet under Vice Admiral Ibo Takahashi consisting of two heavy cruisers (Ashigara as flagship, Maya), one light cruiser (Kuma), and two destroyers (Asakaze, Matsukaze); which were later joined by units of Vice Admiral Nobutake Kondo’s 2nd Fleet.

== The landings ==
The Takao convoy was scheduled to land at Agoo, a small village in La Union Province on the eastern shore of Lingayen Gulf beginning 0500 on 22 December. The Mako convoy was intended to start landing at 0550 hours at Caba, seven miles north of Agoo, and the Kamijima Detachment was to land at Bauang, seven miles north of Caba from 0730 hours. This was intended to give the IJA 14th Army a fifteen mile wide landing zone along the narrow coastal plain just north of the central plains of Luzon and protected from flanking counterattack from the east by the Cordillera Mountains. Once ashore, the troops were to move inland without consolidating the landing zone. The Kamijima Detachment in particular was to strike north to occupy San Fernando, and Baguio and to consolidate with the Vigan invasion force under Colonel Tanaka which was moving south along the coast. The remaining two forces were to press south past Rosario to secure the bank of the Agno River, the first major geographic obstacle on the road to Manila.

However, the landing operations did not proceed smoothly as planned. Hampered by bad weather, the convoy overshot its target and anchored four miles further south than intended. Heavy seas made landing difficult and a number of landing craft were destroyed. Rather than the pinpoint landings planned, the Japanese forces found themselves spread apart over a wide area of the landing zone and unable to land the tanks and heavy equipment as planned.

== The American response ==
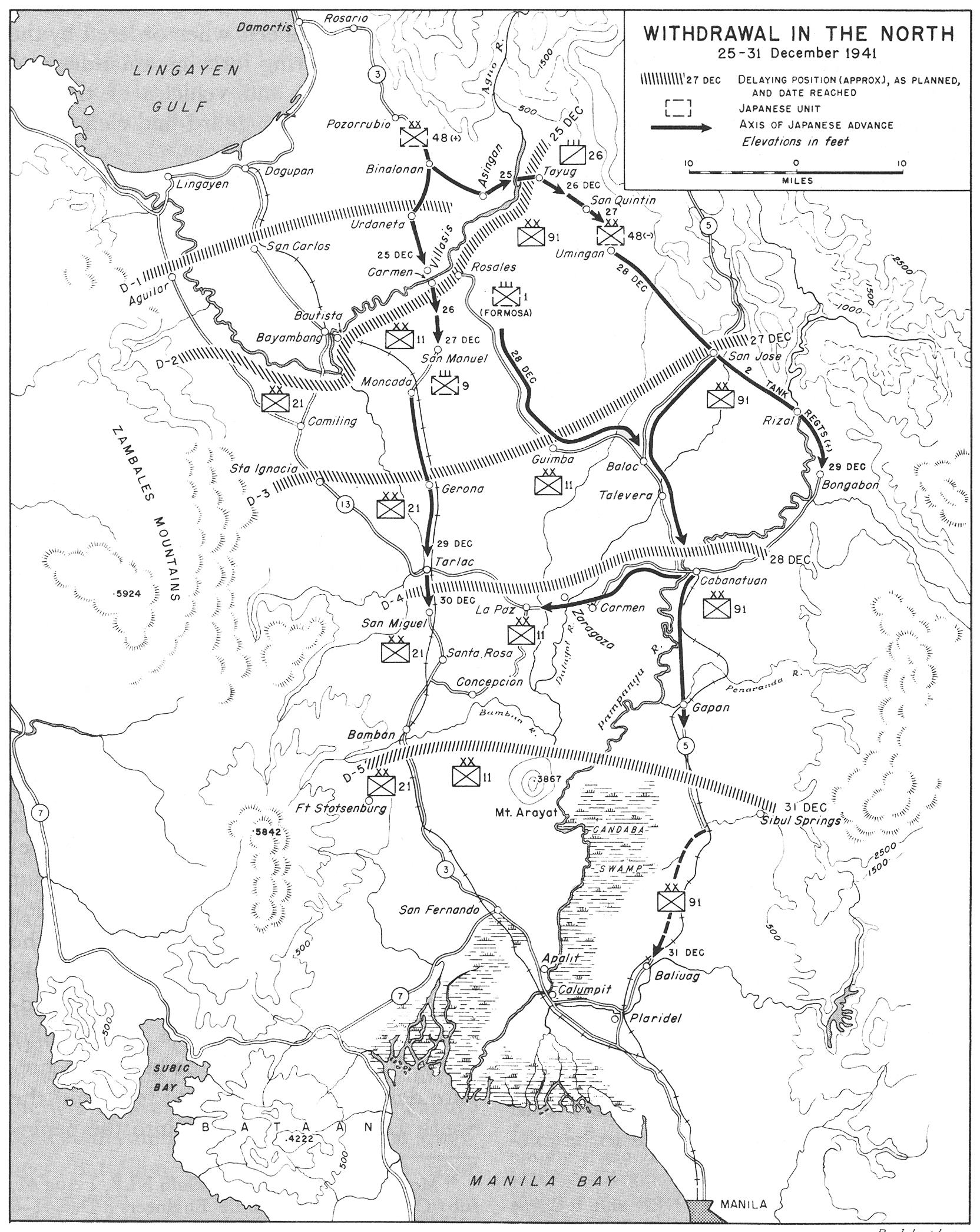
Withdrawal in the North, December 25–31, 1941

Despite considerable advance warning of the impending invasion, American forces in the Philippines were ill-prepared. Lingayen Gulf was the most logical site for a large invasion force to land, but the entire 120 mile coast was protected by only two Philippine Commonwealth Army divisions, of which only one had any artillery. The Americans anticipated that a landing would occur at the southern end of the gulf, which is where the Philippine 21st Division placed its artillery batteries. The northern sector was held by the Philippine 11th Division, supplemented by the 71st Division, a training division with only ten weeks of training, and the 26th Cavalry Regiment (Philippine Scouts), which was stationed on Route 3, twelve miles to the south of Rosario.

Aside from the poor weather conditions, resistance to the Japanese landing was minimal. One American submarine, S-38, managed to sink the Army transport Hayo Maru on the morning of 22 December, and USS Seal (SS-183) sank Hayataka Maru the following day. Coastal artillery slightly damaged the auxiliary seaplane tender Sanuki Maru. Despite the fighter cover provided by the IJAAF 24th and 50th Fighter Regiments, four Boeing B-17s managed to inflict some strafing damage. The only location where the Japanese faced ground opposition was at Bauang, where the Philippine 12 Infantry HQ Battalion opened fire with its one 50-caliber machine gun on the Kamijima Detachment as it landed.

== The Japanese advance north ==
The Kamijima Detachment immediately moved north on Route 3 upon landing and by 1700 hours had secured the town of Bauang, with its 3rd Battalion continuing on the road toward Baguio to secure the Naguilian airfield. It was opposed by the Philippine 71st Infantry under Lt Col Donald Van N. Bonnett, who had orders to stop the Japanese advance at San Fernando. Bonnett positioned on battalion with a battery of 75-mm guns on the coastal road, and sent a second battalion on a flanking maneuver along a secondary road to the east. However, the Japanese advance was too quick for the inexperienced and poor-trained Philippine troops to get into position, and Bonnett subsequently gave orders for the division to withdraw to beyond Baguio by midnight.

== The Japanese advance south ==
In the southern sector of the front, the Japanese 1st Formosa and a portion of the 48th Mountain Artillery battalions under the command of Colonel Hifumi Imai landed at Aringay by 1030 and advanced south towards Rosario along the coastal road. They were joined by 1600 by the 48th Reconnaissance and 4th Tank Regiments, which had landed at 0730 just north of Damortis. Also in the southern sector, the 47th Infantry with a battalion from the 48th Mountain Artillery under the command of Col Isamu Yanagi was also advancing towards Rosario. Their movement was opposed by a battalion of infantry of the Philippine 11th Division under Brig General William E. Brougher, but after a minor skirmish, they Philippine forces were routed. Homma at this point was still unable to land his artillery and heavy equipment due to heavy seas, and therefore decided to shift his anchorage and landing points to the south. The 48th Division was ordered to take the town of San Fabian, which had two 155-mm coastal artillery guns, and the Japanese drive along the Lingayen coastline was accordingly extended further south than originally planned.

== The Battle of Rosario ==
To oppose the Japanese advance on Manila, General Wainwright stationed the Philippine 26th Cavalry along the coastal road north of Rosario at the hamlet of Damortis. Receiving reports that the Japanese were advancing on bicycles and by light motor vehicles, Wainwright also dispatched a platoon of five tanks. When the 26th Cavalry encountered forward elements of the Japanese 48th Reconnaissance and 4th Tank Regiments, it fell back to the hamlet of Damoritis, where defensive positions had been established. However, with its command tank destroyed and the remaining four were damaged by Japanese 47-mm anti-tank guns, the outnumbered and outgunned 26th Cavalry withdrew, leaving Damortis under complete control of the Japanese by 1900.

Rosario then became the center of American resistance. Earlier in the afternoon, Wainwright had ordered Brig General Clyde A. Selleck to take the Philippine 71st Division to Damortis to hold the junction of the Rosario-Baguio road east of Rosario. However, by the time Selleck arrived at Rosario, he learned that the Japanese were advancing from both Damortis and Agoo. By evening, the survivors of the 26th Cavalry reached Rosario with the Japanese in close pursuit. At 2000, the Japanese tanks penetrated the 26th Cavalry rear guard, causing considerable casualties and it was only by blocking a bridge a few miles west of Rosario by a burning tank that the Americans managed to slow the Japanese attack and prevent a panicked rout. The center of Rosario was the scene of a pitched battle between troops of the Philippine 71st Division and a part of Colonel Yanagi's 47th Infantry. However, fortunately for the Americans, much of Yanagi's force had been ordered back for the capture of San Fabian, enabling the Philippine forces to escape.

Thus, within one day of landing, the Japanese had secured a large section of the Lingayen Gulf coastline, and advanced north, south and east. To the north, they had joined with Colonel Tanaka's forces from northern Luzon and to the south had occupied Rosario. The only opposition had come from the Philippine 26th Cavalry, whose poorly equipped troops and outnumbered were unable to slow the Japanese advance.

== The Japanese advance to the Agno River ==
On the morning of 23 December, the Philippine 71st Division set up defensive positions along Route 3 south of Sison, with the remnants of the 26th Cavalry falling back to Pozorrubio to reorganize. The advance of the Japanese 47th Infantry was slowed until noon by the Philippine artillery, by which time the Japanese 47th had been joined by the 48th Reconnaissance and 4th Tank Regiments. Aided by aircraft, the Japanese began a concerted attack, and the Philippine 71st Division broke and fled, abandoning its artillery. At 1900 hours, the Japanese entered Sison, with the American line moved back to just north of Pozorrubio, and the 26th Cavalry continuing its retreat to Binalonan. However, the Japanese continued their attack into the night, driving the Philippine 91st Division from Pozorrubuio and ending American hopes of making a stand there.

Even before the fall of Sison, Wainwright had received permission from General MacArthur to withdraw behind the Agno River as he believed that further defense of the Lingayen area was impossible. Wainwright hoped to launch a counterattack with the Philippine Division and other units being held in reserve.

In the early morning of 24 December, the Japanese 4th Tank Regiment encountered the Philippine 26th Cavalry northwest of Binalonan. Although lacking anti-tank guns, the 26th Cavalry made a strong stand, inflicting considerable casualties on the Japanese, but with the arrival of the Japanese 2nd Formosa later that morning, the 26th Cavalry found itself outnumbered and almost encircled. For more than four hours, the 26th Cavalry held its ground, until the remaining 450 men began to withdraw at 1530 hours. By dusk, the survivors reached Tayug on the far side of the Agno River, and the Japanese entered Binalonan. At this point, the Japanese were in position to enter the central plain of Luzon for the final drive to Manila.

== Consequences ==
Despite adverse weather, General Homma was able to land the bulk of his forces at Lingayen Gulf with little opposition, and in a matter of a few days had secured the northern approaches to the Philippine capital of Manila.
