= Japanese minesweeper No. 10 (1938) =

History

Japan
- Name: W-10
- Builder: Tokyo Ishikawajima Shipbuilding Yard, Tokyo
- Laid down: 21 December 1937
- Launched: 22 September 1938
- Completed: 15 February 1939
- Out of service: 15 March 1942
- Fate: Sunk by air raid off Pandan, Caoayan (near Vigan) on 10 December 1941 at 17°32'N, 120°22'E.

General characteristics
- Class & type: W-7 Class
- Type: Minesweeper
- Displacement: 630
- Length: 237 feet
- Height: 25.9 feet
- Depth: 6.6 feet
- Installed power: 3,850 horsepower
- Propulsion: Steam
- Speed: 20 knots
- Complement: 88
- Armament: 2 x 120mm (4.7") 45 cal, 9 x 25mm AA, 36 depth charges

The No.10 minesweeper (第十号掃海艇, Dai Jū Gō Sōkaitei), also sometimes called W-10 was a No.7 class minesweeper of the Imperial Japanese Navy. It was launched on 21 December 1937 and completed in 1939.

== Service record ==
The Japanese minesweeper W-10, sometimes also referred to as No. 10, was a minesweeper of the Imperial Japanese Navy. It was laid down on 21 December 1937 at Ishikawajima Shipbuilding, (now known as the IHI Corporation) and launched on 22 September 1938. When it was completed on 15 January 1939 it was attached to the Sasebo Naval District. On 1 June 1941 W-10 was assigned to the Third Fleet, as part of MineSweepDiv 21, along with the minesweepers W-7, W-8, W-9, W-11, and W-12.

On 27 November of the same year, W-10 departed from Sasebo, and arrived at the Mako Guard District in Formosa, a major base for the Imperial Japanese Navy. On 7 December 1941, the Japanese invasion of the Philippines began, starting with the invasion of Batan Island, a fairly small island off the north coast of Luzon. On 10 December, an invasion force was sent to the islands of Vigan and Aparri. Despite poor weather, the forces still managed to land some troops on the islands. While participating in the invasion of Vigan, W-10 was attacked by Captain Samuel H. Marrett of the 34th Pursuit Squadron. Marrett, in a P-35, undertook multiple strafing runs against W-10 until the ship exploded. The explosion was so powerful that it tore the wing off of Marrett's P-35, causing him to crash into the sea. Marrett also damaged the Oigawa Maru and Takao Maru.
