= Matsukaze (disambiguation) =

Matsukaze is a Japanese classical Noh drama.

Matsukaze may also refer to:

- Matsukaze, the legendary horse of Maeda Toshimasu
- Matsukaze, a Danzan-ryū jujitsu technique
- Japanese destroyer Matsukaze, two Japanese destroyers
- Masaya Matsukaze, Japanese actor and voice actor
- Matsukaze Tenma, a fictional character in the video game Inazuma Eleven GO
- Super Matsukaze, a Japanese rail service
