= Japanese transport ship Hayo Maru =

Transport ship used by the Japanese Army during World War II

History

Empire of Japan
- Name: Hayo Maru
- Builder: Asano Shipbuilding Co. Ltd., Tsurumi
- Sponsored by: Toyo Kisen Co., Ltd.
- Home port: Yokohama
- Identification: 27962
- Notes: Call sign: SGQF

History

Imperial Japanese Army
- Acquired: requisitioned by Imperial Japanese Army,
- Notes: Call sign: JFAD

General characteristics
- Class & type: Type B standard cargo ship
- Tonnage: 5,445 GRT • 3,310 NRT
- Length: 121.9 m (399 ft 11 in) o/a
- Beam: 16.1 m (52 ft 10 in)
- Draught: 9.7 m (31 ft 10 in)
- Installed power: Single triple-expansion reciprocating steam engine, 258 NHP / 3,191 IHP
- Speed: 9.5 knots cruising speed / 13.7 knots top speed

Hayo Maru (Japanese: 巴洋丸) was a steel-hulled transport ship requisitioned by the Imperial Japanese Army during World War II.

== History ==
She was one of the 25 Type B standard cargo ships (B型標準貨物船, B-gata hyōjun kamotsusen) all but one built by Asano Shipyard (one was built at the Uraga Dock Company) between 1918 and 1919.

On 18 December 1941, she departed Takao as part of "Operation M", the Invasion of the Philippines as part of the third echelon tasked with landing at Lingayen Gulf.
