= Japanese transport ship Nichiai Maru =

History

Empire of Japan
- Name: Yayoi Maru (彌生丸)
- Owner: Suzuki Shoten
- Builder: Asano Shipbuilding Company, Tsurumi
- Yard number: 338
- Laid down: 15 September 1917
- Launched: 1 March 1919
- Completed: 1 April 1919
- Renamed: Nichiai Maru (日愛丸), 10 June 1938
- Identification: 25010
- Notes: Call sign: JYID

Imperial Japanese Army
- Name: Nichiai Maru
- Acquired: requisitioned by Imperial Japanese Army, 19 November 1941
- Fate: Sunk by air attack, 3 February 1944

General characteristics
- Class & type: Type B standard cargo ship
- Tonnage: 5,439 GRT, 3,415 NRT; 8,789 DWT
- Length: 121.92 m (400.0 ft)
- Beam: 16.15 m (53 ft 0 in)
- Draught: 0.75 m (2 ft 6 in)
- Propulsion: 258 nhp / 2,800 ihp
- Speed: 9-10 knots

Nichiai Maru (Japanese:日愛丸) was a transport of the Imperial Japanese Army during World War II. She was sunk by U.S. Air Force aircraft on 3 February 1944 off New Hanover Island, Papua New Guinea.

== History ==
She was laid down on 15 September 1917 at the Tsurumi shipyard of Asano Shipbuilding Company for the benefit of the Suzuki Shoten (jp:鈴木商店), one of Japan's largest pre-war trading companies, and given identification number 25010 She was the second ship of the Yoshida Maru No 1-class of 25 standard cargo ships (referred to as Type B at the time) built by Asano Shipyard (one was built at the Uraga Dock Company) between 1918 and 1919. She was launched on 1 March 1919, completed on 1 April 1919, and given the name Yayoi Maru (彌生丸).

In 1919, she was sold to Kokusai Kisen Co., Ltd. (jp:国際汽船) of Yokohama. In April 1929, she was purchased by Karafuto Kisen K.K. of Tokyo. On 22 November 1937, she was transferred to Nissan Kisen Co Limited of Tokyo which had purchased her former owner and her name was changed to Nichiai Maru on 10 June 1938.

On 19 November 1941, she was requisitioned by the Imperial Japanese Army and immediately sent to Davao arriving on 26 December 1941 where a convoy was assembling nearby to attack the Dutch East Indies. On 6 January 1942, she was assigned to the Tarakan Occupation Force under Rear Admiral Hirose Sueto which departed for Tarakan the same day.

== Fate ==
On 3 February 1944, she was attacked by North American B-25 Mitchell medium bombers and Consolidated PBY Catalinas of the United States Army Fifth Air Force and sunk at (03°17′S 149°34′E) southwest of New Hanover.
