= SS Yoshida Maru No. 1 =

Japanese cargo ship

History

Japan
- Name: Yoshida Maru No. 1
- Operator: Yamashita Kisen K. K.
- Builder: Asano Shipbuilding Company, Tsurumi-ku, Yokohama
- Completed: January 1919
- In service: 1919–1944
- Fate: Torpedoed and sunk, 26 April 1944

General characteristics
- Class & type: Type B standard cargo ship
- Tonnage: 5,425 GRT
- Length: 121.9 m (399 ft 11 in)
- Beam: 16.2 m (53 ft 2 in)
- Height: 9.8 m (32 ft 2 in)
- Propulsion: 1 triple expansion engine, single shaft, 1 screw
- Speed: 10 knots (19 km/h)
- Notes: Steel construction

SS Yoshida Maru No. 1 (第一吉田丸) was a Japanese cargo ship owned by Yamashita Kisen K. K. The ship was built in 1919 by Asano Shipbuilding Company, at Tsurumi-ku, Yokohama, and sank on 26 April 1944 with great loss of life.

== History ==
Yoshida Maru No. 1 was built at Tsurumi-ku, Yokohama in 1919. She was the first ship of her class

=== World War II ===
Yoshida Maru No. 1 was requisitioned as a transport ship by the Imperial Japanese Navy.

In April 1944, she departed Shanghai as part of the Take Ichi convoy carrying a full Japanese regiment of the 32nd Infantry Division. On April 26, 1944 she was spotted and sunk by the submarine USS Jack. There were no survivors from the 2,586 soldiers, 81 ship's crew, and 2 armed guards aboard at the time of sinking.

== Ships In class ==
25 Type B standard cargo ships (B型標準貨物船, B-gata hyōjun kamotsusen) were built by Asano Shipyard (one was built at the Uraga Dock Company) between 1918 and 1919.

#	Ship	Launched	Commissioned	Operators	Fate	Notes
1	Yoshida Maru No. 1	January 1919	1919	Yamashita Kisen K. K.; Imperial Japanese Navy	Torpedoed and sunk, 26 April 1944	
2	Nichiai Maru	1 March 1919	1 April 1919	Suzuki Shoten; Imperial Japanese Army	Sunk by air attack, 3 February 1944	Names: Yayoi Maru (1919–1938); Nichiai Maru (1938–1944)
3	Nichiryu Maru	1919	May 1919	Karafuto Kisen Kabushiki Kaisha; Nissan Kissen Kabushiki Kaisha; Imperial Japanese Army	Sunk by Australian aircraft on 6 January 1943	Names: Rozan Maru (1919–1931); Karafuto Maru (1931–1937); Nichiryu Maru (1937–1943)
4	Buyo Maru	5 February 1919	19 March 1919	Kokusai Kisan Kaisha (1919-1932); Tamai Shosen K.K. (1932-1941); Imperial Japanese Army (1941-1943)	Torpedoed and sunk, 26 January 1943	
5	Kureha Maru					
6	Choyo Maru					
7	Malta Maru					
8	Kashu Maru					
9	Boston Maru					
10	Koshun Maru					
11	Uralsan Maru					
12	Eri Maru					
13	Clyde Maru					
14	Havre Maru					
15	Milan Maru					
16	Biyo Maru					
17	Meiyo Maru					
19	Tokuyo Maru					
20	Hoshu Maru					
21	Reiyo Maru					
22	Woyo Maru					
23	Hayo Maru			Imperial Japanese Army		
24	Juyo Maru					
25	Koyo Maru					

== See also ==
- List by death toll of ships sunk by submarines
