= SS Nichiryu Maru =

History
- Name: Rozan Maru (1919–1931); Karafuto Maru (1931–1937); Nichiryu Maru (1937–1943)
- Owner: Karafuto Kisen Kabushiki Kaisha; Nissan Kissen Kabushiki Kaisha; Imperial Japanese Army (?–1943)
- Builder: Asano Ship Building Company, Tsurumi
- Launched: 1919
- Completed: May 1919
- Fate: Sunk by Australian aircraft on 6 January 1943

General characteristics
- Class & type: Type B standard cargo ship
- Tonnage: 5,870 GRT
- Length: 400 feet (122 m)
- Beam: 53 feet (16 m)
- Draught: 29.4 feet (9.0 m)
- Propulsion: Triple expansion engines (513 NHP)

Nichiryu Maru (Nitiryu Maru) was a 5,447 gross register ton cargo ship built by Asano Ship Building Company, Tsurumi in 1919 as Rozan Maru. She was the third ship of the Yoshida Maru No 1-class of 25 standard cargo ships (referred to as Type B at the time) built by Asano Shipyard (one was built at the Uraga Dock Company) between 1918 and 1919. In April 1929, she was acquired by Karafuto Kisen Kabushiki Kaisha and in 1931, renamed Karafuto Maru. On 22 November 1937, she was acquired by Nissan Kissen Kabushiki Kaisha and renamed Nichiryu Maru. She was requisitioned by the Imperial Japanese Army during World War II.

== Fate ==
On 6 January 1943, while steaming as part of a convoy, carrying two companies of the 3rd Battalion, 102nd Infantry Regiment and medical supplies for the garrison at Lae, was hit by bombs from a Royal Australian Air Force PBY Catalina aircraft, and was sunk at 06°30'S, 149°00'E. Destroyers rescued 739 of the 1,100 troops on board, but the ship took with it 361 soldiers and all of Okabe's medical supplies.
