= Okajima =

Okajima (written: 岡島, 岡嶋) is a Japanese surname. Notable people with the surname include:

- Hideki Okajima (born 1975), former Japanese professional baseball pitcher
- Kanata Okajima (born 1984), Japanese singer and songwriter
- Kiyonobu Okajima (born 1971), former Japanese football player
- Koji Okajima (born 1957), figure skating coach
- Tae Okajima, Japanese voice actress
- Takero Okajima (born 1989), Japanese professional baseball catcher
- Toru Okajima (岡島 徹; born 1943), Japanese ice hockey player
- Okajima Satoshi, Japanese Army officer

== Fictional characters ==
- Taiga Okajima (岡島 大河), a character in the Assassination Classroom anime and manga
- Takeo Okajima, a character in the Studio Ghibli film Only Yesterday
