= Okajima Satoshi =

Japanese military personnel

- 岡島 哲

Personal details
- Born: July 24, 1920 Kagoshima Prefecture, Japan
- Died: August 20, 1945 (aged 25) Mito, Ibaraki Prefecture, Japan
- Cause of death: Suicide

Military service
- Branch/service: Imperial Japanese Army
- Years of service: 1940–1945
- Rank: Major (少佐, shōsa)
- Battles/wars: World War II; Pacific War

Okajima Satoshi (Japanese: 岡島 哲; 1920–1945) was a Japanese Army officer.

He is known for leading a dissident faction of Japanese troops in the chaotic period after Emperor Hirohito's surrender broadcast in August 1945. His final actions ended in suicide following the abortive attempt to resist Japan's surrender.

== Early life and military career ==
Okajima was born on July 24, 1920 in Kagoshima Prefecture. He was the second son of a schoolteacher, Okajima Kiyoshi (岡島 清). His family later moved to Niigata Prefecture. Okajima entered the Imperial Japanese Army Academy and graduated in 1940.

During the Second World War, Okajima served as commander of an infantry regiment and saw combat at the Battle of Guadalcanal. His conduct there earned him a reputation for tenacity, and troops reportedly nicknamed him the "demon captain" (鬼隊長, oni-taichō).

Later in the war he was assigned as an instructor at the Army Aviation Signal School in Mito, part of the Army's training command.

== Mito incident ==
When Hirohito's order to surrender was received on August 15, 1945 by the Army personnel stationed in Mito, a conflict arose between a faction led by Maj. Tanaka Tsunekichi (田中 常吉) eager to surrender to the Americans and a smaller faction led by Okajima committed to defending Japan's sovereignty to the death. Within 48 hours, Tanaka was shot by Lt. Hayashi Yoshinori (林 慶紀) and Okajima decided to take action. Okajima commandeered a southbound train coincidentally passing through Mito and travelled to Tōkyō with around 400 men under his command. In Tōkyō, Okajima was stunned when the Army high command threatened to use force if he and his unit refused to comply with the order to surrender. Okajima agreed to return to Mito by train on August 20. Later that day after returning to Mito, Okajima shot himself.

== See also ==
- Yokota Mototsuna, loyalist who died by suicide in 1864 during the Mito Rebellion at 17 years old
