= Shōhatsu-class landing craft =

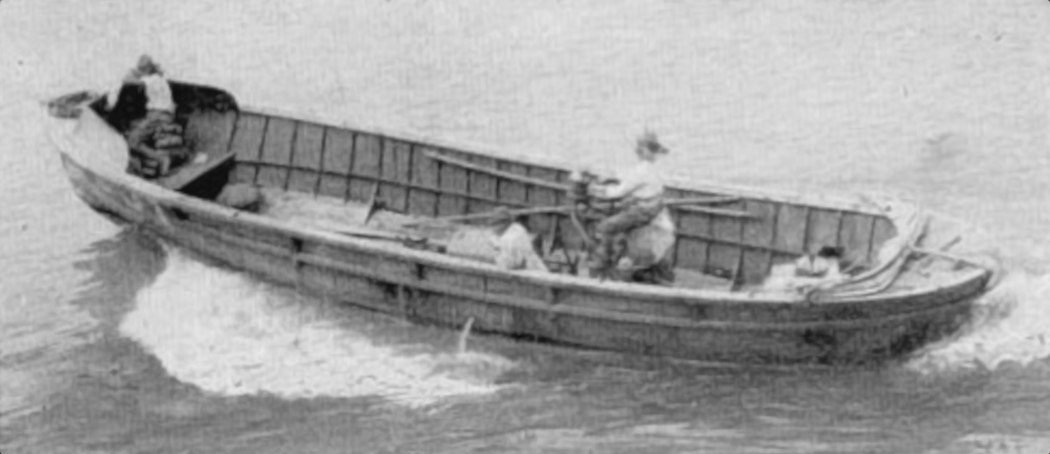
- Shōhatsu landing craft with three people in 1943

Class overview
- Name: Shōhatsu Class, Landing Craft
- Operators: during World War II: Imperial Japanese Army

General characteristics (Shōhatsu-class landing craft)
- Type: Landing Craft/Barge
- Tonnage: 4.4 tons
- Length: 34.9 ft (10.64 m)o/a
- Beam: 8 ft (2.44 m)
- Draught: 1.11 ft (0.34 m)
- Speed: 7.5 knots (13.9 km/h)
- Range: 60 nautical miles (111 km) at 7.5 knots (13.9 km/h)
- Capacity: 35 men or 3.5 tons cargo
- Complement: 5
- Armament: 1 machine gun

The Shōhatsu motorboat (小発動艇, Shōhatsu-dōtei; Small motorboat) or "ten meters special cargo ship" (十米特型運貨船, Jūbei Toku-gata Unkashisen) was a small landing craft used by the Imperial Japanese Army during World War II. It was used for landing personnel and stores. It was designated the "Type B" landing craft by the United States.

== Design ==
The Shōhatsu class were 34.9 ft (10.64 m) long, 8 ft (2.44 m) wide, and had a draft of 1.11 ft (0.34 m). The class had a maximum speed of 7.5 knots (13.9 km/h), and a range of 60 nautical miles (111 km), assuming they were travelling at top speed. The ship could hold 35 men, or 3.5 tons of cargo. It was built of steel, and had a single bow with no landing ramp.

== Service history ==
It was carried by destroyers and smaller vessels as a cargo boat. Japan ordered 20 of the Shōhatsu class land crafts, but it is not known how many of them were actually finished and delivered.
