= Type 91 10 cm howitzer =

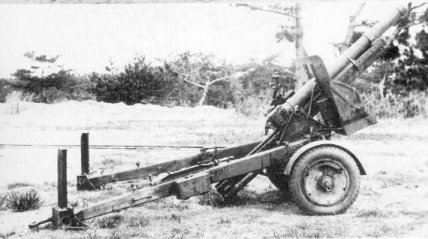
- Type: light howitzer
- Place of origin: Empire of Japan

Service history
- In service: 1931–1949?
- Used by: Imperial Japanese Army; National Revolutionary Army; People's Liberation Army
- Wars: Second Sino-Japanese War; Soviet-Japanese Border Wars; World War II; Chinese Civil War

Production history
- Designer: Schneider et Cie
- Designed: 1927-1931
- Manufacturer: Osaka Arsenal
- Unit cost: 26,000 yen ($6,986 USD) in August 1939
- Produced: 1931-1944
- No. built: 1,249 produced in Japan with additional 77 imported from Schneider
- Variants: Steel tires on artillery wheels, Wheels and Tires

Specifications
- Mass: 1,500 kg (3,300 lb) Firing; 1,979 kg (4,363 lb) Traveling
- Length: 4.72 m (15 ft 6 in) Firing; 8.94 m (29 ft 4 in) Traveling
- Barrel length: 2.54 metres (8 ft 4 in) L/24
- Width: 1.57 m (5 ft 2 in) Track; 1.84 m (6 ft) Maximum
- Height: 1.73 m (5 ft 8 in)
- Shell: 105 x 243mm R
- Shell weight: 15.7 kg (34 lb 10 oz)
- Caliber: 105 mm (4.1 in)
- Breech: Interrupted screw
- Recoil: Hydro-pneumatic
- Carriage: Split trail, demountable recoil spade plates, trail blocks integral to trails. Wheels and Tires or Steel tires on artillery wheels.
- Elevation: -5° to +45°
- Traverse: 20° right,20° left
- Rate of fire: 15 Minutes 2 rpm Maximum 6-8 rpm Continuous 50-60 rph
- Muzzle velocity: 546 m/s (1,791 ft/s)
- Maximum firing range: 10,771 m (11,779 yd)
- Feed system: Manual
- Sights: Panoramic

The Type 91 10 cm howitzer (九一式十糎榴弾砲, Kyūisshiki Jyūsenchi Ryūdanhō) was a 105 mm (4.13 in) howitzer used by the Imperial Japanese Army during the Second Sino-Japanese War and World War II as the standard Japanese light howitzer. The Type 91 10 cm howitzer was designed by the French company Schneider during the late 1920s per Japanese Army requirements and was considered to be light, robust and reliable. Type 91 howitzers were issued to artillery regiments where they would supplement 75mm field guns. The Type 91 number was designated in 1931.

== History and development ==
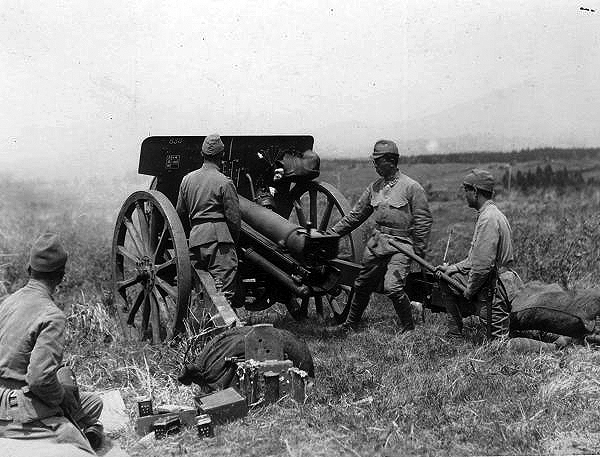
Cadets of the Imperial Japanese Army during shooting training with Type 91 10-cm-howitzer (with wooden spoked wheels) at Fuji training ground. ca. 1935

The Type 91 10 cm howitzer was an orthodox design howitzer which was designed by the French company Schneider during the late 1920s for the Japanese Army Technical Bureau. The Japanese Army put heavy emphasis on capability and lightweight, insisting that Schneider reduce at least 200kg from the base model before formal adoption. It was intended to supplement, and eventually supersede the largely obsolete Type 38 15 cm howitzer, which had been in service since the end of the Russo-Japanese War. Over one thousand units were produced beginning in 1931.

== Design ==
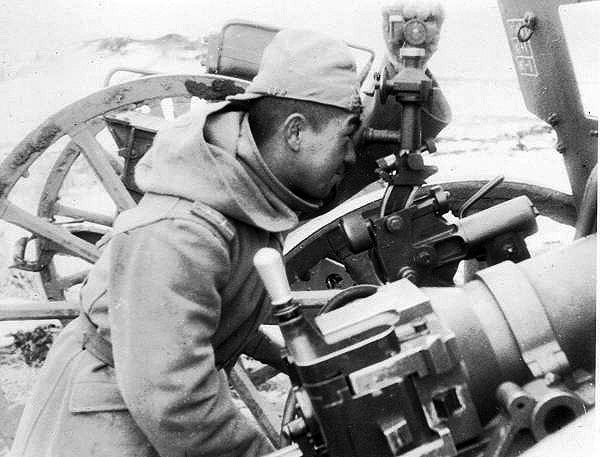
A Japanese cannoneer is taking aim

For a weapon of modern design the Model 91 (1931) 105 mm howitzer is by U. S. standards an extremely crude-looking piece. It is much smaller and lighter than the German and U. S. howitzers of the same caliber, weighing even less than the standard 75 mm (3.0 in) guns used in Europe in World War I. Despite its lightness and its appearance of not having been quite finished, it is capable of throwing a 35 lb (16 kg) shell very nearly as far as can the heavier and far more formidable looking German 105 mm howitzer.

The Type 91 10 cm howitzer was a standard 105 mm artillery piece of extremely light construction relative to range and weight of projector. It can be identified by its demountable spade plates, long cradle extending almost to muzzle end of tube, a hydro-pneumatic recoil mechanism, Split trail, and interrupted screw breech mechanism. It was designed to be towed by a team of six horses.

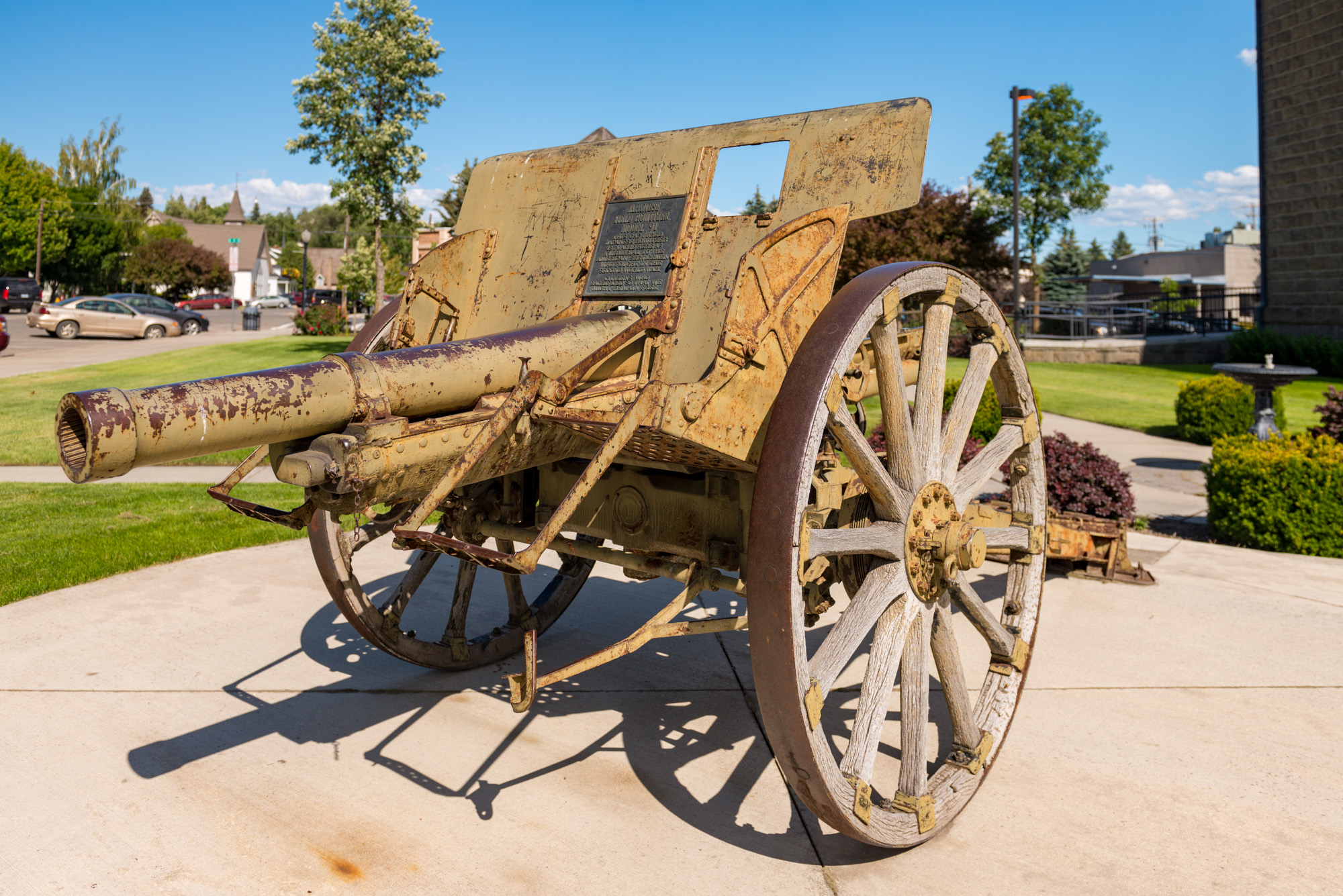
Captured Model 91 howitzer outside Wallowa County Courthouse, Enterprise, Oregon

The Type 91 fired a 15 kg standard high-explosive shell, up to 10,500 m (11,500 yd) and could also fire chemical, armor-piercing, and shrapnel shells. Japanese charge-system numbering is unusual:

- Charge 1: 11,772 yd (10,764 m)
- Charge 2: 8,502 yd (7,774 m)
- Charge 3: 6,322 yd (5,781 m)
- Charge 4: 5,123 yd (4,684 m)

To improve the potential anti-tank capability of the Type 91 howitzer, a HEAT round was developed which did not begin production until January 1945. About 15,000 HEAT rounds were produced before the formal end of the war. Armor penetration was rated at 120 mm.

== Variants ==
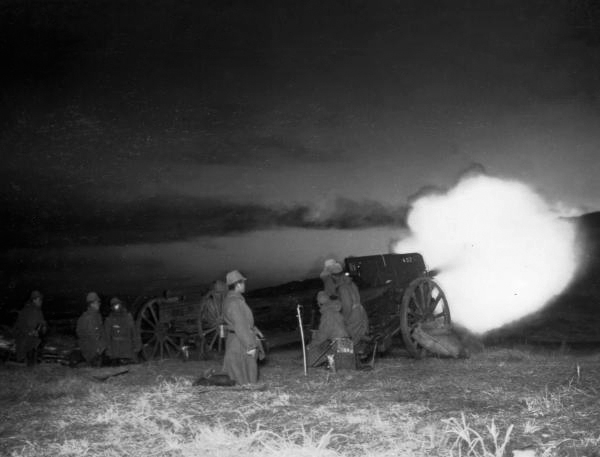
Night practice shooting at Fuji training ground

Early models of the Type 91 had wooden spoked wheels, but later versions had steel wheels with pneumatic tires for towing behind a motorized transport at the cost of an extra 250 kilograms (550 lb).

== Combat record ==
Type 91 10 cm howitzer was used in large numbers in front line combat service from the time of the invasion of Manchuria through the Soviet-Japanese Border Wars, the Second Sino-Japanese War and in most fronts during the Pacific War. The Type 91 was typically assigned to field artillery regiments together with 75 mm field guns.

Weapons captured by the Chinese during the Second Sino-Japanese War, or abandoned in China at the time of the surrender of Japan, were placed into service by both the Nationalist government and the Communist forces during the Chinese Civil War.
