= Japanese submarine chaser CH-14 =

Japanese World War II naval vessel

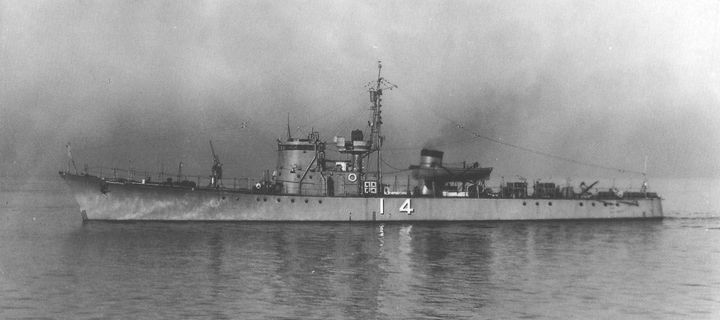
- CH-14 in 1941

History

Empire of Japan
- Name: CH-14
- Builder: Tama Shipbuilding, Okajima
- Laid down: 6 June 1940
- Launched: 29 November 1940
- Completed: 31 March 1941
- Commissioned: 31 March 1941
- Decommissioned: 30 November 1945
- Fate: Scrapped 1945

General characteristics
- Class & type: No.13-class submarine chaser
- Displacement: 438 long tons (445 t) standard
- Length: 51 m (167 ft 4 in) o/a
- Beam: 6.7 m (22 ft 0 in)
- Draught: 2.75 m (9 ft 0 in)
- Propulsion: 2 × Kampon Mk.23A Model 8 diesels, 2 shafts, 1,700 bhp (1,268 kW)
- Speed: 16 knots (30 km/h; 18 mph)
- Range: 2,000 nmi (3,700 km) at 14 kn (26 km/h; 16 mph)
- Complement: 68
- Sensors & processing systems: 1 × Type 93 active sonar; 1 × Type 93 hydrophone
- Armament: 1 × 76.2 mm (3 in) L/40 AA gun; 2 × Type 93 13.2 mm (0.52 in) AA guns; 36 × Type 95 depth charges; 2 × Type 94 depth charge projectors; 1 × depth charge thrower

CH-14 was a No.13-class submarine chaser of the Imperial Japanese Navy during World War II.

== History ==
CH-14 was laid down by Tama Shipbuilding at its Okajima shipyard on 6 June 1940, launched on 29 November 1940, and completed and commissioned on 31 March 1941.

On 28 July 1945, she was attacked by aircraft from Vice Admiral John S. McCain Sr.'s Task Force 38 which resulted in her being beached near Yokosuka (at 34°5′N 136°15′E) where she remained until the end of World War II. CH-14 was struck from the Navy List on 30 November 1945 and scrapped soon after.

== Additional references ==
- "Escort Vessels of the Imperial Japanese Navy special issue". Ships of the World (in Japanese). Vol. 45. Kaijinsha. February 1996.
- Model Art Extra No.340, Drawings of Imperial Japanese Naval Vessels Part-1 (in Japanese). Model Art Co. Ltd. October 1989.
- The Maru Special, Japanese Naval Vessels No.49, Japanese submarine chasers and patrol boats (in Japanese). Ushio Shobō. March 1981.
