= Japanese invasion of Aparri =

Part of the Philippines campaign of WW2

- Part of Philippines campaign (1941–1942), Pacific War
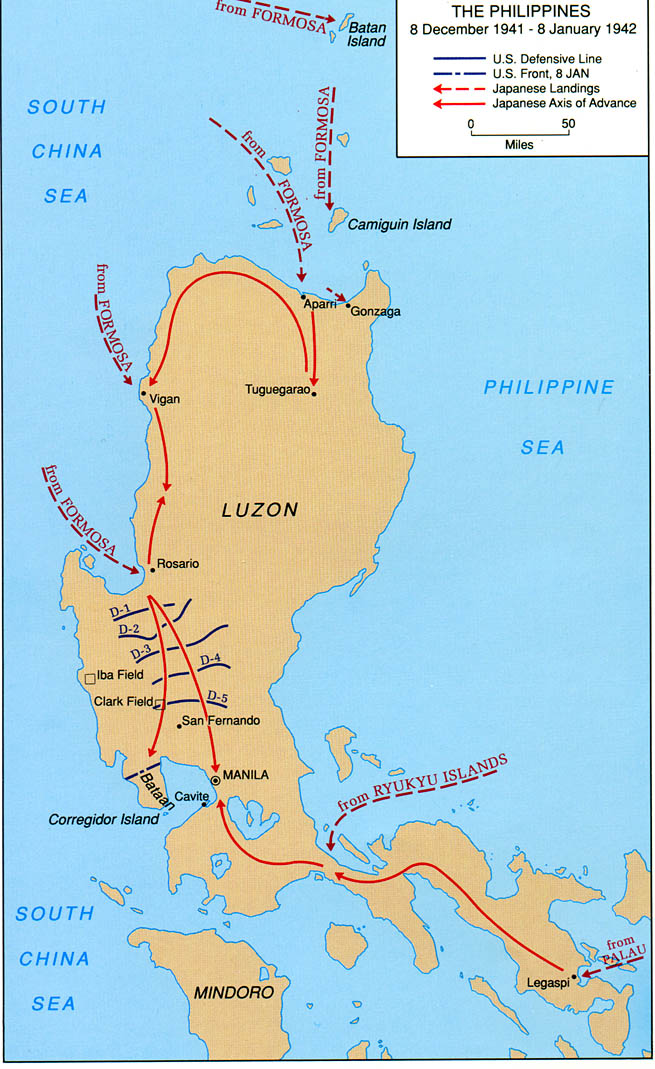
Date	10 December 1941
Location	Aparri, Philippines
Result	Japanese victory

Belligerents
Japan	United States: Commonwealth of the Philippines

The Japanese Invasion of Aparri (Filipino: Paglusob ng mga Hapones sa Aparri, Ilocano: Panagraut dagiti Hapon iti Aparri) on 10 December, 1941, was one in a series of advance landings made by Imperial Japanese forces as a first step in their invasion of the Philippines. The purpose was to obtain control of local air strips, which could be used as forward bases by fighter aircraft for operations further south. The first invasion was at Batan Island on 8 December 1941. This was followed by Vigan, Legaspi, Davao, and Jolo Island over the next few days

== Disposition of forces ==
Prior to World War II, Aparri was considered a substantial port city, with a population of 26,500. However, although located at the mouth of the Cagayan River, it is isolated from the rest of Luzon by mountain ranges to the east, west, and south. Manila and the central plains of Luzon were connected to Aparri by Route 5 through the narrow Balete Pass to the south, or by a long coastal route. The Cagayan Valley was not regarded by the Americans as a route of invasion.

The area of Aparri was in theory defended by General Wainwright's North Luzon Force. However, with only a few men and a large territory to cover, Wainwright could spare only one partially trained and equipped Philippine Army division, the 11th Division, commanded by Colonel William E. Brougher, for all of northern Luzon. A reserve division, the 11th had begun to mobilize only in September and was at only two-thirds of its authorized strength of 1500 men per regiment. It also suffered from a serious shortage of equipment, including almost all of its artillery and transports. This division maintained only one battalion in the entire Cagayan Valley, with only one company actually at Aparri. On the Japanese side, General Homma had organized a detachment from the IJA 48th Division’s 2nd Infantry Regiment under Colonel Toru Tanaka. This numbered approximately 2000 men of the 2nd Battalion, half the 1st Battalion and the regimental headquarters. The invasion force was supported by a flotilla of the Imperial Japanese Navy led by Vice Admiral Kenzaburo Hara, consisting of the light cruiser Natori; six destroyers (Fumizuki, Nagatsuki, Satsuki, Minazuki, Harukaze, Hatakaze}; three minesweepers (W-15, W-16, W-17); six anti-submarine craft from the 1st Subchaser Division (CH-1, CH-2, CH-3) and the 2nd Subchaser division (CH-14, CH-15, CH-16); six Imperial Japanese Army transports (Akiura Maru, Arizona Maru, Kazauura Maru, Kurama Maru, Matsukawa Maru, Yuzan Maru); the auxiliary aircraft transport Keiyō Maru, and five sea trucks. The fleet deployed from Mako in the Pescadores and arrived at Aparri before dawn on 10 December. The landing operation was covered by aircraft of the IJAAF 24th and 50th Fighter Regiments launched from the airfield at Batan island captured the day before.

== Landing and aftermath ==
The landing operation at Aparri faced no opposition from American forces; however, after two companies had landed rough seas and winds forced a shift in location to Gonzaga, some 20 miles to the east. Reports of the landing soon reached General MacArthur’s headquarters in Manila, where it was correctly assumed that the objective was to seize airfields from which fighters could deploy for operations further south. However, General Wainwright considered the landing at Aparri to be a feint to divide his already weak defenses, and decided not to offer resistance aside from destroying bridges on the route from Balete Pass.

As the Japanese were unloading at Gonzaga, two B-17 Flying Fortress bombers from Clark Field attacked the transports. One of the aircraft was piloted by Captain Colin Kelly, who reported that he had attacked and severely damaged a Japanese battleship before he was shot down. Kelly was posthumously awarded the Distinguished Flying Cross and was extensively portrayed in Allied propaganda as the first war hero for flying his damaged aircraft into the smokestack of the battleship Haruna as the first kamikaze; however, there were no Japanese battleships in the area, and the only losses suffered by the Japanese in this attack was slight damage to the light cruiser Natori, and the loss of minesweeper W-19, which was holed and beached.

The Tanaka Detachment reported capture of Aparri airfield by 1300, and the airfield at Camalaniugan by evening. Construction troops began work immediately on expanding the runways and establishing depot facilities. The IJAAF 50th Sentai with 36 Nakajima Ki-27 fighters was operational at Aparri from the following day.

By 12 December, the Tanaka Detachment has also secured Tuguegarao airfield, fifty miles to the south. With the Americans on the run, Homma decided to leave only a small garrison at Aparri, and to move the bulk of his combat forces to south to assist the invasion force at Lingayen Gulf.

== Consequences ==
In retrospect, the advance landings by the Japanese in northern Luzon, including at Aparri, accomplished little of strategic or tactical value. The air fields seized were small, and with the rapid advance of the Japanese into central Luzon, were soon unnecessary for further operations.
