= SS Takao Maru (1927) =

Japanese banana ship and troopship

History

Japan
- Name: Takao Maru
- Owner: Osaka Shosen Kaisha
- Operator: 1941: Imperial Japanese Army
- Port of registry: Osaka
- Builder: Uraga Dock Company, Uraga
- Yard number: 317
- Laid down: 19 July 1926
- Launched: 2 April 1927
- Completed: May 1927
- Out of service: 10 December 1941
- Identification: 1927: code letters TKCQ; by 1934: call sign JPOB
- Fate: damaged by air raid and beached

General characteristics
- Type: banana ship
- Tonnage: 4,282 GRT, 2,517 NRT
- Length: 355.6 ft (108.4 m)
- Beam: 48.5 ft (14.8 m)
- Draft: 28 ft 3 3/4 in (8.6 m)
- Depth: 32.5 ft (9.9 m)
- Decks: 2
- Installed power: 782 NHP; 3,915 shp
- Propulsion: 2 × steam turbines; double-reduction gearing; 1 × screw
- Speed: 16.3 knots (30 km/h)
- Capacity: passengers: 6 × 1st class; 64 × 3rd class
- Troops: 2,000

{{nihongo|Takao Maru|高雄丸|} } was an OSK Line cargo and passenger steamship that was built in Japan in 1927. In 1941 the Imperial Japanese Army requisitioned her. US aircraft damaged her during the first week of the Japanese invasion of the Philippines. In 1942 she was declared a total loss.

== Building and registration ==
The Uraga Dock Company in Uraga, Kanagawa built Takao Maru as yard number 317. She was laid down on 19 July 1926, launched on 2 April 1927, and completed that May.

Takao Maru's registered length was 355.6 ft (108.4 m), her beam was 48.5 ft (14.8 m), her depth was 32.5 ft (9.9 m) and her draft was 28 ft 3 3/4 in (8.6 m). Her tonnages were 4,282 GRT and 2,517 NRT. She had berths for 70 passengers: six in first class, and 64 in third class.

Takao Maru had a single screw, driven by two Mitsubishi steam turbines via double-reduction gearing. Their combined power output was rated at 782 NHP or 3,915 shp, and gave her a speed of 16.3 knots (30 km/h). She was designed as a high-speed banana ship, and had an advanced mechanical ventilation system to cool her cargo holds.

The Yokohama Dock Company built a sister ship, Koshun Maru, which was also completed in May 1927.

OSK registered Takao Maru in Osaka. Her code letters were TKCQ. By 1934 her call sign was JPOB, and this had superseded her code letters.

== 1931 collision ==
On 1 February 1931 the 9,425 GRT refrigerated cargo ship Arabia Maru, also owned by OSK, collided with Takao Maru off Kannonzaki Lighthouse in Tokyo Bay. Arabia Maru took on water in her engine room, and was beached to prevent her from sinking.

== War service and loss ==
At 16:30 hrs 7 October 1941 the Japanese Army requisitioned Takao Maru. She was converted into a troopship and given the Army number 638. On 7 December, the eve of the Japanese invasion of the Philippines, she left Mako in the Pescadores islands (now Magong in Penghu) as one of six troopships with the Third Fleet. She carried 2,000 troops of the 48th Division to take part in an amphibious assault on the island of Luzon.

At 02:00 hrs on 10 December the ships land their troops at Pandan, near Vigan. The US Far East Air Force bombed and strafed the ships with Boeing B-17 bombers and Curtiss P-40 and Seversky P-35 fighters. The air attack damages Takao Maru and another troop ship, Oigawa Maru, and both ships are beached to prevent their sinking. Takao Maru was beached at 17°29′N 120°26′E.

On 5 March 1942 Filipino guerrillas attached the beached Takao Maru, putting her beyond repair. On 30 September she was officially declared a total loss.

== Bibliography ==
- The Joint Army-Navy Assessment Committee (1947). Japanese Naval and Merchant Shipping Losses During World War II by All Causes. Washington, DC: US Government Printing Office. p. 29. ISBN 978-1288590506.
- Lloyd's Register of Shipping. Vol. II.–Steamers and Motorships. London: Lloyd's Register of Shipping. 1928 – via Internet Archive.
- Lloyd's Register of Shipping (PDF). Vol. II.–Steamers and Motorships of 300 tons gross and over. London: Lloyd's Register of Shipping. 1934 – via Southampton City Council.
