= Japanese transport ship Oigawa Maru =

Japanese cargo ship

History

Japan
- Name: Oigawa Maru
- Owner: Toyo Kaiun K.K.
- Builder: Kawaminami Kogyo K.K., Nagasaki
- Laid down: c. 1940
- Launched: 30 January 1941
- Completed: 8 May 1941
- In service: 1941
- Fate: Requisitioned by the Imperial Japanese Army as an auxiliary transport ship, 23 September 1941

History

Imperial Japanese Army
- Name: Oigawa Maru
- Operator: Imperial Japanese Army
- Acquired: 23 September 1941
- In service: 1941-1943
- Identification: No. 408
- Fate: Sunk by PT boats off Finschhafen, 3 March 1943

General characteristics
- Tonnage: 6,494 GRT; 9,501 DWT
- Length: 445 ft 10 in (135.89 m)
- Beam: 58 ft 5 in (17.81 m)
- Height: 32 ft 2 in (9.80 m)
- Propulsion: 3500 shp steam turbine
- Speed: 15 kn (28 km/h; 17 mph) max
- Armament: Anti-aircraft guns

Oigawa Maru (大井川丸) was a 6,494 GRT transport ship of the Imperial Japanese Army during World War II.

On 10 December 1941, while unloading troops at Pandan, Philippines, she was bombed and damaged and beached to prevent sinking.

She left Rabaul, New Britain on 1 March 1943, as part of Operation 81, carrying a cargo of troops, equipment, fuel, landing craft and ammunition for Lae, New Guinea. The convoy was attacked by aircraft of the United States Army Air Forces and Royal Australian Air Force from 2 March 1943, known as the Battle of the Bismarck Sea. Oigawa Maru was bombed and damaged on 3 March, and was later sunk by motor torpedo boats PT-143 and PT-150 and sank at (06°58′S 148°16′E)

There were 78 crewmen and 1,151 troops of the 51st Division who were killed in action.
