= Japanese destroyer Matsukaze =

Two Japanese destroyers have been named Matsukaze :

- Japanese destroyer Matsukaze (1906), a Kamikaze-class destroyer launched in 1906 and scrapped in 1928
- Japanese destroyer Matsukaze (1923), a Kamikaze-class destroyer launched in 1923 and sunk in 1944
